= 20 September 2024 Beirut attack =

2024 attack in Lebanon

- Part of the September 2024 Lebanon strikes
- Location within Lebanon
- Location: Haret Hreik, Dahieh, Lebanon
- Date: 20 September 2024
- Target: Redwan Force command committee
- Deaths: 55
- Injuries: 68+
- Perpetrator: Israel

On 20 September 2024, Israel launched an air attack that leveled an apartment building in the Dahieh suburb of Beirut, Lebanon. The attack killed at least 45 people, including 16 Hezbollah militants, including commanders Ibrahim Aqil and Ahmed Wehbe. The other victims were civilians, including at least three children and seven women. At least 68 others were injured.

Israel said the strike targeted commanders of Hezbollah's elite Redwan Force command committee which was holding a meeting within the apartment building. Two months earlier, Israel had assassinated another commander, Fuad Shukr, in the then ongoing Israel–Hezbollah conflict.

== Background ==
Hezbollah and Israel have been involved in an ongoing cross-border military exchanges that has displaced entire communities in Israel and Lebanon since the start of the Gaza war in late 2023.

Earlier on 17 September 2024, just a few hours before the explosions, the Security Cabinet of Israel established a new war objective: the safe return of displaced residents to the north. Israel's domestic security agency, Shin Bet, announced it had thwarted a Hezbollah plot to assassinate a former senior defense official using an explosive device. On the same day and the following one, thousands of handheld pagers and hundreds of walkie-talkies used by Hezbollah exploded in simultaneous attacks across Lebanon and Syria. According to The New York Times, Israeli intelligence services had manufactured the devices. The incident was described by Hezbollah's officials as the organization's biggest security breach since the start of the conflict.

=== Target ===
Ibrahim Aqil was a Lebanese militant and senior official in Hezbollah. He was a member of the Jihad Council, which oversees the military and security operations of the organization. Aqil served as the head of operations and was considered by some as the de facto Chief of Staff of Hezbollah. He was also believed to be the head of the Redwan Force, an elite Hezbollah branch.

In the 1980s, he was a key figure in the Islamic Jihad Organization, a terrorist cell operated by Hezbollah and responsible for the 1983 US embassy bombing in Beirut, killing 63 people, and the attacks on the multinational force bases in Beirut that resulted in the deaths of 305 people. During the 1980s, Aqil was responsible for the kidnapping of American and German hostages. Israel conducted numerous failed assassination attempts on Aqil in the past, notably in 2000, when Israeli helicopters fired on his car but only managed to slightly injure him along with five civilians.

On 10 September 2019, the U.S. Department of State designated him as a Specially Designated Global Terrorist. On 18 April 2023, the Rewards for Justice program offered a reward of up to $7 million for information about him. According to a military and counterterrorism analyst he was involved in planning an operation similar to the October 7 attacks.

== Attack ==
On 20 September 2024, at around 15:45 EEST, an air-strike targeted a building on Jamous Street in the neighborhood of al-Qaem in the southern suburbs of Beirut, an area known as a Hezbollah stronghold. Initial reports suggested Naim Qassem, Hezbollah's second in command, was one of those who was targeted. The Lebanese National News Agency said that the air-strike was carried out in two sorties by an F-35 fighter jet.

At least 45 people including three children and seven women were killed, while 68 others were injured. Footage of the targeted site shows extensive damage to the building, with the street littered with debris and destroyed vehicles. It was also reported that the IDF confirmed a "targeted strike"; no changes in Home Front Command defensive guidelines were announced. The strike leveled the apartment building, cutting through the eight storeys and 16 apartments down to its basement. Another building also collapsed in the attack. Rescue workers immediately started digging through the rubble as 20 people remain missing from the attack.

The IDF said that at least 10 Hezbollah commanders were killed in the airstrike in Beirut alongside Ibrahim Aqil, who was holding a meeting at the basement of the building at the time of the strike. Hezbollah later confirmed the deaths of 15 of its members in the airstrike, including Aqil and Ahmed Wehbe.

The assassinations of Aqil and Wehbe marked the second and third Hezbollah commanders killed by Israel after Fuad Shukr in two months.

== Reactions ==
=== State actors ===
- Israel: Israel's military spokesperson said that the "elimination is intended to protect the citizens of Israel".
- Lebanon: Prime Minister Najib Mikati said the attack "proves again that the Israeli enemy does not value any human, legal or moral considerations".
- United States: White House National Security Council spokesperson John Kirby denied U.S. involvement in the attack and said he was "not aware of any prior notification regarding Israeli strikes on Beirut". US National Security Adviser Jake Sullivan said the assassination served justice to Aqil, stating that "any time a terrorist who has murdered Americans is brought to justice, we believe that that is a good outcome."

=== Non-state actors ===
- Hamas: Hamas denounced the attack, calling it a "crime" and saying that "Israel would pay the price" for the killings.
- Hezbollah: Hezbollah confirmed Aqil's death. In a statement, the group labelled him "a great jihadist leader", adding that he had "joined the procession of his brothers, the great martyr leaders, after a blessed life full of jihad, work, wounds, sacrifices, dangers, challenges, achievements, and victories." Hezbollah also named Ali Reda Abbas as the new leader of the Redwan Force.

== See also ==
- List of Israeli assassinations
- List of assassinations in Lebanon
- Killing of Fuad Shukr
- Assassination of Imad Mughniyeh
- Assassination of Saleh al-Arouri
