= Haytham Ali Tabatabai =

Lebanese Hezbollah commander (1968–2025)

- هيثم علي طبطبائي
- Born: 5 November 1968; Beirut, Lebanon
- Died: 23 November 2025 (aged 57); Beirut, Lebanon
- Cause of death: Assassination by airstrike
- Military career
- Allegiance: Hezbollah
- Rank: Chief of staff
- Nickname: Abu Ali Tabatabai
- Unit: Unit 3800
- Commands: Radwan Force

Haytham Ali Tabatabai (Arabic: هيثم علي طبطبائي, also known as Abu Ali Tabatabai; 5 November 1968 – 23 November 2025) was a Lebanese militant who was a senior commander in Hezbollah. According to reports, he served as a senior figure in Hezbollah Unit 3800, which has been involved in Hezbollah's activities in countries such as Syria, Yemen, and Iraq. He previously served as commander of the Radwan Force, Hezbollah's elite special forces unit.

On 26 October 2016, the U.S. Department of State designated him as a Specially Designated Global Terrorist.

Tabatabai was assassinated in an airstrike carried out by Israel on 23 November 2025.

== Biography ==
Tabatabai was born on 5 November 1968 in Beirut to an Iranian father and a Lebanese mother. He joined Hezbollah in the 1980s, according to the Israel Defense Forces, as part of its "second generation" of fighters. Hezbollah said that he had participated in military operations since the 1990s, conducting "special operations" against the IDF during its occupation of southern Lebanon in 1993 and 1996, likely referring to Israel's Operation Accountability and Operation Grapes of Wrath.

He commanded Hezbollah's operations in Nabatieh between 1996 and 2000, and was a commander of the group's October 2000 cross-border raid into Israel that resulted in the capture and later killing of three soldiers. According to Hezbollah, he managed the area of Khiam between 2000 and 2008, commanding the militant group's activities in the area during the 2006 Lebanon War. After the assassination of Imad Mughniyeh, he was appointed leader of Hezbollah's strike force, which later became the Radwan Force. He also oversaw Hezbollah's special forces in Yemen. After the outbreak of the Syrian civil war, he served as a senior commander in Hezbollah's operations against the Islamic State and Al-Nusra Front east of the Lebanese border. He was reportedly the target of a January 2015 Israeli airstrike in Quneitra Governorate that killed Jihad Mughniyah.

According to reports, Tabatabai served as a senior officer in Hezbollah's Unit 3800, a unit responsible for training operatives from Shiite militias operating across the Middle East. The unit provides support to relevant groups in Iraq and the Houthis in Yemen, and one of its primary missions is to train and assist fighters on the ground. According to reports, before the Gaza war, he was responsible for the Radwan Force's invasion portfolio.

The U.S. United States Department of State designated him on 26 October 2016 as a Specially Designated Global Terrorist and offered a reward of up to $5 million for information about him.

According to the Alma Research Center, Tabatabai replaced Ali Karaki as commander of Hezbollah's Southern Front following his assassination. He was one of two prominent survivors of the 2024 Lebanon war, together with Muhammad Haydar, who replaced Fuad Shukr. He served as the chief of Hezbollah's operations unit during the war, rising in ranks as other senior leaders were assassinated by Israel. During the 2024 Israel–Lebanon ceasefire agreement, he became Hezbollah's chief of staff and worked to restore the group's readiness for a new war. The Wall Street Journal wrote that he led Hezbollah's efforts to rebuild its forces in southern Lebanon, as well as the recruitment and training of fighters and shifting the group's military strategy to fight in smaller cells. He was Hezbollah's "second-in-command after Naim Qassem". His extensive military and operational experience contrasted with Haydar, who had a civilian background and lacked operational experience.

=== Assassination ===
On 23 November 2025, five Hezbollah members were killed and 28 others were injured in an Israeli strike on the fourth floor of an apartment building in Haret Hreik, a suburb of Beirut. Hezbollah later confirmed that Tabatabai had been assassinated in the attack.

A funeral for Tabatabai and two other Hezbollah members killed in the strike was held in Beirut on 24 November, with hundreds of mourners in attendance.

=== Aftermath ===
In a televised speech on 28 November, Naim Qassem, the secretary general of Hezbollah since October 2024, declared that the killing of Haytham Ali Tabatabai a "blatant aggression and a heinous crime" and stated that Hezbollah has "the right to respond, and we will determine the timing for that."
