= Ibrahim Aqil =

Lebanese Hezbollah commander (1962–2024)

- إبراهيم عقيل

Member of the Jihad Council

Commander of the Redwan Force
- Deputy: Wissam al-Tawil
- Preceded by: Haytham Ali Tabatabai
- Succeeded by: Ali Reda Abbas

Personal details
- Born: 24 December 1962 Bednayel, Beqaa Valley, Lebanon
- Died: 20 September 2024 (aged 61) Haret Hreik, Lebanon
- Cause of death: Assassination by airstrike
- Party: Hezbollah
- Other political affiliations: Islamic Jihad Organization (Lebanon)
- Known for: Commander-in-chief of the Redwan Force, involvement in the 1983 US embassy and multinational force bases bombings in Beirut

Military service
- Allegiance: Hezbollah
- Years of service: 1982–2024
- Unit: Redwan Force
- Battles/wars: Lebanese Civil War; South Lebanon conflict (1985–2000); 2006 Lebanon War; Syrian Civil War; Israel–Hezbollah conflict (2023–present); 2024 Lebanon War X

Ibrahim Aqil (Arabic: إبراهيم عقيل; 24 December 1962 (Note: 20 March 1961, and 1 January 1962, are also mentioned.) – 20 September 2024; also known by his aliases Al-Hajj Tahsin or Al-Hajj Abdul Khader) was a Lebanese militant leader who served as commander-in-chief of Hezbollah's special operations unit, the Radwan Force. He was a member of the Jihad Council, which oversees the military operations of the organisation. Some considered Aqil as the de facto Chief of Staff of Hezbollah.

In the 1980s, Aqil was a senior member in Hezbollah's cell responsible for the 1983 US embassy bombing and the 1983 Beirut barracks bombings. On 21 July 2015, the U.S. Department of the Treasury designated Aqil under Executive Order 13582 for his role in Hezbollah. In September 2019, the U.S. Department of State listed him as a Specially Designated Global Terrorist. The Rewards for Justice Program offered a reward of up to $7 million for information leading to his capture. He is thought to have served as the deputy to Fuad Shukr, the former commander of Hezbollah's military wing, before Shukr's death.

On 20 September 2024, Aqil was killed by an Israeli Air Force strike in Haret Hreik, Lebanon.

== Biography ==
In the 1980s, Aqil was a senior member in the Islamic Jihad Organization, a group affiliated with Hezbollah. The organization carried out the 1983 US embassy bombing in Beirut, killing 63 people, and the attacks on the multinational force bases in Beirut resulted in the deaths of 305 people. During the 1980s, Aqil was responsible for the kidnapping of American and German hostages.

On 4 February 2000, during the South Lebanon conflict, Israeli AH-64 Apache helicopters fired AGM-114 Hellfire missiles at Aqil's car in the village of Barish, where he was serving as Hezbollah's commander of the South Lebanon sector (or the western sector in South Lebanon). The first missile struck the rear of the car and threw him out. He escaped and hid behind a building. The second missile destroyed the car. After being spotted hiding, another missile was fired at him and hit the wall. Aqil was lightly injured and managed to escape the incident. Five civilians, including an infant, were also injured.

During the 2006 Lebanon War, Aqil was responsible for coordinating intelligence between Hezbollah and the Syrian Army. A month later, in September 2006, while serving as the head of Hezbollah's security and intelligence services, the "Intelligence Online" reported that Aqil was one of three Hezbollah operatives, along with Hassan Nasrallah and Mustafa Badreddine, who visited North Korea for several months during the 1980s and early 1990s for training.

On 21 July 2015, the U.S. Department of the Treasury designated Aqil as closely tied to Hezbollah's leadership and acting on its behalf, along with other senior figures in the organization—Mustafa Badreddine, Fuad Shukr, and Abd al-Nur Shalaan. He was identified as playing a key role in Hezbollah's military campaign in Syria by assisting the organization's fighters and Syrian government forces against Syrian rebels during the Syrian Civil War. Aqil had also been sought through several 'Red Notices' by Interpol, documenting his long history with the organization, including involvement in the kidnapping and holding of two German citizens in the late 1980s and the 1985–86 Paris attacks.

In May 2016, following the assassination of Mustafa Badreddine, Aqil was one of two candidates (alongside Fuad Shukr) considered to succeed him as Hezbollah's defence minister (though others identified Fuad Shukr in this role).

On 10 September 2019, the U.S. Department of State designated him as a Specially Designated Global Terrorist. On 18 April 2023, the Rewards for Justice program offered a reward of up to $7 million for information about him.

Before his death, Aqil served as the head of Hezbollah's operations and was responsible for the Radwan Force, among other things, during the Hezbollah–Israel conflict that began following Hezbollah's attacks on Israel the day after Hamas' October 7 attacks. He also led Hezbollah's tunnel project in Lebanon. He was reportedly injured during the 2024 Lebanon pager explosions and released from the hospital on the day of his assassination. In the event of an Israeli invasion of Lebanon, Aqil's unit had planned to conduct a counter-operation, similar to the October 7 attacks, in northern Israel. The unit would also be involved in defending southern Lebanon from an Israeli invasion.

== Assassination ==
On 20 September 2024, Israeli F-35 fighter jets fired four missiles at a residential building in the Dahieh suburb of Beirut, targeting Aqil, who was at a meeting two storeys underground. The airstrike killed at least 45 people including senior Hezbollah commander Ahmed Mahmoud Wahabi, 14 other high-ranking Hezbollah militants, three children, and seven women, injured another 68, and caused two buildings to collapse. The Israeli military confirmed the attack targeted Aqil, and later confirmed Aqil's death. Saudi reports were the first to report his death. IDF Spokesman Daniel Hagari said that Aqil and other top leadership of the elite Radwan Force were gathered underground when they were targeted and killed in the Israeli airstrike. He also claimed that at least 10 Hezbollah commanders were killed in the airstrike in Beirut.

Several hours later, Hezbollah confirmed Aqil's death. In a statement published by the group, he was described as "a great jihadist leader". The statement also said he had "joined the procession of his brothers, the great martyr leaders, after a blessed life full of jihad".

U.S. National Security Adviser Jake Sullivan said the assassination served justice to Aqil, stating: "any time a terrorist who has murdered Americans is brought to justice, we believe that that is a good outcome."
