= 2024 Basta airstrikes =

2024 Basta airstrike
- Part of the 2024 Israeli invasion of Lebanon
- Location within Lebanon
- Location: Basta, Beirut, Lebanon
- Date: 23 November 2024
- Target: Senior Hezbollah members
- Attack type: Airstrikes, massacre
- Weapon: Bunker buster
- Deaths: 29+
- Injuries: 67+
- Perpetrator: Israel Defense Forces

On 23 November 2024, the Israel Defense Forces (IDF) carried out an airstrike in Basta in central Beirut, Lebanon, as part of the 2024 Israeli invasion of Lebanon. The airstrike in the densely populated neighborhood killed at least 29 people and injured another 67 with 30 others missing.

== Background ==
The day after Hamas's 7 October 2023 attacks on Israel, Hezbollah fired rockets at the Shebaa Farms, claiming solidarity with the "Palestinian people". This quickly escalated into regular cross-border military exchanges with Israel, impacting northern Israel, southern Lebanon and the Golan Heights. Israel launched a major offensive against Hezbollah in September 2024, killing top commanders and targeted command centers and weapons storage facilities with the aim to have displaced people return to northern Israel.

== Attack ==
The strikes occurred early in the morning, around 4 AM, and without warning where at least four bombs hit an eight-storey apartment building. The building was leveled, and seven smaller residential buildings in the vicinity were also destroyed, creating deep craters in the ground where the structures once stood. Rescue workers began immediately working on the scene and is said that 30 people are still missing and many bodies of victims needed DNA testing to be identified.

Similarly to the assassination of Hassan Nasrallah, the airstrikes reportedly used bunker buster munitions, which are designed to penetrate deep into the ground before detonating.

== Target ==
The exact target of the strikes was unclear, with Israeli media suggesting that high-level Hezbollah officials might have been the intended targets. However, Hezbollah MP, Amine Sherri, denied that any members of the group were present in the building at the time of the attack. According to the Israeli public broadcaster Kan, the attack was an attempt to kill Mohammed Haydar while other reports suggested Naim Qassem and Talal Hamiyeh in which their fates remain unclear.
