= Disappearance of Ahmad Shukr =

2025 event in Lebanon

On 19 December 2025, Ahmad Ali Shukr (Arabic: أحمد علي شكر), a Lebanese former General Security officer, disappeared while en route to a meeting in the Beqaa Valley. His disappearance received wide media coverage, as an official investigations began as he was linked to disappearance of Israeli Air Force navigator Ron Arad in 1986.

== Background ==
Shukr is a retired major of Lebanon’s General Security service. He is from Al-Nabi Shayth in the Beqaa Valley region of Lebanon. He disappeared while was on his way to a real estate meeting. His extended family includes Fuad Shukr, who was a senior member of Hezbollah, and fighters in the Lebanese Civil War and in conflicts with Israel in the 1980s. He was linked to the disappearance of Ron Arad, an Israeli navigator whose aircraft was downed in southern Lebanon in 1986 and who has been missing ever since.

== Disappearance ==
Shukr was announced missing in mid December, while he was on his way to a real estate meeting in Zahlé in the Beqaa Valley. Contact with him was lost during the afternoon of December 19. Lebanese army sources initially described him as missing, while local officials called the incident a kidnapping.

== Investigations and allegations ==
Lebanon's Internal Security Forces are investigating the disappearance. Early steps included checking security camera footage and phone records after Shukr was reported missing. Some Lebanese sources, quoted by regional media, say Shukr may have been tricked into a secret operation involving two foreigners who came to Lebanon shortly before he disappeared. Investigators reportedly focused on an area near Zahle, where his trail ended.

Unnamed sources have claimed Shukr may have been kidnapped by Israeli intelligence because he was believed to have information about the fate of Ron Arad. Israel has not confirmed any involvement, and no official conclusion has been announced. Later investigations have revealed he was in contact with two unknown individuals, holding Swedish citizenship and Lebanese phones. One of them left the country on the same day.

== See also ==
- Killing of Fuad Shukr
- Disappearance of Ron Arad
