= Muhammad Haydar =

Lebanese Hezbollah politician

Mohammad Haidar
- مُحَمَّد حيدر
- Born: 25 November 1959 (age 66)
- Other name: Abu Ali
- Occupations: Politician; Security official
- Political party: Hezbollah

Mohammad Haidar (Arabic: مُحَمَّد حيدر, romanized: Muḥammad Ḥaydar, born 25 November 1959), also known as Abu Ali Haidar, is a Lebanese politician and senior leader in Hezbollah’s Jihad Council, and Unit 8030 which oversees the organization’s activities, including recruitment, training, and security.

In September 2019, the U.S. Department of the Treasury designated Haidar as a Specially Designated Global Terrorist, imposing sanctions that freeze his assets under U.S. jurisdiction and prohibit U.S. persons from engaging in transactions with him.

== Biography ==
Mohammad Haidar was elected to the Lebanese Parliament in 2004, representing Hezbollah, and served as a member until 2009. During this time, he was also a senior figure within Hezbollah’s Jihad Council, overseeing military operations and appointing leaders to various units. Following the assassination of Hezbollah’s international operations chief, Imad Mughniyah, in 2008, Haidar emerged as one of the organization's top military leaders. His influence further solidified after the death of another key figure, Mustafa Badreddine, in 2016.

On September 10, 2019, the U.S. Department of the Treasury designated Haidar as a Specially Designated Global Terrorist under Executive Order 13224. This designation froze his assets under U.S. jurisdiction and prohibited U.S. persons from engaging in transactions with him. The U.S. government described Haidar as a pivotal figure in Hezbollah’s military operations, emphasizing his role in maintaining the group’s global networks. This move was part of a broader strategy to weaken Hezbollah by targeting its leadership and financial infrastructure.

== Assassination attempt ==
On August 25, 2019, Lebanese media reported that two Israeli drones crashed in Beirut's southern Dahieh neighborhood under Hezbollah's control. The Lebanese newspaper Nidaa Al-Watan had previously reported that Israel was planning to assassinate Muhammad Haydar.

On November 23, 2024, an Israeli airstrike targeted a building in the Basta area of Beirut's Central District. The attack resulted in at least 29 fatalities and left 67 others injured, including women. He was reportedly not present in the building.
