= Killing of Fuad Shukr =

2024 Israeli drone attack in Dahieh, Beirut

2024 Haret Hreik airstrike
- Part of the Israel–Hezbollah conflict (2023–present) and Middle Eastern crisis (2023–present)
- Type: Airstrike
- Location: Beirut, Lebanon; 33.85444°N 35.51167°E
- Target: Fuad Shukr
- Date: 30 July 2024; 7:40 (UTC+03:00)
- Executed by: Israeli Air Force
- Casualties: 7 killed 80 injured
- Location within Lebanon

On 30 July 2024, Israel conducted an airstrike on an apartment building in Haret Hreik in the suburbs of the Lebanese capital of Beirut, killing Hezbollah commander Fuad Shukr, Iranian military adviser Milad Bedi, as well as five Lebanese civilians, including two children, and wounding 80 others.

The attack targeted Shukr, who was accused by the Israeli military of being involved in the rocket attack that occurred three days earlier in Majdal Shams in the Israeli-occupied Golan Heights, which killed 12 Syrian Druze children and teenagers. The Lebanese state National News Agency reported that the attack was carried out by a drone firing three missiles at an apartment building, which partially collapsed.

== Background ==
Since the 2023 Hamas-led attack on Israel, Hezbollah and Israel have been involved in cross-border military exchanges that have displaced entire communities in Israel and Lebanon, with significant damage to buildings and land along the border. As of 5 July 2024, Israel reports having killed approximately 366 Hezbollah operatives with over 100 Lebanese civilians confirmed killed. According to the UN, over 90,000 people in Lebanon have been forced to flee their homes, while in Israel, 60,000 civilians have evacuated. Israel and Hezbollah have maintained their attacks at a level that causes significant harm without escalating into a full-scale war. From 7 October 2023 to 21 June 2024, Israel attacked Lebanon 6,124 times. Hezbollah and other Lebanese forces attacked Israel 1,258 times.

On 27 July 2024, the Majdal Shams attack took place when a football pitch was hit by a rocket in the Druze town of Majdal Shams in the Golan Heights, (Note: Israel captured the territory from Syria during the 1967 Six-Day War and later annexed it. Most of the international community consider the territory part of Syria occupied by Israel, though this is disputed by Israel and the United States.) resulting in the deaths of 12 Syrian Druze children and young people. This incident became the deadliest along Israel's border with Lebanon since the onset of the 2023 conflict, provoking widespread outrage and shock. Israel and the United States have attributed the attack to Hezbollah, noting that the rocket was an Iranian-made Falaq-1 with a warhead containing over 50 kilograms of explosives. Hezbollah has, however, firmly denied any involvement. In response, Israel vowed to retaliate while explicitly aiming to specifically target Hezbollah and avoid escalating the conflict into a full-scale regional war. Before the attack, several international airliners ceased their flights to Beirut–Rafic Hariri International Airport. Earlier on 30 July, a Hezbollah rocket attack on Kibbutz HaGoshrim in the Upper Galilee killed an Israeli civilian.

=== Target ===
Shukr in 2014

Fuad Shukr, the target of the attack, was listed as a Specially Designated Global Terrorist by the U.S., and served as a senior advisor on military affairs to Hassan Nasrallah, secretary-general of Hezbollah. He also served in Hezbollah's highest military body, the Jihad Council. Shukr was involved in the 23 October 1983 bombing of the U.S. Marine Corps Barracks in Beirut which killed 241 U.S. military personnel and wounded 128 others. According to Israeli intelligence, he was also a leading figure in facilitating the transfer of Iranian guidance systems for Hezbollah's long-range missiles. In 2017, the U.S. Treasury offered $5 million for information on Shukr. After the barracks bombing he mostly lived in an apartment in Haret Hreik rarely appearing in public.

== Attack ==
Witnesses reported a loud explosion at around 7:40 PM (local time) in the Dahieh district of Beirut, an area with significant Hezbollah presence. The attack targeted Hezbollah commander Fuad Shukr, near Hezbollah's Shura Council. According to a WSJ report, a Hezbollah official said Shukr received a call telling him to go to his apartment five floors up. Shukr had his office on the second floor, and lived on the seventh floor of the same building. The call likely came from someone who had breached Hezbollah's internal communications network, and saw the higher floor as an easier target for an air attack. Hezbollah denied this and said The Wall Street Journal report was "fabricated" and "full of lies".

Lebanese state news agency National News Agency (NNA) reported that the attack was executed using a drone that launched three missiles, although the IDF's statement on the attack did not specify the exact method of the strike. The missiles struck an apartment building prompting half of it to collapse and caused minor damage to a hospital next to the building. Immediately following the attacks, a significant panic occurred among the citizens, when many of them tried to flee home to safety and caused a lot of congestion. In addition, groups of demonstrators began to fill the streets near the site of the attack, while shouting slogans and slogans in favor of Hezbollah. Reporters and journalists faced hostility while covering the incident, namely Al Jazeera and MTV, who were attacked by Hezbollah supporters that were at the site of the raid in Haret Hreik and prevented them from covering the event.

Early reports indicated that Fuad Shukr survived the airstrike. However, Saudi-owned news outlets have cited sources reporting that Shukr was killed in the attack. Israel later said Fuad Shukr was killed, while Hezbollah did not yet confirm his death and stated that it was still assessing the damage from the strike. The Lebanese Health Ministry said that two women, including Shukr's wife, and two children were killed and an additional 80 were injured. The following day, Lebanese security sources announced that his body was found under the rubble, confirming his death, and Hezbollah formally announced it hours later. Milad Bidi, an Iranian military adviser in Lebanon, was also killed raising the death toll to seven.

== Reactions ==
Lebanese Prime Minister Najib Mikati condemned the attack, calling it a “series of aggressive operations killing civilians in clear and explicit violation of international law.” Information Minister Ziad Makary stated that Lebanon anticipates a Hezbollah retaliation for the Israeli strike and that the government will pursue diplomatic efforts to de-escalate tensions.

Israeli Minister of Defense Yoav Gallant posted a public statement to his X (Twitter) account stating "Hezbollah crossed the red line." shortly after the attack took place.

Hezbollah MP Ali Ammar stated: "This enemy demands war and we are up for it, God willing, we are up for it." Thirty minutes later, it was reported that Israeli Defense Minister Gallant told troops that "we don't want war, but we're preparing for all possibilities."

=== International ===
United States Vice President Kamala Harris stated that Israel "has a right to defend itself against the terrorist organisation, which is exactly what Hezbollah is" while on a campaign trip to Atlanta, Georgia.

The Foreign Ministry of Iran called the attack "vicious" and expressed admiration for the resistance of the Lebanese people against "the aggression of the Israeli apartheid regime" in support of Palestinians.

The Russian Foreign Ministry called the attack a "gross violation of international law".

== Hezbollah revenge attack ==
On August 25, 2024, in the early morning, Hezbollah launched an extensive rocket attack from Lebanon toward Israel in response to the killing of Shukr. The attack coincided with Arba'in, a significant observance for Shia Muslims, which Hezbollah cited as part of their motivation. The group later announced that a total of 320 rockets had been fired at Israel during this phase. In response, Israel conducted preemptive airstrikes, targeting thousands of Hezbollah rocket launchers programmed to fire towards Tel Aviv at 5 a.m., deploying hundreds of jet fighters.

U.S. President Joe Biden closely monitored the situation, with continuous communications between U.S. and Israeli officials. Ben Gurion Airport temporarily halted operations. Israeli Defense Minister Yoav Gallant declared a 48-hour emergency situation and briefed U.S. Secretary of Defense Lloyd Austin on the developments. Israeli Prime Minister Benjamin Netanyahu convened a security cabinet meeting to address the situation, and emergency measures were implemented across northern Israel, including the opening of shelters and restrictions on public movement.

== See also ==
- Assassination of Ismail Haniyeh
- Assassination of Saleh al-Arouri
- 1983 Beirut barracks bombings
- 2024 Majdal Shams attack
- Battle of Tyre (2024)
- Disappearance of Ahmad Shukr
