= Ali Karaki =

Lebanese Hezbollah militant (1967–2024)

- Born: 1962; Ain Bouswar, Nabatieh, Lebanon
- Died: 27 September 2024 (aged 61–62) Dahieh, Lebanon
- Cause of death: Assassination by airstrike
- Allegiance: Hezbollah
- Service years: 1980s–2024
- Conflicts: Lebanese Civil War; South Lebanon conflict (1985–2000); 2006 Lebanon War; Israel–Hezbollah conflict; 2024 Lebanon War X

Ali Karaki (Arabic: علي كركي; 1962 – 27 September 2024) was a Lebanese militant who was a member of Hezbollah's Jihad Council. He served as the commander of the Southern Front of Hezbollah.

Karaki was killed alongside the group's leader, Hassan Nasrallah, during a targeted assassination that took place while a leadership meeting was being held at their headquarters in Dahieh.

== Life and career ==
Karaki was born in 1962 in Ain Bouswar, Nabatieh Governorate, located in southern Lebanon. After completing his university studies, he joined Hezbollah during the Lebanese Civil War. Over time, he rose through the ranks and took part in the 2006 Lebanon War. Karaki later became a member of Hezbollah's Jihad Council, which is Hezbollah's supreme command and served as the commander of the southern front. Additionally, he held Guinean citizenship.

Karaki had been involved in various terrorist activities, particularly in southern Lebanon, and had been linked to Hezbollah's strategic operations against Israel. In September 2019, he was sanctioned by the US State Department, which described him as a significant figure within Hezbollah's military leadership.

In February 2024, Israel attempted to assassinate him in a car bombing in Nabatieh, but he was not in the target vehicle. After the assassination of Ibrahim Aqil, he was appointed to serve as one of his two successors in leading the campaign against Israel on the northern front of the Gaza war. He was considered the number 3 commander in Hezbollah after Aqil's assassination.

=== Death ===
On 23 September 2024, it was reported that Karaki was targeted in an airstrike by Israel while he was in an apartment in the Bir al-Abed area of the Dahieh district in Beirut. He was injured but survived. His survival was attributed to the IDF using an insufficient quantity of explosives.

On 27 September 2024, he was killed alongside Hezbollah's leader Hassan Nasrallah in another airstrike in Beirut. Hezbollah announced Nasrallah's death the next day. On 29 September, Hezbollah confirmed Karaki's death. Reports indicated that his successor was Hajj Yusuf Ismail Hashem. Hashem was assassinated on April 1, 2026 during the 2026 Lebanon war.
