= Jihad Council =

Leadership body within Hezbollah

- Leader: Naim Qassem
- Dates active: 1995-presient
- Country: Lebanon
- Allegiance: Axis of Resistance
- Groups: Bader unit; Aziz unit; Haider unit; Radwan unit; Al-Kayim unit; Unit 133; Unit 3800; Unit 127; Unit 121
- Ideology: Shia Islamism; Lebanese nationalism
- Political position: Right-wing
- Part of: Hezbollah

The Jihad Council of Hezbollah is a military command structure and armed wing responsible for directing and coordinating the groups' military and security activities. It also exercises considerable influence over the organization's various civilian branches and maintains ties with external partners, including Iran, a key patron of the group.

Established in 1995, the council operates under the direct supervision of Hezbollah's Secretary-General and is subordinate to Hezbollah's Shura Council.

The Jihad Council is involved in activities against Israel, including Unit 133, which conducts operations within Israeli territory and the Palestinian Authority, recruiting Palestinians living in Lebanon for military missions and gathering intelligence across Eastern Europe to carry out activities against Israeli targets. The council's involvement underscores its strategic role in Hezbollah's activities against Israel and in the broader regional context.

== History ==
The Hezbollah Jihad Council was established at the conclusion of Hezbollah's fourth conclave in July 1995. This was a strategic decision to consolidate the oversight of Hezbollah's military and security activities. Early members of the council included influential figures such as Imad Mughniyeh, who served as head of the council until he was killed by a car bomb in February 2008, and Mustafa Badreddine, who succeeded him until he died in an explosion in May 2016. The leadership of the council remains unclear.

== Structure and responsibilities ==
The Jihad Council is composed of senior Hezbollah military figures and is responsible for supervising, coordinating, and determining new activities – both ongoing and specialized actions. The Council is also responsible for the actions of all civilian bodies under Hezbollah, particularly those related to military aspects or those that potentially intersect with them. Positioned as a linchpin within Hezbollah's organizational framework, the council operates under the direct tutelage of the leader of Hezbollah, and operates as a subordinate entity to the Shura Council, the primary decision-making body within the organization.

== Key members ==
Members of the Jihad Council include:

- Mohammed Haydar, former member of Parliament
- Talal Hamiyah, commander of unit 910 – Hezbollah's "External Security Organization" (ESO – Hezbollah's foreign operations arm)
- Khuder Yusef Nader, also known as Ezzaddine, commander of unit 900 – Hezbollah's counterterrorism, counterintelligence and internal security unit
- Wafiq Safa, head of Hezbollah's Liaison and Coordination Unit

Past members:

- Suhail Hussein Husseini, commander of Hezbollah's HQ & logistics (killed on 7 October 2024, by an Israeli strike)
- Hashem Safieddine, the head of the Executive Council, the organization's military chief (killed on 3 October 2024, by an Israeli strike)
- Nabil Qaouk, deputy head of the Executive Council and the commander of Hezbollah's "preventive security unit" (killed on 28 September 2024, by an Israeli strike)
- Ali Karaki (killed on 27 September 2024, by an Israeli strike)
- Ibrahim Aqil, the head of the organization's security unit, and a representative from the Shura Council (killed on 20 September 2024, by an Israeli strike)
- Fuad Shukr (killed on 30 July 2024, by an Israeli strike)

The presence of Iranian representatives at the council's gatherings signifies the direct coordination between the Jihad Council and the Iranian regime, indicating the depth of the relationship and collaboration between the two entities.

== Specialized units and operations ==
The specialized units operating under Hezbollah's Jihad Council, including "Bader," "Aziz," "Haider," "Radwan," "al-Kayim," Unit 133, and Unit 3800, are integral components of the organization's military wing. These units are designed to fulfill precise roles within Hezbollah's strategy, often oriented around asymmetric warfare tactics.

=== Bader unit ===
The Bader unit is reported to specialize in advanced guerilla warfare tactics. It is reputed for its rigorous training and preparation for high-intensity conflict scenarios. Bader operatives are believed to be trained in the use of sophisticated weaponry and are prepared for direct engagements.

=== Aziz unit ===
Named after a prominent figure in Hezbollah lore, the Aziz unit is often associated with special operations beyond Lebanon's borders. It is purported to carry out covert activities, including reconnaissance and intelligence collection in areas deemed of strategic importance to Hezbollah. One of the unit's commanders, Hassan Muhammad al-Hajj, was killed in Syria in October 2015.

=== Haider unit ===
The Haider unit is reportedly a quick-reaction force capable of mobilizing rapidly in response to security incidents or battlefield developments. Its mandate includes counter-operations and rapid deployment to reinforce Hezbollah's positions or repel enemy advances. This unit operates around the city of Baalbeck and in northern Hermel.

=== Radwan unit ===
Possibly the most well-known of Hezbollah's special units, the Radwan Force is believed to be an elite force trained explicitly for cross-border raids and operations requiring precise execution. The Radwan unit has been attributed with the capability to infiltrate enemy territories for sabotage or capture operations. On September 20 2024, the Commander of the Radwan Unit at the time, Ibrahim Aqil, was eliminated by the Israeli Defence Forces alongside a dozen senior operatives of the group, in a strike where they were convening in the basement of a civilian building in south Beirut. The IDF has alleged that the unit was planning an invasion of northern Israel in the same vein of the 2023 Hamas-led attack on Israel.

=== Al-Kayim unit ===
The al-Kayim unit is often linked to logistics and support, providing essential services such as transportation, supply distribution, and the maintenance of communication lines during military engagements.

=== Unit 133 ===
Unit 133 is purportedly designated for operations abroad, focusing on international missions that may include planning and executing attacks, establishing sleeper cells, and gathering intelligence in various countries.

=== Unit 3800 ===
Unit 3800 is allegedly responsible for coordinating and supporting pro-Iranian militias across the Middle East, particularly in conflict zones like Syria and Iraq. This unit is thought to be involved in the training and equipping of allied forces, sharing Hezbollah's expertise in guerilla warfare tactics and enhancing the capabilities of these proxies.

=== Unit 127 ===
Unit 127 is Hezbollah's "aerial unit" (وحدة الجوية), responsible for the development, production, and operational deployment of unmanned aerial vehicles (UAVs). The unit has emerged as a central player in Hezbollah’s military strategy, particularly in its ongoing conflict with Israel.

=== Unit 121 ===
Unit 121 acts as Hezbollah's covert assassination team, operating under the direct authority of the group's Secretary-General.
