= Al-Otaiba ambush =

Part of the Syrian civil war

Coordinates: 33.8000°N 37.0167°E

- Part of the Syrian civil war
Date	26 February 2014
Location	Ghouta, Syria
Result	Hezbollah victory

Belligerents
Al-Nusra Front (alleged)	Hezbollah; Supported by: Syrian Arab Army

Commanders and leaders
Unknown commander †	Mustafa Badreddine; Ra'fat Salman Abu Rahhal; Rawad Zaidan (Note: Claimed by the Syrian transitional government.); Ahmed Talal Raslan

Strength
100–200+	Unknown

Casualties and losses
US Army: 100+ killed Syrian Observatory for Human Rights: 152 killed, 7 captured Syrian government:175–192 killed, 58 wounded/captured	None (claim)
- 150 civilians killed

The Al-Otaiba ambush, also referred to as the Al-Otaiba ambush massacre was a military operation conducted on 26 February 2014 by Hezbollah against alleged al-Nusra militants at Al-Otaiba, a village in East Ghouta, near Damascus, Syria. In the ambush, a long, single-file column of alleged al-Nusra Front fighters were obliterated by multiple, simultaneous IED blasts. They were then targeted by Hezbollah with additional secondary explosions and small-arms fire. Hezbollah received minor support from the Ba'athist-led Syrian Arab Army in the ambush.

Various reports suggest that over 100 al-Nusra fighters were killed, which makes the ambush a major victory for Hezbollah. According to analysts, the operation may have tightened the government's grip on east Damascus. After the fall of the Ba'athist-led regime, later investigations into the ambush site by the Syrian transitional government would discover the remains of 100 civilians; later on, the Syrian transitional government would officially state that 150 civilians were killed.

On November 20 2026, Rawad Zaidan, claimed by the Syrian transitional government as the 'mastermind' behind the ambush, alongside Ahmed Raslan, also claimed to have been involved in the ambush, was arrested.

== Ambush ==
In early 2014, Hezbollah intelligence allegedly intercepted an al-Nusra Front plan to move a large group of men at night from the besieged East Ghouta to more defensible positions in the Qalamoun Mountains northeast of Damascus. Their path would take them along a well-worn infiltration route through the rural village of Al-Otaiba. The US Army and most sources report that the operation was planned by Hezbollah. The route and approximate time of the Nusra convoy was determined in advance, and IEDs were planted and concealed in advance of the travelers’ arrival.

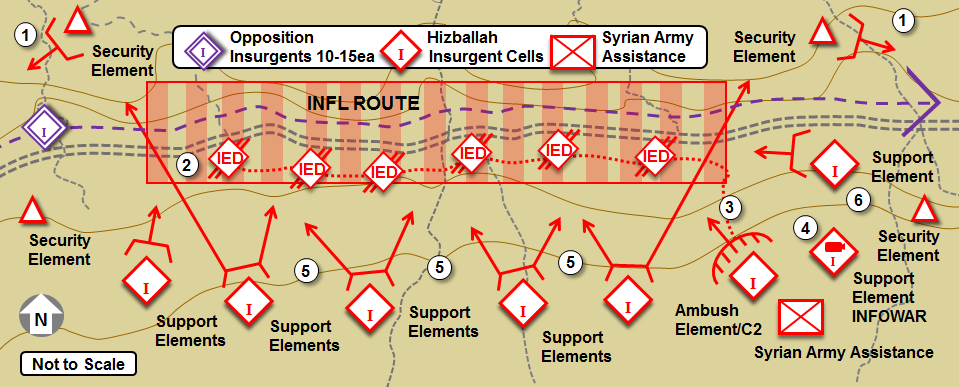

1. Hezbollah reconnaissance and surveillance confirm recurring infiltration route of rebel insurgents.
2. IEDs/military-grade munitions emplaced in kill zone for simultaneous command detonation.
3. A Hezbollah commander on standby to initiate ambush with command detonation and automatic weapons fires.
4. Support element prepares to videotape ambush for social media exploitation.
5. Support elements occupy hidden positions with overlapping sectors of fire into kill zone.
6. Hezbollah support element with heavy machineguns prepared to engage along the entire length of the kill zone.

At approximately midnight, the alleged insurgents from al-Nusra front began moving. The alleged Nusra fighters, who were traveling by convoy, exited their vehicles and for unclear reasons proceeded on foot. Around 2:45 A.M., the alleged fighters arrived at the ambush site in Al-Utayba.

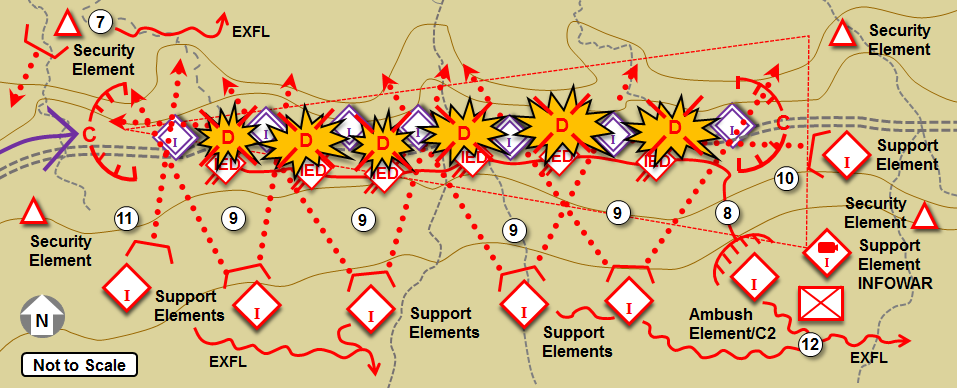
The ambush

7. Hezbollah security element alerts leader of 175-200 dismounted rebel insurgents approaching on trail.
8. Hezbollah leader command detonates munitions once a majority of alleged Al-Nusra forces are within the kill zone.
9. Hezbollah support elements isolate enemy with automatic fires in designated sectors of fire of kill zone.
10. Ambush and support elements contain and destroy rebels in kill zone.
11. Support elements clear and exploit the kill zone after the ambush and report to cell leader.
12. Hezbollah media cell videotapes ambush success. Rebel insurgent cells disperse.

They were then attacked by Hezbollah, who detonated a field of IEDs and then targeted the survivors with machine guns in a successful battle of annihilation.

== Aftermath ==
The Salafist rebel group Jaish al-Islam denied reports that it had members in the ambush and said it suffered no casualties. Syrian state media claimed most of the dead were Saudi, Qatari, and Chechen nationals.

=== Media ===
The ambush was carefully filmed by Hezbollah cells and published by Al-Manar for propaganda purposes. Their video of the ambush shows that the attack had a primary wave of IED detonations, causing the brunt of the casualties, and then a smaller secondary wave.

Hezbollah's Al-Manar TV station reported that the fighters were trying to break out of Eastern Ghouta to join battles in either the town of Deraa or the Qalamoun mountains. Jaish al-Islam claimed the dead were civilians, trying to escape a siege.

=== Fall of the Ba'athist-led regime ===
After the fall of the Ba'athist-led regime in 2024, in 2025, according to the Syrian News Channel, later investigations into the ambush site by the Syrian transitional government would reveal that the remains of at least 100 of the total casualties in the ambush had belonged to civilians; 150 civilians would officially be stated to have been killed during the ambush.

On November 20 2026, Rawad Zaidan, claimed to be the 'mastermind' and 'commander' behind the ambush by the Syrian Ministry of Interior, was arrested. On the same day, Ahmed Raslan, also claimed to have been involved in the ambush, was also arrested.
