= Talal Hamiyah =

Lebanese terrorist leader

- طلال حمية
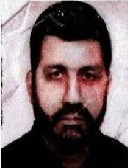
- Born: Talal Hussein Hamiyah; Between 1952 and 1960 (age between 65 and 74); Brital, Baalbek-Hermel Governorate, Lebanon
- Military career
- Allegiance: Hezbollah
- Rank: Chief of Staff, External Security Organization (Unit 910)
- Nickname: Abu Jaafar
- Known for: Senior Hezbollah commander, designated a Specially Designated Global Terrorist by the US Treasury Department
- Conflicts: AMIA bombing; Khobar Towers bombing; 2006 Lebanon War

Talal Hamiyah (Arabic: طلال حمية, romanized: Ṭalāl Ḥamiyah; born between 1952 and 1960) is a Lebanese militant leader. A senior military commander in Hezbollah since its founding in the early 1980s. He heads Hezbollah's External Security Organization (ESO), also known as Unit 910, which is responsible for planning and executing terrorist activities outside Lebanon. He is associated with terror attacks such as the 1994 AMIA bombing and 1996 Khobar Towers bombing. In 2017, the U.S. added Hamiyah to its Rewards for Justice Program, offering $7 million for information leading to his arrest. Since 2008 he is a senior member of the Jihad Council, and the leader of Unit 121 since 2016.

== Biography ==
Talal Hussein Hamiyah was born between 1952 and 1960 in Brital in the Baalbek-Hermel Governorate in the Bekka Valley. He joined Hezbollah in the early 1980s, shortly after the arrival of Iranian trainers to the region. After the assassination of Abbas al-Musawi, Hamiyah became a close associate of Imad Mughniyeh. He became known to intelligence officials after he was caught on an intercepted communication celebrating the AMIA bombing, in which 85 people were killed, in Argentina. For many years he was Mugniyeh's deputy, directing the 1996 Khobar Towers bombing, in which 19 U.S. soldiers were killed, and attacks against the IDF during the Second Lebanon War.

He is a veteran figure in Hezbollah's foreign military operations, working alongside Hezbollah military commanders Mustafa Badreddine and Imad Mughniyeh and IRGC commander Mohsen Rezaee. Following Mughniyeh's death in 2008, Hamiyah replaced him as Hezbollah's Chief of Staff, and he joined the Jihad Council alongside his responsibilities leading Hezbollah's foreign operations arm the External Security Organization (Unit 910).

After Badreddine was indicted by the Special Tribunal for Lebanon for charges related to the assassination of Rafic Hariri in 2011, Hamiyah reportedly assumed command of Hezbollah's military operations. Following Badreddine's death in 2016, Hamiyah was considered a "rising star" in Hezbollah and someone likely to promoted to a more senior role in the organization. His photo was publicly revealed for the first time in 2016.

=== Designations ===
Hamiyah was designated a Specially Designated Global Terrorist by the US Treasury Department on 13 September 2012 due to his alleged role as top military commander. He was designated alongside Badreddine. The basis for their designation was E.O. 13224 for providing support to Hezbollah's terrorist activities in the Middle East and around the world.

The U.S. State Department added him to its Rewards for Justice Program (RFJ) on October 10, 2017, offering $7 million for information leading to his arrest. Hamiyah was added to the RFJ program alongside Hezbollah senior military commander Fuad Shukr as part of the first rewards for Hezbollah figures in a decade.
