= Ron Arad (navigator) =

Israeli Air Force officer missing in action since 1986

- רון ארד
- Picture of Ron Arad taken by Amal militants.
- Born: 5 May 1958; Hod HaSharon, Israel
- Disappeared: 16 October 1986 (aged 28); Near Maghdouche, Southern Lebanon
- Spouse: Tami Arad
- Children: 1
- Military career
- Allegiance: Israel
- Branch: Israeli Air Force
- Service years: 1978–86
- Rank: Lieutenant Colonel; Captain at the time of his capture
- Status: Missing for 40 years, 1 month and 4 days

Ron Arad (Hebrew: רוֹן אָרָד; born 5 May 1958), was an Israeli Air Force weapon systems officer (WSO) who has officially been classified as missing in action since October 1986. Arad was lost on a mission over Lebanon and is believed to have been captured by the militant group Amal and later handed over to Hezbollah.

== Personal life ==
Arad was born on 5 May 1958 in Hod HaSharon, Israel. He studied in the Boarding Command School in Tel Aviv. Arad began his military service in the Israel Defense Forces in 1978 and graduated from the IAF flight course in 1979 as a combat navigator.

In October 1985, Arad began studying chemical engineering at the Technion in Haifa. Arad was married to Tami and is father to a daughter, Yuval.

== Capture ==
On 16 October 1986, Arad and pilot Yishai Aviram were on a mission to attack PLO targets around Maghdouche in Southern Lebanon. A bomb dropped by their F-4E Phantom II apparently exploded prematurely, causing damage to the aircraft and forcing both crewmen to eject. Aviram was located by an Israeli Bell AH-1E Cobra a few hours later, and escaped by clinging to one of its landing skids as it flew away while under heavy enemy fire, but Arad was captured by the Lebanese Amal.

== Captivity ==
Arad was taken to Beirut where he was held by then-head of security of Amal, Mustafa Dirani. Amal head Nabih Berri announced that he was holding Arad, and proposed an exchange for Shiite and Lebanese prisoners held in Israel.

In 1987, three letters in Arad's handwriting and two photos of a bearded Arad were received, proving Arad was alive. The Israeli government negotiated for his release, but talks failed in 1988. After this time, credible information about Arad has been hard to obtain, though unsubstantiated claims of new information are made regularly.

== Efforts to determine Arad's whereabouts and repatriate him ==
=== 1980s and 1990s ===
To gain further insight on his whereabouts, Israeli commandos captured Hezbollah member Abdel Karim Obeid in 1989, and Mustafa Dirani in 1994. Both men were taken from their homes. The Obeid kidnapping led to the adoption of United Nations Security Council Resolution 638, which condemned all hostage takings by all sides. The Israeli government claimed it was holding the men in order to find out information about Arad. During his interrogation by IDF officers, Dirani reportedly disclosed that on 4 May 1988, Arad was turned over first to a Hezbollah unit and then to Iranian Revolutionary Guards who were in Lebanon at the time aiding Hezbollah guerrillas, after which he may have been taken to Iran. But neither Iran nor any guerrilla group ever offered any useful information about Arad's fate. Karim-Obeid and Dirani were released in 2004 as part of a prisoner swap. No information on Arad's fate was released after the swap.

In the early 1990s, Israel offered Iran a $10 billion aid package and to help Iran negotiate a compromise with the United States over $5 billion in Iranian assets frozen after the 1979 Iranian revolution in exchange for information on Arad. The report also revealed that when Iran was negotiating long-term loans with Western European countries to prevent economic collapse, Israeli intelligence closely followed the negotiations and discovered a strategy of deceit used by Iranian negotiators to get better rates and longer terms out of European lenders by telling them that other lenders had offered better rates and longer terms. Israel threatened to expose this information if Arad was not released, and when Iran refused, Israel carried out its threat, which resulted in negotiations being halted. Israel threatened to expose more embarrassing information unless Arad was released. These details were revealed in 2005 in Yediot Ahronot.

In 1998 Ahmad Rezaee, the son of the former Iranian Revolutionary Guards commander Mohsen Rezaee who had defected to the United States, claimed to have some information on the location of Arad and was willing to use his contacts in Iranian intelligence to find out his specific fate. However, his monetary demands were considered excessive and Israel rejected his offer.

=== 2000s ===
In 2003, Israeli Prime Minister Ariel Sharon revealed that an intelligence agent had been killed during efforts to rescue Arad. In December 2003, an organization seeking information about Arad issued a reward of $10 million to anyone coming forward with such information.

In 2006, Hezbollah head Hassan Nasrallah publicly stated that Hezbollah believed Arad to be dead and his remains lost. This marked the first time they publicly acknowledged their lack of knowledge about Arad's whereabouts.

On 28 August 2006, the Lebanese Broadcasting Corporation broadcast new footage of Arad. It is unknown when the footage was recorded. In October 2007, Israel received a two-decade old letter written by Arad to his family.

On 29 June 2008, United Nations negotiator Gerhard Conrad informed the Israeli government that according to Hezbollah, Arad had been killed during an escape attempt in 1988.

In a news conference on 2 July 2008, held by Hassan Nasrallah, he stated that his group conducted a detailed investigation into the fate of the missing Israeli navigator. The investigation spanned three years, and included in-depth interviews with prominent figures in Lebanon. Nasrallah declined to indicate the findings of the investigation, but stated that a written report was handed to the United Nations representative mediating between the Lebanese group and the Israelis.

=== Farkash commission ===
In 2004, Aman, the IDF's military intelligence branch, formed a secret commission to investigate Arad's fate, headed by Major-General Aharon Ze'evi-Farkash. The investigation was based on interrogation transcripts and polygraph tests of Mustafa Dirani, intercepted messages, and intelligence gathered by Mossad and the IDF, including information from a 2004 Hezbollah investigation. The Farkash Commission concluded that Arad had died sometime between 1993 and 1997, with no signs of life received since 1995. According to the report, Arad had been captured by the Amal Movement, which openly demanded ransom money, arms, and a prisoner exchange. He was then abducted by Mustafa Dirani, then Amal's head of security, and was taken to the Beqaa Valley, where he was kept in hiding. When Dirani left Amal and defected to Hezbollah, he transferred Arad to Hezbollah custody. In early 1988, Arad was hidden in the village of Al-Nabi Shayth, where he was guarded by the Shukur clan. On May 5, 1988, his captors fled the area following Israeli bombing attacks. Arad was left behind, hidden in the bushes, and when the Shukur clan returned the next morning, they found that their prisoner had disappeared.

Dirani then contacted a leader of the Iranian Revolutionary Guard Corps. Both Dirani and Hezbollah later suspected that Arad had been picked up by Revolutionary Guard personnel and taken to Iran. The commission claimed that he was taken to Tehran in 1990, where he was held in strict secrecy and in complete isolation. Arad was transferred back to Lebanon following the capture of Mustafa Dirani in a 1994 Israeli commando raid, after the Iranians feared that Dirani would implicate them. Arad was held at a Revolutionary Guard facility in Lebanon. The report stated that Arad died after he became gravely ill and was refused medical treatment, and that he was buried by militiamen in the Beqaa Valley. Furthermore, both Iran and Hezbollah did not know the precise location where he was buried, and were unable to locate his gravesite. While the majority of the committee members concluded that Arad had died in early 1995, others said that he probably died in late 1996 or early 1997. The report's analysis also revealed that Hezbollah assumed that Arad had died around 1995.

Prime Ministers Ariel Sharon, Ehud Olmert and Benjamin Netanyahu refused to publish the results, and military censors only released the findings after Israeli journalist Ronen Bergman threatened to file a complaint with the Supreme Court. After the report became public, Prime Minister Netanyahu stated that Israel would continue to work under the assumption that Arad was alive, unless there was "conclusive evidence" that he was dead.

=== 2010s ===
In February 2016, a Lebanese man, Moufid Kuntar, claimed in court that Arad had been tortured to death while being interrogated in 1988 and was buried in a forest near Mount Lebanon. Kuntar was a commander of the Syrian Social Nationalist Party and claimed that the group captured Arad after he ejected. Kuntar was charged with spying for Israel's intelligence services, but claimed that he provided Israel with false information of Arad's fate until his court appearance.

In October 2016, news reports revealed that a joint investigation carried out by Mossad and IDF Military Intelligence, based on new information received over the previous two years, concluded that Arad had died in 1988.

=== 2020s ===
In October 2021, Prime Minister Naftali Bennett revealed that Mossad kidnapped an Iranian general in Syria to uncover information on the whereabouts of Ron Arad. A 2026 New York Times investigation identified the kidnapped Iranian general as Abdullah Saberi. The investigation also revealed that after completing the interrogation, Israel released him to Johannesburg, South Africa.

In December 2025, Ahmad Shukr, a retired Lebanese security officer and the brother of a militant involved in Arad's capture, disappeared from his hometown Al-Nabi Shayth. According to preliminary Lebanese investigations, he was lured to Zahlé by two Swedish citizens, where he went missing. According to Saudi media outlets, Lebanese security sources believe that the Mossad was behind his abduction as part of Israel's investigation into Arad's disappearance.

On 6 March 2026, at 10 p.m., Israeli commandos landed in Al-Nabi Shayth using helicopters in an attempt to locate Arad. The commandos were met with gunfire by residents and Hezbollah members, and Lebanese Army personnel also intervened, leaving three Lebanese soldiers dead. The Israelis dug up a grave belonging to Hussein Shukr at the Nabi Chit cemetery, suspecting Arad's remains were held there, however the search was unsuccessful and the soldiers withdrew without casualties at 3 a.m. the following morning. The raid was accompanied by airstrikes that killed at least 41 people and injured 40 more.

According to a November 2026 investigation by The New York Times, after Israel offered to release a senior Lebanese captive for genetic evidence from Arad in 2004, Nasrallah requested Iranian assistance. Iran sent IRGC General Abdullah Saberi to lead the investigation, and concluded that Arad had died and been buried in Nabi Chit in 1988; however, Saberi's dispatch to Lebanon only aroused Israeli suspicions that Iran was involved in Arad's kidnapping, and Israel concluded in 2005 that the IRGC had kidnapped him. In December 2006, IRGC Quds Force General Ali-Reza Asgari vanished after traveling to Istanbul; American officials told the NYT that he was abducted by the Mossad in relation to the Arad case, questioned on a boat in the Black Sea, and subsequently killed and dumped into the sea.

== Tribute ==
As a tribute to Ron Arad, the son of Yishai Aviram, the pilot for whom Arad served as the navigator during the ill-fated flight in 1986, requested in 2011 to personally pilot the helicopter that flew released POW Gilad Shalit back home after Shalit's release. The request was approved by Air Force commander Ido Nehoshtan.

== See also ==
- Israeli MIAs
- List of people who disappeared mysteriously in the 1980s
- Pidyon Shvuyim
- Disappearance of Ahmad Shukr
