= Fuad Shukr =

Lebanese militant leader (1961–2024)

- فؤاد شكر
- Shukr in 2014
- Born: 15 April 1961; Al-Nabi Shayth, Lebanon
- Died: 30 July 2024 (aged 63); Haret Hreik, Lebanon
- Military career
- Allegiance: Hezbollah
- Service years: 1982–2024
- Known for: 1983 Beirut barracks bombings
- Conflicts: Lebanese Civil War; South Lebanon conflict (1985–2000); 2006 Lebanon War; Syrian civil war; Israel–Hezbollah conflict (2023–2024) X

Fuad Shukr (Arabic: فؤاد شكر; 15 April 1961 (Note: 1962 is also listed.) – 30 July 2024; sometimes spelled Fouad Shukar and also known by his aliases Al-Hajj Mohsen or Mohsen Shukr) was a Lebanese militant leader who was a senior member of Hezbollah. A member of Hezbollah's founding generation, Shukr was a senior military leader in the organization from the early 1980s. For over four decades, he was one of the group's leading military figures and was a military advisor to its leader Hassan Nasrallah.

Shukr was, according to Israeli intelligence, a key figure in the transfer of Iranian guidance systems for Hezbollah's long-range missiles. He was believed to have played a role in the 1983 Beirut barracks bombings, that killed 241 U.S. and 58 French military personnel, six civilians and two attackers. The U.S. Department of State designated Shukr as a Specially Designated Global Terrorist in 2013.

On 30 July 2024, Shukr was killed in an Israeli airstrike in Beirut for his alleged responsibility for the Majdal Shams attack three days earlier, which killed 12 children.

== Early life ==
Shukr was born on 15 April 1961, at the village of Al-Nabi Shayth, in eastern Lebanon, which was also the birthplace of Hezbollah co-founder Abbas al-Musawi. After Hezbollah's establishment, the village became one of its central bases of power. Shukr's house in Al-Nabi Shayth is believed to be the last known location of Ron Arad, an Israeli fighter pilot who went missing in Lebanon in 1986. Shukr received his military education at Imam Hossein University in Tehran.

== Militant career ==
From the time of Hezbollah's founding by the Iranian Revolutionary Guard Corps (IRGC) in 1982, Shukr was one of its leading military figures. He was part of the group's founding generation and its most senior military commander, serving as an advisor on military operations to Hezbollah's leader Hassan Nasrallah. The militant organization's top military commander in southern Lebanon, he was on the Jihad Council, where his role was to serve as an advisor to Hezbollah's leadership on all matters related to military operations, including training with the IRGC's elite Quds Force.

A close associate of Imad Mughniyeh, Mustafa Badreddine, and Mustafa Shahada, Shukr fought against Israeli troops after the Israeli invasion of Lebanon in 1982. Shukr participated in the planning and execution of the 1983 Beirut barracks bombings, which resulted in the deaths of 307 people, including 241 U.S. military personnel and 58 French soldiers. Israel accused Shukr of direct involvement in the 2000 Hezbollah cross-border raid, in which Hezbollah abducted and killed three Israeli soldiers.

He was responsible for procuring the group's more advanced weapons arsenal, including precision-guided missiles, cruise missiles, antiship missiles, long-range rockets, and UAVs. According to U.S. intelligence, Shukr was sent to Tehran in 1994 to handle a shipment of Stinger missiles from Iran. His prominence grew after Mughniyeh was assassinated in Damascus in 2008.

By the outbreak of the Syrian Civil War, Shukr was Hezbollah's military commander in southern Lebanon, its most important sector. According to some reports, in 2016, Shukr replaced Badreddine as Hezbollah's military commander, after Badreddine was killed during Hezbollah's intervention in the Syrian Civil War.

The U.S. Department of State designated Shukr as a Specially Designated Global Terrorist in 2013 and added him to its Rewards for Justice Program (RFJ) on 10 October 2017, offering $5 million for information leading to his arrest. Shukr was added to the RFJ program alongside Hezbollah's head of foreign operations Talal Hamiyah as part of the first rewards for Hezbollah figures in a decade.

== Death ==
On 30 July 2024, Shukr was killed in an Israeli airstrike in Beirut for his alleged responsibility for the Majdal Shams attack on 27 July that killed 12 Druze children. Before the airstrike, he had received a call asking him to go from his office to his home. Shukr had his office on the second floor, and lived on the seventh floor of the same building. It is believed that the call was made after someone connected to Israel, breached Hezbollah's internal communications network, and saw it would be easier to target him at a higher floor. Hezbollah said that The Wall Street Journal report was "fabricated" and "full of lies". The attack also killed Iranian military adviser Milad Bedi, four civilians and injured 80 others. Shukr's funeral was held on 2 August.
