= Unit 121 =

Hezbollah assassination unit

- Active: 2000s – present
- Country: Lebanon
- Type: Covert assassination and commando unit
- Part of: Hezbollah

Commanders
- Notable commanders: Imad Mughniyeh; Mustafa Badr al-Din; Talal Hamiyeh

Unit 121 is Lebanese militant organization Hezbollah's covert assassination team reporting directly to the group's Secretary-General. The unit has conducted deadly car bombings targeting Lebanese military and political leaders and journalists, including former Lebanese Prime Minister Rafic Hariri, law enforcement officer Wissam Eid, military officials Wissam al-Hassan and François al-Hajj, diplomat Mohamad Chatah, and political activist Lokman Slim.

== Description ==
Unit 121 is the covert assassination team of the Lebanese militant organization Hezbollah, operating under the direct authority of the group's Secretary-General. The unit is highly secretive, consisting of dozens of operatives who are completely isolated from the rest of Hezbollah. Its operations are strictly conducted with prior approval from Hezbollah's leadership, reflecting the group's disciplined organizational structure. Hezbollah employs targeted killings to eliminate rivals and perceived threats, using its ranks of skilled bombmakers and a sophisticated command system designed to shield senior officials from accountability.

Unit 121 was formed under Hezbollah militant leader Imad Mughniyeh. After Mughniyeh's death in 2008, leadership passed to Mustafa Badr al-Din. After Badr al-Din's death in 2016, the unit came under Hezbollah Secretary-General Hassan Nasrallah, with Talal Hamiyeh assuming leadership of the unit.

== Operations ==
The unit has conducted deadly car bombings targeting Lebanese military and political leaders and journalists. As of 2020, Unit 121 had carried out at least four other assassinations, all by car bombings, in addition to the Hariri assassination: Wissam Eid, a Lebanese investigator of the Hariri killing; Wissam al-Hassan, a Lebanese army brigadier general and Hariri security chief; François al-Hajj, a Lebanese major general; and Mohamad Chatah, an economist and diplomat.

The unit's existence was revealed in 2020, when the Special Tribunal for Lebanon (STL), under the authority of the United Nations, determined that Unit 121 was responsible for 2005 assassination of Rafic Hariri that killed the former Lebanese Prime Minister and 21 others. On 18 August 2020, the STL convicted Salim Jamil Ayyash, the unit's commander, in absentia for leading the team that carried out the attack.

On 4 February 2021, Unit 121 assassinated political activist and Hezbollah opponent Lokman Slim. Ahead of Slim's assassination, Hezbollah pursued a campaign of political incitement against Slim.

== Responses ==
In March 2021, the U.S. offered a $10 million reward for information leading to Ayyash's capture. During the Israel-Hezbollah conflict, Israel killed Ayyash in an airstrike on 10 November 2024.

Hezbollah's opponents accuse Unit 121's operations as the hand of Iran.

== See Also ==
- List of extrajudicial killings and political violence in Lebanon
