= Basta, Beirut =

Basta البسطة
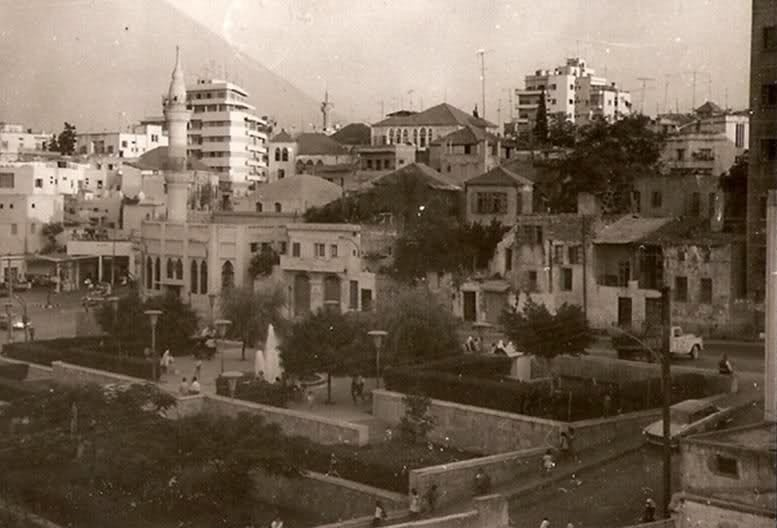
- Basta in 1970

- Location within Beirut
- Coordinates: 33.8861°N 35.5038°E
- Country: Lebanon

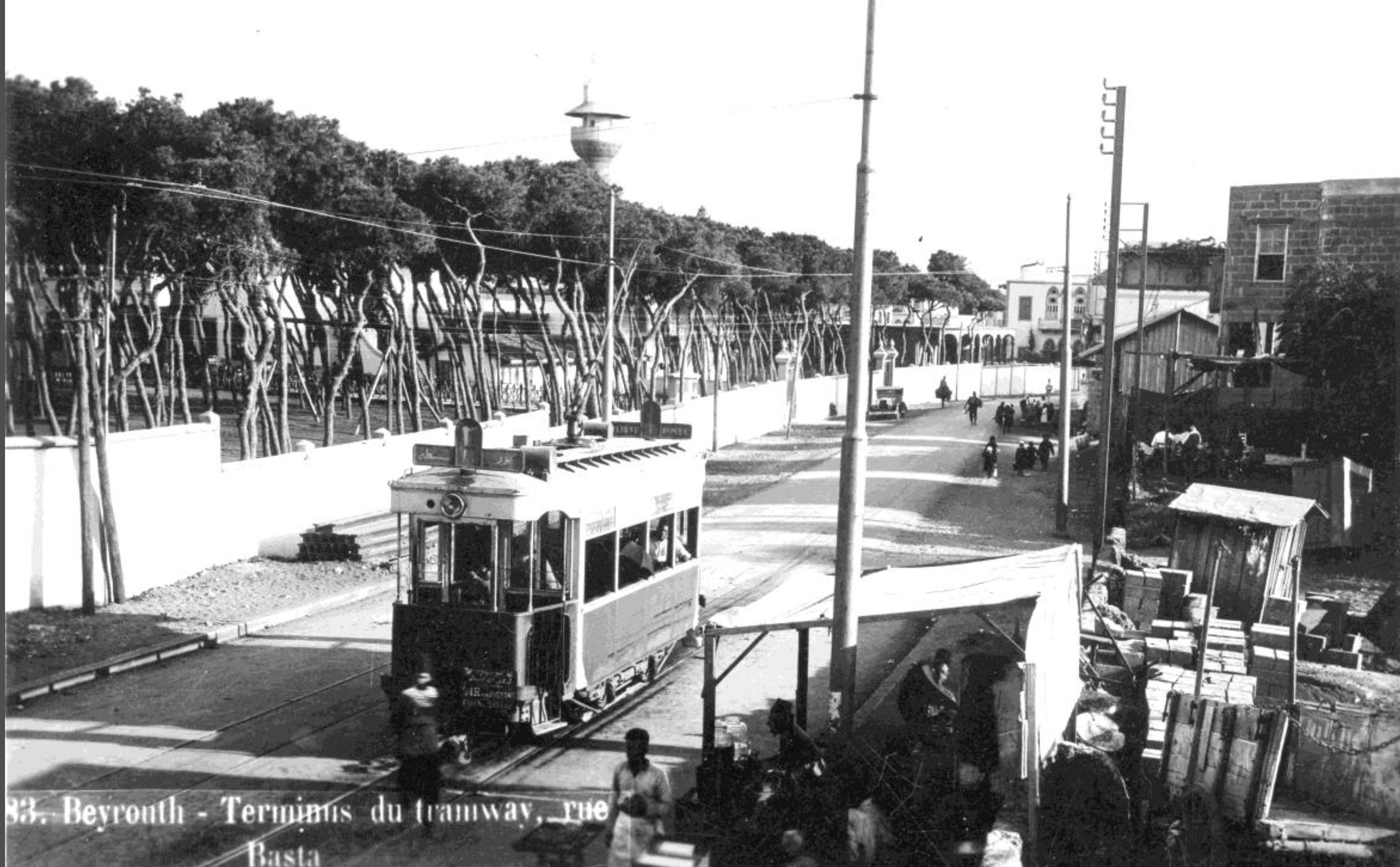
Tramway passing through Basta, 1925

al-Basta (Arabic: البسطة) is a neighborhood in Beirut, the capital of Lebanon. It is divided in two parts, Basta Fawka (upper) and Tahta (lower).

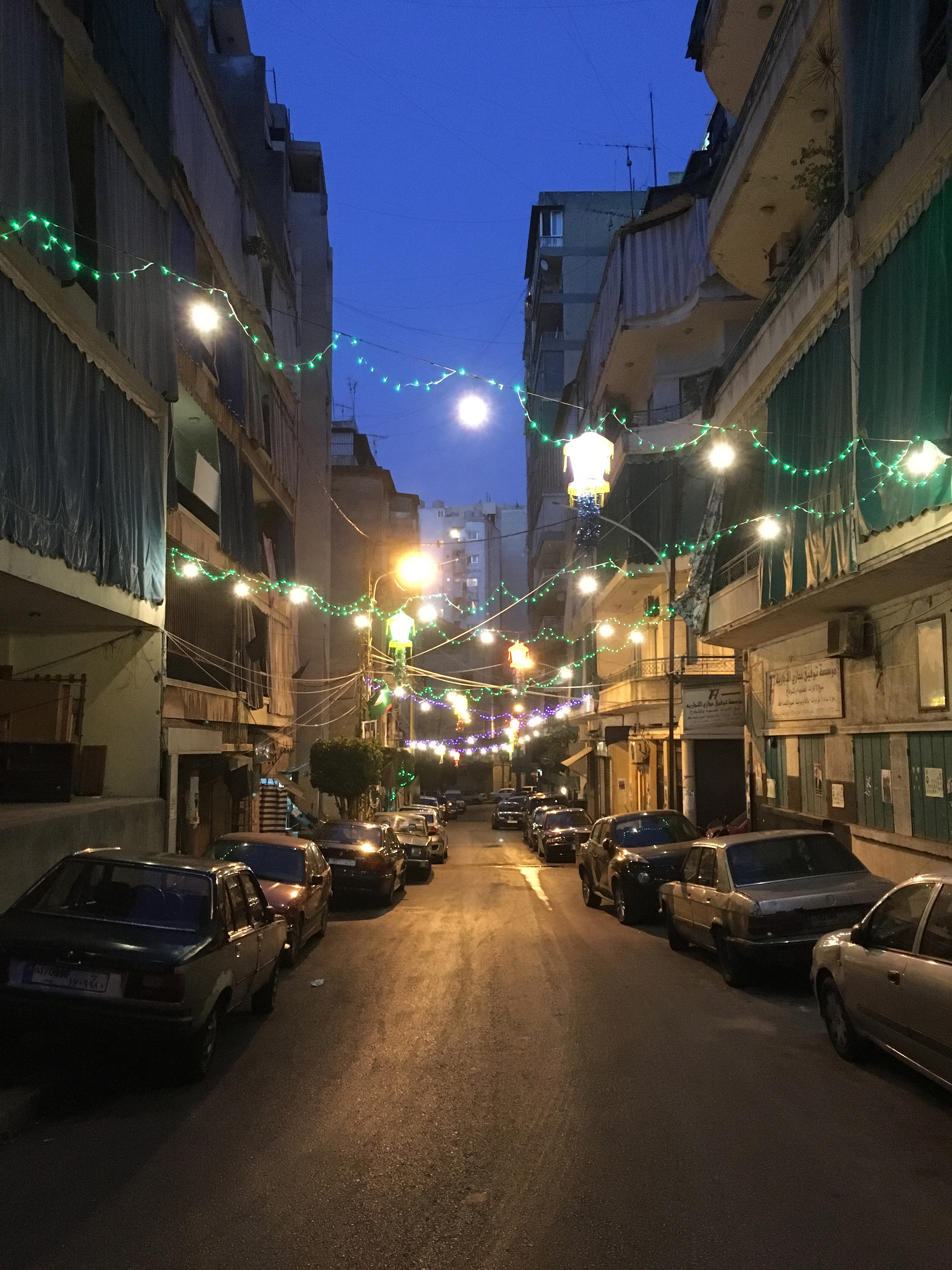
Ramadan scenes in al-Basta, 2016

The area is known for its antique shops.
