= Mustafa Badreddine =

Hezbollah member (1961–2016)

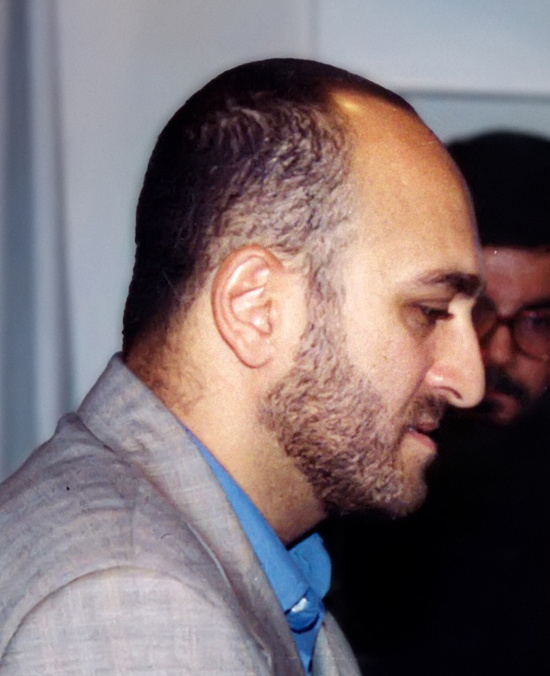
- Born: 6 April 1961; Al Ghobeiry, Lebanon
- Died: 12 May 2016 (aged 55); Damascus International Airport, Syria
- Burial place: Rawdat Shahidayn, Ghobeiry
- Citizenship: Lebanese
- Years active: 1983–2016
- Title: Hezbollah Chief of Staff
- Predecessor: Imad Mughniyeh
- Successor: Mustafa Mughnieyeh
- Political party: Hezbollah
- Spouse: Fatima Hareb
- Parents: Amine Badreddine (father); Fatima Jezeini (mother)
- Relatives: Imad Mughniyeh (cousin)

Mustafa Badreddine (Arabic: مُصْطَفَىٰ بَدْرِ الدِّينِ, romanized: Muṣṭafā Badr ad-Dīn; 6 April 1961 – 12 May 2016; also known by his aliases as Mustafa Amine Badreddine, Mustafa Youssef Badreddine, Sami Issa, and Elias Fouad Saab) was a Lebanese militant leader of Hezbollah and both the cousin and brother-in-law of Imad Mughniyeh.

He was nicknamed Zulfiqar, referring to the legendary sword of Ali. His death was seen as a massive loss in the Hezbollah leadership.

== Early life ==
Badreddine was born on 6 April 1961 in Al Ghobeiry, a municipality in the Baabda District. His parents were Amine Badreddine and Fatima Jezeini, both natives of South Lebanon.

== Hezbollah ==
Until 1982, Badreddine, like Imad Mughniyeh, was part of Fatah's Force 17, and later, they both joined the Islamic Jihad Organization which eventually merged into Hezbollah. Badreddine was among Hezbollah's bomb makers.

Badreddine was also a member of the Shura council for Hezbollah and the head of the unit for overseas operations, Hezbollah's external operations branch. His aide in this post was Abdul Hadi Hammade, who previously commanded Hezbollah's secret Position 71. Prior to his appointment to this post in 2009, replacing Imad Mughniyah, Badreddine served as the commander of Hezbollah's military arm and an advisor to Hezbollah's Secretary General Hassan Nasrallah. Badreddine's appointment as the head of overseas operation was not supported by deputy general secretary of Hezbollah, Naim Qassem. He was also Nasrallah's chief of intelligence.

Ya Libnan reported that he had been behind the bombing of the US Marine Corps barracks in Lebanon in 1983, killing 241 marines.

Following the beginning of the Syrian Civil War in 2011 Badreddine went to Syria as one of the Hezbollah commanders to defend the government of Bashar al-Assad. He joined the war in 2013. He was fighting with opposition groups in Aleppo's countryside.

Badreddine was behind the Al-Otaiba ambush that killed 175-200 alleged Al-Nusra fighters; later investigations by the Syrian transitional government would also uncover the remains of 150 civilians.

== Alleged activities ==
=== 1983 Kuwait bombings ===
Badreddine entered Kuwait in 1983 on a fake Lebanese passport under the name of Elias Al Saab. He was a member of the militant group Islamic Dawa Party.

He was arrested in Kuwait together with 17 suspects one month after seven blasts in the country on 13 December 1983, including the truck bombings of the US and French embassies in Kuwait City. The attacks left five people dead and 86 injured. However, it is also argued that the use of the group's name in these events was a deception to hide the real perpetrators. In 1985, Badreddine allegedly ordered the assassination of Kuwait emir, but the attempt failed.

As a result of the 16-week trials, he was sentenced to death for masterminding the attacks. Since his leg had been amputated, he was with a wooden leg in the jail. In the court, Badreddine told the prosecutor that he did not recognize the sovereignty of Kuwait.

In order to force the authorities to release Badreddine and others, Hezbollah members headed by Imad Mughniyeh kidnapped at least four Western citizens in Lebanon. Mugniyeh also hijacked a Kuwait Airways Corporation plane in Bangkok in 1988, demanding the release of him and other detainees.

Badreddine escaped from the prison in 1990 during the invasion of Kuwait or the Iraqis released the imprisoned Badreddine and the others.

Naharnet argues that after that event Badreddine managed to flee to Iran. Later, the Iran's Revolutionary Guard returned him to Beirut.

=== Hariri assassination ===
In June 2011, Badreddine and other three people were indicted for charges related to the assassination of former Lebanese Prime Minister Rafiq Hariri by the Special Tribunal for Lebanon (STL). The indictment was unsealed on 29 July 2011.

Badreddine was specifically accused of planning and supervising the assassination by the tribunal. In addition, he was described by the STL as the main planner of the operation. Accusations about him and three other Hezbollah members were based on mobile phone evidence. Hasan Nasrallah threatened the tribunal upon its declaration. Since then, Badreddine and the others disappeared and allegedly fled to Iran. On 1 February 2012, the STL decided to put him on trial in absentia. The trial would begin in March 2013, but it was postponed, and no date was specified, finally beginning in January 2014. During the trial, information regarding Hezbollah's assassination squad, Unit 121, responsible for a large number of political assassinations in Lebanon, was revealed.

=== Designation ===
Badreddine and Talal Hamiyah were put on the list of Specially Designated Global Terrorists by the US Treasury Department on 13 September 2012 due to his alleged role as top military commander, replacing Mugniyah who died in 2008. The basis for their designation was E.O. 13224 for providing support to Hezbollah's terrorist activities in the Middle East and around the world.

== Death ==
On 13 May 2016, it was reported that Badreddine had been killed by an explosion near the Damascus International Airport, the cause and timing of which remained unclear. At the funeral, Nasrallah, Secretary General of Hezbollah, said: "they would soon announce conclusions about the perpetrators". His corpse was taken to Ghobeiry, Beirut, where it was buried in Rawdat Shahidayn cemetery on 13 May.

=== Allegations ===
==== Hezbollah: "Takfiri groups" ====
Al Manar TV announced Badreddin's death stating that he was the target in a huge blast near the airport and that other Hezbollah fighters were wounded. The station added that the Hezbollah did not immediately point a finger at Israel and they would investigate whether the blast was from an airstrike, rocket attack or other cause. Then Hezbollah stated that an attack was launched by "Takfiri groups" and said: "Investigations have showed that the explosion, which targeted one of our bases near Damascus International Airport, and which led to the martyrdom of commander Mustafa Badreddine, was the result of artillery bombardment" carried out by Takfiri groups."

This claim is disputed by the Syrian Observatory for Human Rights, who said that no artillery fire had been heard in the area in the past three days and announced that "There is no truth about what have been published by Hezbollah about the assassination of its military commander in Syria 'Mustafa Bader' by rebel shells near the international airport of Damascus". Later aerial images of the site where Badreddine was killed were released that showed that the site did not show any artillery damage.

The killing of Badreddine has not been claimed by any of the various jihadist and rebel groups in and around Damascus. It is felt extremely unlikely that the Syrian rebels would have had the information and weaponry as the Middle East Eye reported that "the nearest opposition artillery positions … were 20 kilometres away, and there are doubts that their shells could achieve pinpoint accuracy from that distance." to carry out what seems to be a surgical strike as he was killed in a room and "nobody else was hurt. The conclusion: somebody followed him and knew exactly when he would arrive and when he would be in the room." If it was artillery as claimed, it shows that the security breach could only have come from Hezbollah.

==== Saudi, Israeli sources: Hezbollah with Iranian backing ====
The Saudi-owned Al Arabiya reported that Badreddine was killed by his former bodyguard, a man he trusted completely and one of Hezbollah's top operatives, Ibrahim Hussein Jazini and bodyguard of Hassan Nasrallah, by order of Nasrallah and Iranian general Qasem Soleimani. On 21 March 2017 the head of the Israel Defense Forces, Gadi Eizenkot, stated that Badreddine was killed by his own men due to internal rivalries, and the order to kill Badreddine was given by Hassan Nasrallah. Meanwhile an editorial in Haaretz argued that it was Soleimani who had him assassinated due to a reluctance to maintain fighters in Syria.

== See also ==
- Hezbollah involvement in the Syrian Civil War
- Imad Mughniyeh
- Mustafa Mughniyeh
