= Specially designated global terrorist =

United States terrorist designation

A specially designated global terrorist (SDGT) is a person or entity that has been designated as a terrorist by the United States Department of State or the U.S. Department of the Treasury.

== Designation ==
An SDGT designation is made under authority of U.S. Executive Order 13224 of September 23, 2001, as amended by Executive Order 13268 of July 2, 2002, and Executive Order 13284 of January 23, 2003, and Title 31, Parts 595, 596, and 597 of the U.S. Code of Federal Regulations, among other U.S. laws and regulations. The main regulatory framework underlying the SDGT designation was established two weeks after the September 11 attacks in 2001 by U.S. president George W. Bush.

One of the first organizations to which Executive Order 13224 was applied was the Palestinian-American charity The Holy Land Foundation for Relief and Development. Its offices were raided on 4 December 2001, its assets were seized and the organisation closed. The HLF was the largest Muslim charity in the United States, collecting £13,000,000 in donations in 2000.

SDGTs are entities and individuals who the Office of Foreign Assets Control (OFAC) finds have committed or pose a significant risk of committing acts of terrorism, or who OFAC finds provide support, services, or assistance to, or otherwise associate with, terrorists and terrorist organizations designated under OFAC Counter Terrorism Sanctions programs, as well as related persons, subsidiaries, front organizations, agents, or associates. They are designated under OFAC's programs.

The designation SDGT is one of several types of designations of persons to whom one or more OFAC-administered sanctions apply; these include country-specific and counter narcotics trafficking, non-proliferation, and transnational criminal organization-related sanctions, and potentially under sanctions related to illicit trading in rough diamonds, although this had not been applied of early November 2011.

OFAC publishes an integrated list of persons designated under its various sanctions programs that is known as the Specially Designated Nationals List, under which SDGT listings are included. Individuals and companies designated as "Specially Designated Nationals" are known as "SDNs". Most SDGT SDNs are foreign persons, but in at least one case—that of the late Anwar al-Awlaki (also known by various aliases)—an American citizen was designated as an SDGT.

To avoid designated persons or entities transferring funds out of the jurisdiction or otherwise rendering a determination ineffective, section 10 of Executive Order 13224 authorises the dispensing of prior notice of the determination to the persons subject to a determination.

Organizations designated as SDGTs include al-Qaeda, the Islamic State, Hamas, Hezbollah, the Houthi movement, Boko Haram and LTTE.

Notably, as the 21st century has progressed, several organized crime individuals have been officially added to the list, such as Dawood Ibrahim, Iván Archivaldo Guzmán Salazar, and Nemesio Oseguera Cervantes, as well as criminal organizations such as the Jalisco New Generation Cartel, Cartel of the Suns, Gulf Cartel, Sinaloa Cartel, La Nueva Familia Michoacana, Northeast Cartel, Carteles Unidos, Tren de Aragua, and Mara Salvatrucha.

== See also ==
- List of designated terrorist groups
- Specially Designated Terrorist
- Post-9/11
