= Hezbollah–Israel conflict (2023–present) =

- Part of the Hezbollah–Israel conflict, the Middle Eastern crisis (2023–present) and the Iran–Israel conflict during the Syrian civil war
- Israel Attested Hezbollah presence in Lebanon Lebanon under Israeli control Syria Israeli-occupied Golan Heights Areas ordered evacuated by Israel See here for a more detailed map
Date	8 October 2023 – present (Note: Despite the ceasefire calling for Israel's full withdrawal, Israel only partially withdrew, maintaining an occupation force in parts of Southern Lebanon.) (3 years, 3 weeks and 1 day)
Location	Israel, Lebanon and Syria
Status	Ongoing: Hezbollah's capabilities severely degraded; Assassination of Hassan Nasrallah, head of Hezbollah; Israel and Lebanon agree to a ceasefire on 26 November 2024; Sporadic fighting continues; 2026 Lebanon war between Hezbollah and Israel during the 2026 Iran war and the following assassination of Ali Khamenei; A 10-day truce agreed between Israel and Lebanon, later extended by 3 weeks and again extended for 45 days; Israel and Hezbollah agreed to a ceasefire, with Israel committing not to target Beirut's southern suburbs and Hezbollah vowing not to attack Israel, under a US proposal aiming to extend the ceasefire to all of Lebanon; Israel and Lebanon reached an agreement to renew the ceasefire, facilitated by the US, and to create "pilot zones", a deal rejected by Hezbollah; Israel and Hezbollah reached another truce; Israel and Lebanon reach a framework agreement, an agreement rejected by Hezbollah
Territorial changes	Israel maintains an occupation force in parts of Southern Lebanon

Belligerents
Hezbollah Allies: Amal Islamic Group SSNP-L Hamas Palestinian Islamic Jihad Popular Resistance Committees Popular Front for the Liberation of Palestine Islamic Resistance in Iraq (Yemen) Houthis Iran Syria (until 2024) Islamic Azz Brigades	Israel

Commanders and leaders
Naim Qassem; Hassan Nasrallah X Hashem Safieddine X Haytham Ali Tabatabai X Fuad Shukr X Ibrahim Aqil X Ali Karaki X	Benjamin Netanyahu; Israel Katz; Yoav Gallant (Note: Fired by Netanyahu as defense minister on 5 November 2024); Eyal Zamir; Herzi Halevi; Ori Gordin; Tomer Bar

Units involved
List of units: Hezbollah; (Hezbollah) Lebanese Resistance Brigades; (Hezbollah) Redwan Force; (Hezbollah) Imam Hussein Division; (Hezbollah) Badr Unit; (Hezbollah) Aziz Unit; (Hezbollah) Nasr Unit; (Hezbollah) Rocket and Missile Unit; (Hezbollah) Air defense unit; (Hezbollah) Engineering unit; (Hezbollah) Drone Unit; Syrian Hezbollah; Amal military wing; Al-Abbas Force; Fajr Forces; Khaled Ali unit; Eagles of the Whirlwind; Al-Qassam Brigades; Al-Aqsa Flood Vanguards; Al-Quds Brigades; Martyr Ali al Aswad Brigade; Al-Nasser Salah al-Deen Brigades; Abu Ali Mustafa Brigades; Harakat Hezbollah al-Nujaba; Yemeni Armed Forces (SPC); IRGC; Quds Force; Syrian Arab Armed Forces; Syrian Army; Syrian Air Defence Force; Islamic Azz Brigades	List of units: Israel Defense Forces; Israeli Ground Forces; Northern command; 36th division; Golani Brigade; 188th Armored Brigade; 53rd Battalion; 91st Division; 869th Battalion; 300th Territorial Brigade; 8th Armored Brigade; 210th division; 146th Division; Alon Brigade; Battalion 5030; Yiftach Brigade; 8679th unit; Israeli Air Force; Air Defense Command; Israeli Navy; Mossad

Casualties and losses
Lebanon: 4,047+ killed (before 2026) (Note: (per Hezbollah, Hamas, PIJ and Lebanese Health Ministry): 449+ Hezbollah members in Lebanon (Note: With 521 Hezbollah deaths confirmed as of 18 November 2024, including 67 in Syria, Archived 14 January 2024 at the Wayback Machine a total of 449 were confirmed to have died in Lebanon) (including 2 Saraya personnel); 40 Palestinian militants 25 killed (8 Oct 2023–31 March 2024; on the border), 7 killed (2 Jan 2024; in Beirut), 7 killed (3 April–15 June 2024; on the border), and a Hamas official assassinated on 9 August, total of 40 reported killed; 20 Amal Movement members; 16 Islamic Group members; 3 Islamic Azz Brigades fighters; 44 Lebanese security forces members; 1 Eagles of the Whirlwind fighter; 984+ civilians (including 248+ children and 736+ women); (610 killed until 15 September 2024 and 1,952+ killed since 16 September 2024)) (Note: Including casualties during the 2024 Israeli invasion of Lebanon); 16,638+ injured (before 2026); 1,200,000+ displaced in Lebanon; 3,980 killed (2026 war); 12,001 injured (2026 war); Per IDF: Between 4,000 and 5,000 Hezbollah operatives and commanders killed; 400+ militants killed during the ceasefire; 9,000 Hezbollah fighters injured; Per Hezbollah's estimates: Up to 5,000 Hezbollah fighters killed, 13,000 wounded; Syria: 557 killed (Note: (per Syrian Observatory for Human Rights): 290 Iran-backed militiamen; 83 Hezbollah fighters; 78 Syrian soldiers; 28 IRGC soldiers; 10 unidentified people; 68 civilians)	Israel: 87 security forces personnel killed (before 2026); 46 civilians killed (before 2026); 42 soldiers killed (2026 war); 3 civilians killed (2026 war); Per Hezbollah: 2,000+ casualties
- Lebanese displaced: 842,000 – 1.4 million+(October 2024), 201,000 (December 2024); 96,000 Israelis displaced 232 Syrian refugees killed by Israeli forces

An ongoing conflict between the Lebanese militant group Hezbollah and Israel began on 8 October 2023, when Hezbollah launched rockets and artillery at Israeli positions following Hamas's October 7 attacks on Israel. The conflict escalated into a prolonged exchange of bombardments, leading to extensive displacement in Israel and Lebanon. The conflict is part of the broader Middle Eastern crisis that began with Hamas's attack, with the short Israeli invasion of Lebanon in 2024 marking the largest escalation of the Hezbollah–Israel conflict since the 2006 Lebanon War. In Arabic, the conflict (2023–2024) is referred to as the "Support War" or the "Gaza Support War."

On 8 October 2023, Hezbollah started firing guided rockets and artillery shells at Israeli positions in the Shebaa Farms, which it said was in solidarity with Palestinians following the 7 October Hamas-led attack on Israel and beginning of Israeli bombing of the Gaza Strip. Israel retaliated by launching drone strikes and artillery shells at Hezbollah positions. Israel also carried out airstrikes throughout Lebanon and in Syria. In northern Israel, the ongoing conflict has forced approximately 96,000 individuals to leave their homes, while in Lebanon, over 1.4 million individuals had been displaced by late October. Hezbollah stated it would not stop attacks against Israel until it stops its military operations in Gaza; Israel said its attacks would continue until its citizens could return safely to the north.

In September 2024, Israel intensified its operations with two waves of electronic device attacks targeting Hezbollah's communication systems, and later assassinated the group's leading figures, including Secretary-General Hassan Nasrallah, and his successor, Hashem Safieddine. On 1 October, the Israeli military began an invasion of southern Lebanon, although it had been conducting limited ground operations for some time. Israeli operations led to the significant dismantling of Hezbollah's military infrastructure in southern Lebanon and the destruction of a large portion of its missile stockpile.

A 60-day ceasefire agreement was brokered and took effect on 27 November 2024. The ceasefire required Hezbollah to move its fighters north of the Litani River, approximately 30 kilometres (19 miles) from the Israeli border, while Israel began withdrawing its forces from southern Lebanon. The Lebanese Army was tasked with deploying around 5,000 soldiers to monitor the situation and maintain peace in the region. The ceasefire is being monitored by a panel of five countries, led by the United States, though Israel retains the right to strike at immediate threats in Lebanon during this period. The ceasefire was extended to 18 February 2025, at which time the Israel Defense Forces (IDF) withdrew from most of southern Lebanon. Airstrikes resumed on 2 March 2026 between Hezbollah and Israel following the 2026 Iran war and the killing of Ali Khamenei. On 16 April, President Trump announced that Israel and Lebanon agreed to a 10-day truce. On 23 April, Trump announced that Israel and Lebanon agreed to a three-week extension of the ceasefire. On 15 May, the truce was extended by Israel and Lebanon for another 45 days. On 1 June, Israel and Hezbollah agreed to a ceasefire, with Israel committing not to target Beirut's southern suburbs and Hezbollah vowing not to attack Israel, under a US proposal aiming to extend the ceasefire to all of Lebanon. On 3 June, Israel and Lebanon reached an agreement to renew the ceasefire, facilitated by the US, and to create "pilot zones". On 4 June, Hezbollah rejected the previously announced truce deal, demanding instead a comprehensive truce and a full withdrawal of Israel from Lebanon. On 19 June, President Trump announced that Israel and Hezbollah have reached a truce, facilitated by the US, Qatar, and Iran. On 26 June, US Secretary of State Marco Rubio announced a framework deal between Israel and Lebanon for "lasting peace and security" via US mediation. The agreement includes a cease-fire, requiring Hezbollah to end hostilities and withdraw from southern Lebanon, but it was subsequently rejected by Hezbollah.

== Background ==
=== Founding of Hezbollah ===
Hezbollah is a Lebanese Shiite political party and paramilitary group, formed in 1982 by Muslim clerics with Iranian funding to fight the Israeli invasion of Lebanon. After the war, Israel continued to hold borderland buffer zone in southern Lebanon with the aid of proxy militants in the South Lebanon Army (SLA). In 2000, Israel withdrew from South Lebanon to the UN-designated and internationally recognized Blue Line border. Hezbollah quickly took control of the area. It has justified its continued existence, occupation, and attacks on Israel by citing both allegations of Lebanese prisoners in Israel and continued Israeli control of the Shebaa farms region, occupied by Israel from Syria in 1967 but considered by Hezbollah to be part of Lebanon. Elimination of the state of Israel has been a primary goal for Hezbollah from its inception. Hezbollah opposes the government and policies of the State of Israel.

=== Palestinian factions in Lebanon ===
Since the 1948 Palestinian expulsion and flight, Palestinian refugees have had a presence in Southern Lebanon as numerous refugee camps were established, which brought many Palestinian factions into south Lebanon, with it being often used as a center to launch rockets into northern Israel. The Palestine Liberation Organization was based in Lebanon after being expelled from Jordan by King Hussein in July 1971. After they were involved in an insurgency in Southern Lebanon, until they were expelled to Tunis after the 1982 Lebanon War.

=== UN Security Council Resolution 1701 ===
A ceasefire was reached between Israel and Hezbollah at the end of the 2006 Lebanon War, based on the terms of UN Security Council Resolution 1701 which called for a demilitarized zone between the southern border of Lebanon and the Litani river. The UN Security Council resolution mandated only the Lebanese army and United Nations Interim Force in Lebanon (UNIFIL) could be armed in southern Lebanon. It also stated that neither side should cross the Blue Line, which marks the border between Lebanon and the Golan Heights, and divides the village of Ghajar between the two. Despite this, both Israel and Hezbollah have outstanding obligations under UNSCR 1701.

Since 2006, Hezbollah fortified southern Lebanon, obstructed UNIFIL's access, built tunnels into Israel, and crossed the Blue Line. Israel has also accused Hezbollah of using a local environmental organization as a front for its military activities near the Blue Line. After retreating behind the Blue Line in 2000, Israel reoccupied the whole of Ghajar in 2006, including the Lebanese part of the village. Israel continues to occupy Ghajar and an adjacent area, and has repeatedly breached Lebanese airspace, waters, and borders. UNIFIL reports that Israel entered Lebanese airspace on more than 22,000 occasions between 2007 and 2021.

=== April and July 2023 skirmishes ===
On 6 April 2023, in response to the 2023 Al-Aqsa clashes, dozens of rockets were fired from Lebanon into Israel, injuring three Israeli civilians. The Israel Defense Forces said that it intercepted 25 rockets fired from Lebanon, which it said were fired by Palestinian factions Hamas and PIJ with Hezbollah's approval. The attacks were the largest escalation between the two countries since the 2006 Lebanon War. The United Nations Interim Force in Lebanon (UNIFIL) described the situation as "extremely serious" and urged restraint. On 15 July, the IDF fired warning shots and used riot dispersal munitions on 18 people, including journalists and parliamentarians that crossed the border from Lebanon and walked 80 meters into Israeli-occupied territory.

=== Gaza war ===
On 8 October 2023, a day after Hamas launched its 7 October 2023 attacks on Israel and Israel began its bombing of Gaza, Hezbollah joined the conflict in "solidarity with the Palestinians", initially firing on Israeli military outposts in Shebaa Farms and the Golan Heights—both territories under Israeli occupation. Since then, Hezbollah and Israel have been involved in cross-border military exchanges that have displaced entire communities in Israel and Lebanon, with significant damage to buildings and land along the border. From 7 October 2023 to 20 September 2024, there were 10,200 cross border attacks, of which Israel launched 8,300. Over 96,000 people in Israel, and over 111,000 in Lebanon, have been displaced during this period. Israel and Hezbollah have maintained their attacks at a level that causes harm without escalating into a full-scale war.

Hezbollah has stated it will continue attacking Israel until Israel halts its operations in Gaza, where over 40,000 Palestinians had been killed. Israel demanded that Hezbollah implement UNSC 1701 and withdraw its forces north of the Litani River. Diplomatic efforts, led by U.S. envoy Amos Hochstein and France, have so far been unsuccessful in resolving the conflict. In November 2023, Israeli defense minister Yoav Gallant warned that Beirut could meet the same fate as Gaza. He made the same warning in January 2024. In June 2024, Gallant visited the United States, seeking support for an escalation of the war with Hezbollah and a possible ground invasion in Lebanon.

== Events ==
=== Outbreak of fighting (October 2023 – March 2024) ===
IDF footage of strike on Hezbollah infrastructure in the Shebaa Farms

In the morning of 8 October, Hezbollah fired rockets and shells at the Shebaa Farms region in support of Hamas's attack onto Israel; in response, the Israel Defense Forces (IDF) fired artillery shells and a drone into southern Lebanon. Two Lebanese children were reportedly injured by broken glass.

The next day, Israel exchanged a series of airstrikes on southern Lebanon near the towns of Marwahin, Ayta ash Shab and Dhayra in the Bint Jbeil district. This was after numerous Palestinian militants infiltrated the Israeli border, which Hezbollah denied involvement with. The Palestinian Islamic Jihad militia claimed responsibility for the armed infiltration. The IDF killed at least two perpetrators (likely Palestinians), while a third returned to Lebanon. A Hezbollah media source announced three of Hezbollah's members died in the IDF retaliation. Hezbollah fired rockets and artillery in retaliation. During the clashes, two Israeli soldiers and Lt. Col Alim Abdallah, Deputy Commander of the IDF's 300th Brigade, were killed and another three were wounded.

On 11 October, Hezbollah fired anti-tank missiles at an IDF position and claimed to have produced casualties. In response, the IDF shelled the area where the attack was launched. The Lebanese-Italian hospital in Tyre admitted three injured civilians. The IDF ordered residents of northern Israel to seek shelter following reports of drones being launched from southern Lebanon. A Patriot missile was launched to intercept a suspicious projectile, after which the IDF found that the object in question was not a drone. Warning sirens were activated across northern Israel after reports emerged that up to 20 infiltrators on paragliders had entered Israeli territory from Lebanon before the IDF dismissed the report as a false alarm.

Hezbollah deputy chief Sheikh Naim Qassem said "when time comes for any action, we will carry it out," stating that Hezbollah was ready and would contribute to confrontations against Israel according to its own plan. The IDF fired artillery, into southern Lebanon following an explosion that caused minor damage to a section of the Israel–Lebanon border wall near the kibbutz of Hanita.

The IDF released footage of a drone attack which, according to them, killed three infiltrators from Lebanon near Margaliot who were members of Hamas. One of them was acknowledged by Hezbollah as one of their members. In the afternoon, Hezbollah fired 50 mortar shells and six anti-tank missiles towards five Israeli outposts in the Shebaa Farms. Further IDF shelling killed two civilians in a Shebaa village; video and photographic evidence showed usage of phosphorus bombs.

On 15 October, Hezbollah launched five anti-tank missiles towards northern Israel killing one civilian and injuring three others in Shtula. UNIFIL said that their headquarters in Naqoura in southern Lebanon was hit by rocket fire with no casualties reported. Lieutenant Amitai Granot, commander of the 75th Battalion of the IDF's Golan Brigade and son of Rabbi Tamir Granot, was killed in a missile attack on an IDF post bordering Lebanon.

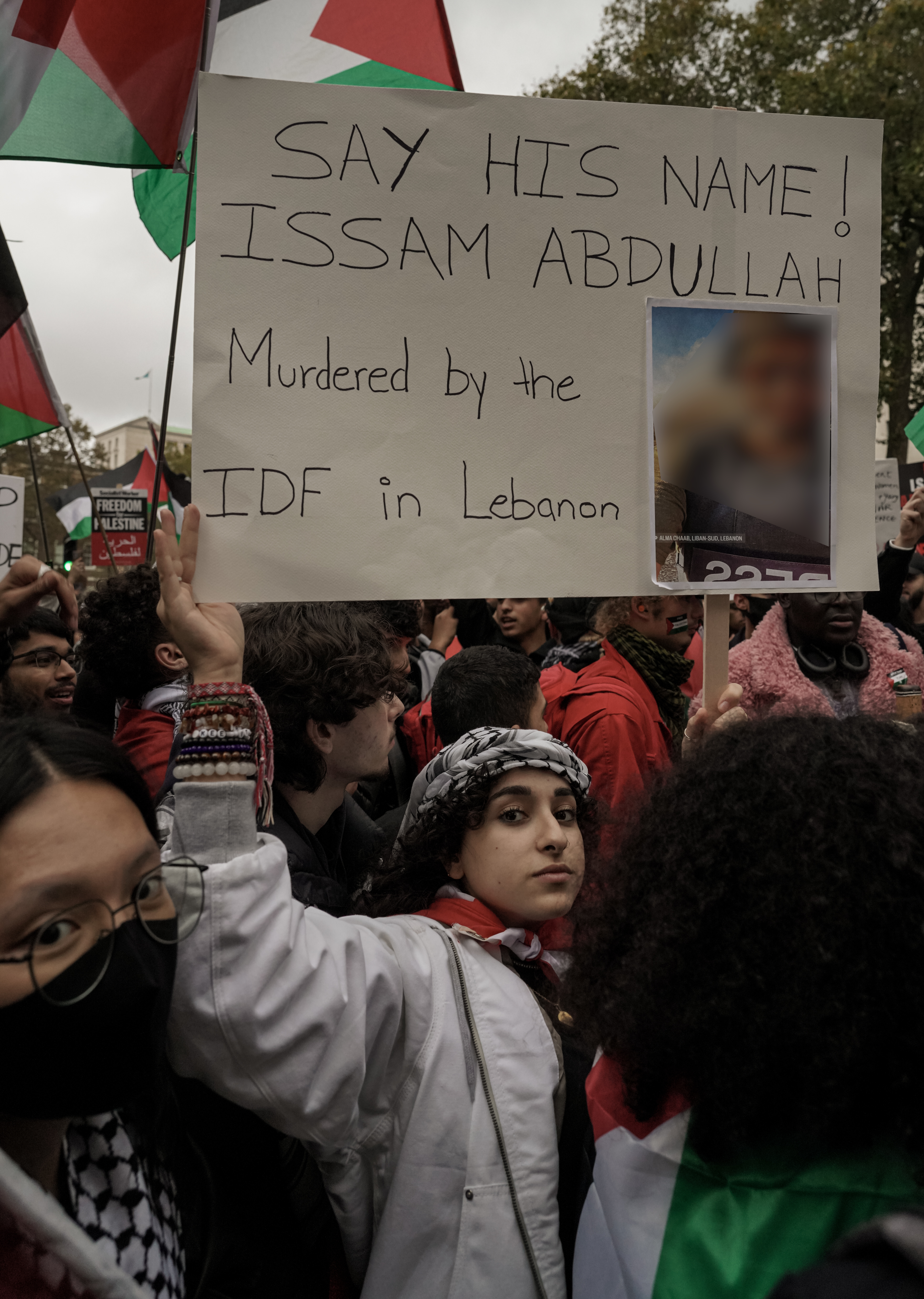
A protester holding up a sign of Issam Abdallah during mass demonstrations in London

On 13 October, when a group of Reuters, AFP and Al Jazeera journalists who were transmitting a live video feed of cross-border shelling for more than 45 minutes panned to focus on an IDF outpost in Aalma ech Chaab, two tank rounds fired directly hit the group. The first killed Reuters photojournalist Issam Abdallah. The second strike was much more powerful and ignited the Al Jazeera vehicle, a white Toyota, which Al Jazeera journalists Carmen Joukhadar and Elie Brakhya, as well as their AFP colleague Dylan Collins were standing next to. Reuters photographer Christina Assi was also critically injured. The Lebanese Army has said the IDF fired the missile that killed Abdallah. Another Reuters reporter at the scene said Abdallah was killed by projectiles fired from the direction of Israel. His last post on Instagram, posted a week before he was killed, was a photograph of Shireen Abu Akleh, a Palestinian journalist for Al Jazeera Arabic who had been killed by Israel in 2022.

On 16 October, Amnesty International reported that the IDF fired white phosphorus shells into Dhayra, hospitalizing nine civilians and setting fire to civilian objects. Aya Majzoub, Amnesty International's Deputy Regional Director for the Middle East and North Africa, described the attack as a violation of international law that needed to be investigated as a war crime, and that it "seriously endangered the lives of civilians, many of whom were hospitalized and displaced, and whose homes and cars caught fire".

Lebanese state media reported that Dhayra and other areas along the western section of the border came under "continuous" bombardment overnight. In the early morning it was reported that multiple people were suffering from symptoms of suffocation after the IDF allegedly fired white phosphorus shells on the village. Three people were injured after an anti-tank missile from Lebanon landed in the Israeli town of Metula. Hezbollah announced that five of its members were killed on the same day but it was unclear if any had involvement in the border infiltration.

On 19 October, the Lebanese Armed Forces said that one person was killed and another injured after a group of seven Iranian journalists were targeted with machine guns by Israel, although Iranian state media denied the claim and said that all its journalists were "alive and healthy". UNIFIL peacekeepers said that one person was killed when civilians were caught in a cross-fire at the border. The Lebanese Army requested assistance by UNIFIL to de-escalate the situation, and Israel was asked to suspend fire to allow the rescue operation to proceed. Israel started evacuating the settlements located close to the border with Lebanon in October 2023 with more than 60 thousand evacuated by April 2024.

In the early afternoon of 21 October, several rockets were fired from Lebanon toward the Shebaa Farms; there were no injuries. The IDF conducted a drone strike on the team of militants that launched the rockets. A short while later, anti-tank guided missiles were fired from Lebanon toward Margaliot and Hanita; two foreign workers were injured. The IDF conducted airstrikes against the missile teams. In the evening, another anti-tank guided missile was fired from Lebanon toward Bar'am. One IDF soldier was seriously injured and two others suffered minor injuries. The IDF responded with several airstrikes in southern Lebanon, some of which targeted other missile teams preparing attacks.

The IDF conducted airstrikes against two Syrian military positions on 24 October in southwestern Syria, marking the first time the IDF publicly targeted the Syrian military since the Israel–Gaza war began. Hezbollah attacked 19 IDF military sites with missiles and artillery shells and fired one-way attack drones at an IDF position for the first time since the conflict began.

==== November 2023 ====
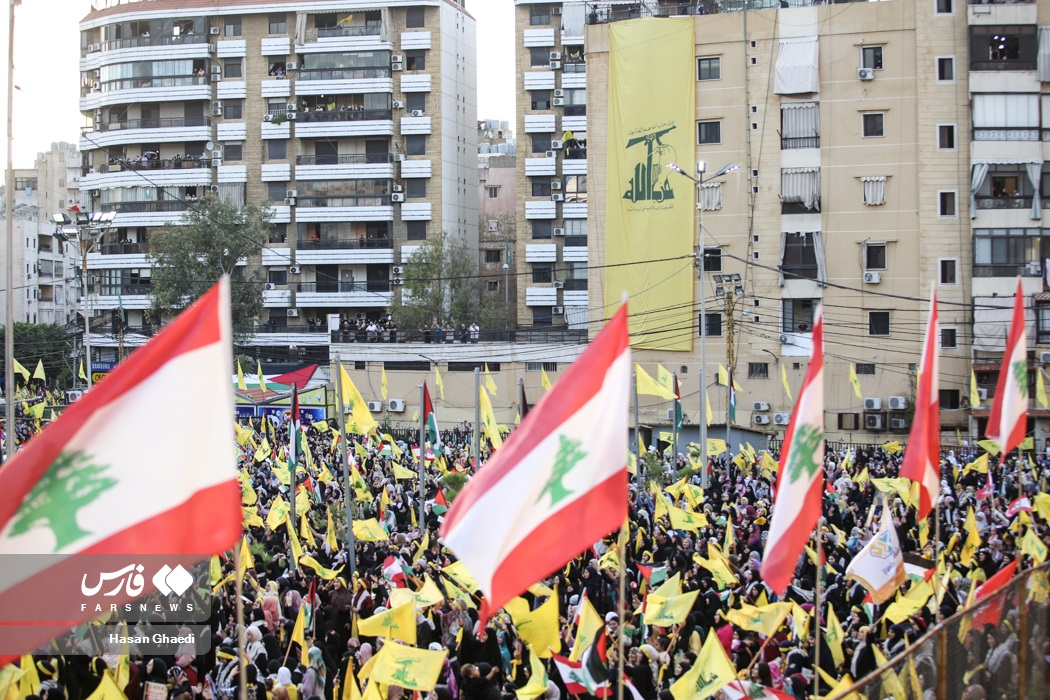
Hezbollah supporters attend a Hassan Nasrallah speech in Beirut, 3 November 2023

In his widely awaited first speech since the start of the war in Gaza on 3 November, Hezbollah leader Hassan Nasrallah said the presence of U.S. warships in the Mediterranean "doesn't scare us". On 5 November, Hezbollah shot down an Israeli Elbit Hermes 450 drone over Nabatieh, with wreckage falling over houses in the towns of Zabdin and Harouf. One Israeli civilian was killed when anti-tank missiles hit the Yiftah kibbutz.

Four people were reportedly injured after an Israeli bombing that hit two ambulances. Later, an Israeli airstrike hit two civilian cars in Lebanon between the towns of Aynata and Aitaroun, killing one woman, three of her granddaughters between the ages of 10 and 14, and severely injured her daughter. In response, Hezbollah fired at Kiryat Shmona, killing an Israeli civilian.

The Al-Qassam Brigades took responsibility for firing 16 rockets from Lebanon targeting areas south of Haifa. Meanwhile, Israel reported at least 30 rockets being fired in which the IDF fired back at the sources. Hezbollah and Al-Qassam brigades also conducted four cross-border attacks into northern Israel. Hezbollah deputy general Naim Qassem said that the group could be forced into wider conflict over Israeli attacks in Gaza.

On 10 November, Hezbollah launched anti-tank missiles into an IDF post in Manara which injured three soldiers. The IDF attacked the sources of fire in response. Hezbollah conducted three drone attacks into northern Israel targeting IDF positions and civilians. One drone was intercepted while two others landed on Israeli territory. Seven Hezbollah members were killed during the clashes. The IDF shelled Meiss Ej Jabal Hospital, injuring a doctor. Lebanon's Ministry of Public Health condemned the attack, saying that "Israeli authorities were fully responsible for this unjustifiable act, which would have led to catastrophic results", and called for an investigation.

The Amal Movement, an ally of Hezbollah, announced that a fighter was killed in a missile attack in the village of Rab El Thalathine which also wounded two other members on 11 November. These were the first casualties from the group since it joined the fighting. On 12 November, Hezbollah anti-tank missile and mortar attacks killed an employee of the Israel Electric Corporation who was conducting repair work and injured 21 other Israelis, including seven IDF members and six of the fatality's colleagues. Hezbollah also struck an IDF bulldozer in a separate attack. The IDF said it had launched a drone strike at a militant cell that tried to launch antitank missiles near Metula. Further clashes also killed one Hezbollah member.

Following a Hezbollah strike on 13 November, the IDF responded with heavy shelling across southern Lebanon which reportedly killed two people, according to a first-responder organisation affiliated to the Hezbollah-allied Amal Movement. Unidentified fighters fired anti-tank guided missiles that injured two Israelis near Netu'a. An Israeli rocket struck near journalists in Yaroun, Lebanon, no casualties were reported. Hezbollah condemned the attack, which happened while the journalists were on a public tour in the town.

On 16 November, Hezbollah conducted eight anti-tank missiles targeting Israeli forces and military infrastructure. In the afternoon, Hezbollah attacked numerous towns near the border and targeted military gatherings in Shtula and Hadab Yaron. The IDF responded heavily in southern Lebanon and Israeli warplanes raided Hezbollah targets. Hezbollah announced that two of its members were killed.

Four days later, the IDF base of Biranit suffered heavy damage from a Hezbollah barrage using Burkan rockets. IDF fighter jets struck numerous Hezbollah military targets, and soldiers struck a militant cell near Metula. The historically significant St. George church was heavily damaged in Yaroun after it was shelled by the IDF. The house of Amal Movement MP Kabalan Kabalan was also hit with rocket fire. Hezbollah claimed an attack on the IDF's 91st Division barracks at Baranit.

On 21 November, an IDF airstrike in Kafr Kila killed an elderly woman and injured her granddaughter. Another team of journalists were targeted in an IDF strike near Tayr Harfa which killed three people, including two Al Mayadeen journalists, a reporter and a photojournalist, and a guide. On the same day, four members of the Al-Qassam Brigades were killed after an IDF strike on a car near Chaaitiyeh. A Hezbollah member was also killed in a separate attack in Khiam.

Hezbollah told Al Jazeera that it would "respect" the temporary ceasefire deal between Israel and Hamas reached on 24 November 2023. Subsequently, Hezbollah decreased its military operations briefly which also prompted the IDF to decrease its shelling of targets in southern Lebanon. Many displaced civilians reportedly returned to their homes amid the calm. Still, Hezbollah claimed 23 other attacks into northern Israel until the breaking of the ceasefire on 30 November.

On 25 November, a UNIFIL patrol unit was hit by IDF gunfire in the vicinity of Aitaroun where there were no casualties. UNIFIL condemned the incident and called on parties to be reminded "of their obligations to protect peacekeepers and avoid putting the men and women who are working to restore stability at risk."

==== December 2023 ====
On 1 December, Hezbollah claimed five attacks on the Israel–Lebanon border. The IDF shelled Hula, killing two civilians, and the village of Jebbayn, killing an additional person. The IDF also struck a Hezbollah site and a Hezbollah cell preparing to carry out an attack near Malkia. Hezbollah announced the death of one of their members, presumably from one of the IDF strikes. The next day, Hezbollah fired several rockets at Israeli army posts along the border. Israel responded with airstrikes and artillery shelling against Hezbollah sites. Hezbollah stated that one of its fighters were killed.

On 3 December, Hezbollah fired one anti-tank guided missile targeting an IDF base in Beit Hillel, injuring 11 Israelis and Global Affairs Canada announced that a Canadian citizen was killed in Lebanon. On 4 December, Hamas announced the creation of a new unit in Lebanon named the "Al-Aqsa Flood Vanguards" and called on "the youth and men of our people to join the vanguard resistance fighters and take part in shaping the future and liberating Jerusalem and the al-Aqsa Mosque." This created a negative reaction by many Lebanese politicians as they said that it would be a threat to Lebanon's sovereignty.

One Lebanese soldier was killed and three others were injured by an Israeli attack on a Lebanese Army base in Odaisseh. The IDF later apologized for the incident, saying that it would investigate. A farm worker from Syria, was killed in an Israeli artillery attack on a poultry farm near Arnoun that also injured two of his relatives. Israeli defense minister Yoav Gallant met with mayors and local council heads in Nahariya, northern Israel to discuss the threat of Hezbollah to northern residents. Gallant said that if diplomacy fails, Israel will use its military to force Hezbollah north of the Litani River.

On 11 December, the mayor of the southern Lebanese village of Taybeh was killed in an Israeli airstrike. Two other Hezbollah fighters were killed by Israeli airstrikes and artillery shelling in Aitaroun, and three civilians were injured. Other airstrikes were carried out by the IAF, destroying five houses and damaging 17 others. Four batches of missiles fired from Lebanon towards northern Israel were intercepted by the Iron Dome defense system, while the Islamic Resistance claimed it attacked several Israeli sites. According to Israeli media, three soldiers were injured. Hezbollah and other militias attacked nine Israeli towns and military positions. Israeli war cabinet minister and former defense minister Benny Gantz discussed security in northern Israel in a phone call with US secretary of state Antony Blinken. Gantz said he conveyed that Hezbollah's heightened aggression and attacks mean that Israel must "remove" the threat from northern Israel. Gantz's statement singled out the Lebanese state, not just Hezbollah, and called for international pressure on Lebanon to stop attacks on its southern border.

The Syrian Social Nationalist Party in Lebanon announced the death of one member of their military wing, the Eagles of the Whirlwind, on 15 December. The IDF said that one in five rockets launched by Hezbollah had landed in Lebanese territory and published an infographic showing failed rocket launches into Israel. On 16 December, a soldier from the IDF's 129th Battalion was killed by a Hezbollah drone strike near Margaliot, which also caused a fire in a building. Two other soldiers were injured. Another drone was shot down by the IDF, which also responded to the infiltrations by shelling targets. The IAF later hit several Hezbollah targets inside Lebanon, including rocket launch sites and military infrastructure. On 22 December, two IDF soldiers of the 188th Armored Brigade were killed by a Hezbollah rocket attack in the Shtula area.

On the morning of 23 December, IDF aircraft bombed a house in Kfar Kila and intense artillery fire also took place on the outskirts of Deir Mimas The IDF conducted a raid near a UNIFL center along the Khardali River. An Al-Manar cameraman was injured in the eye after an IDF attack on a road in the al-Khardali area where correspondents of MTV and the state-owned National News Agency were also passing. Hezbollah announced that two of their members were killed on that day. On 24 December, senior IRGC general Razi Mousavi was killed by an Israeli airstrike in Damascus. On 26 December, a Hezbollah anti-tank missile hit St. Mary's Greek Orthodox Church in Iqrit, northern Israel. A civilian suffered serious injuries, and when IDF responders arrived at the scene, another missile was fired, injuring nine soldiers. On 30 December, Israeli airstrikes targeted an Iranian arms shipment in the Syrian border city of Abu Kamal, killing 25 militiamen.

==== January 2024 ====
On 2 January, Israel conducted an airstrike in the Dahieh neighborhood of Beirut, resulting in the assassination of Saleh al-Arouri, the deputy chairman of the Hamas political bureau, and the death of six other members. Al-Arouri was also responsible for the expansion of Hamas's activities in the Israeli-occupied West Bank, including attacks on Israelis. The assassination occurred one day before Hezbollah commemorated the fourth anniversary of the assassination of senior Iranian military commander Qasem Soleimani. On 6 January, Hezbollah launched approximately 40 rockets into northern Israel, describing it as an "initial response" to al-Arouri's killing. According to Israel, the rockets targeted a Air traffic Control Base near Mount Meron, causing significant damage to it.

On 8 January, Israel assassinated Wissam al-Tawil, the deputy commander of Hezbollah's Redwan Force, whom it accused of carrying out the attack on Meron airbase two days earlier. In response to al-Tawil's killing, Hezbollah launched a drone attack on Israel's Northern Command headquarters in Safed on the following day, situated approximately 20 kilometres (12 mi) from the border. Ali Hussein Barji, the commander of Hezbollah's aerial forces in southern Lebanon who was reportedly responsible for the attack, was killed by an airstrike, according to Israel, alongside three other Hezbollah members, in Khirbet Selm shortly before al-Tawil's funeral began. However, Hezbollah denied that Barji was killed.

On 11 January, two Hezbollah-linked search-and-rescue personnel were killed and an unspecified number of civilians were wounded during an Israeli air raid on the town of Hanine. The IDF said that they killed four militants that infiltrated the Israeli border through Shebaa while an IDF unit was patrolling nearby on 14 January. Five IDF soldiers were wounded. A group calling itself the "Islamic Glory Brigades" later claimed responsibility for the attack and announced that 3 of their members were killed and 2 were able to escape. The same day, two Israeli civilians; a man and his 70-year-old mother, were killed by Hezbollah anti-tank missiles in Kfar Yuval.

On 20 January, Brigadier General Sadegh Omidzadeh, an intelligence officer with the IRGC's Quds Force in Syria, along with four other IRGC officers, were reportedly killed in an Israeli airstrike in Damascus. According to the Syrian Observatory for Human Rights, an Israeli missile strike targeted a four-story building in the Mezzeh district. The attack resulted in the death of thirteen individuals, including five Iranians, and the complete destruction of the building where leaders aligned with Iran were having a meeting. The next day, in southern Lebanon, Sky News Arabic reported that Fadi Suleiman, a senior field commander of Hezbollah, survived an Israeli attack near a military checkpoint in Kafra. His bodyguard was killed in the same attack.

==== February 2024 ====
Between 3 and 5 February, five Amal movement fighters were reported killed: two in airstrikes in Blida and three in Bayt Lif. On 8 February, the IDF conducted a drone strike on a car in Nabatieh. Israeli media said a regional Hezbollah commander named Abbas al-Dabs was assassinated in the attack. A day before, two Hezbollah members, including al-Dabs, were named by Israeli intelligence as reportedly working alongside IRGC officers on building Iranian air defenses in Syria.

On 10 February, an Israeli drone struck a car near Sidon, killing at least two people and wounding two others. An Israeli security source said the target of the strike was Hamas official Basel Saleh, who was "injured to an unknown extent". Saleh was responsible for enlisting new Hamas recruits in Gaza and the West Bank. On 12 February, another assassination attempt took place targeting Hezbollah official Mohammed Abd al-Rasoul Alawiya in his car in Bint Jbeil.

On 14 February, in the deadliest day of fighting, a barrage of eleven rockets fired from Lebanon struck Safed and an army base in northern Israel, killing an Israeli soldier and injuring eight others. Israel responded with widespread airstrikes against targets belonging to Hezbollah infrastructure in Jabal al-Braij, Kfar Houneh, Kafr Dunin, Aadchit and Souaneh, killing a total of ten people. In Nabatieh, an attack on a residential building killed seven members of a family, including a child. Another attack in the town of al-Suwana killed a woman and her two children. The IDF said that it killed a senior commander of the elite Redwan Force unit along with a deputy and another fighter in Nabatieh which was confirmed by Hezbollah the next day. A total of seven Hezbollah members were announced dead from the attacks.

In response to the launch of a UAV toward the Lower Galilee from Lebanese territory on 19 February, Israeli jets targeted Hezbollah militants in Marwahin, two weapons storage facilities near the city of Sidon, and Hezbollah infrastructure in the Meiss El Jabal and al-Adisa areas of Lebanon.

On 21 February, an Israeli airstrike on a residential area of Damascus near a fortified compound used by Syrian security forces killed two civilians. On the same day, an Israeli airstrike on the village of Majdal Zoun killed two more civilians, a mother and her child. In addition, Israeli forces struck a Hezbollah observation post in Ramyeh and shelled an area near Aitaroun with artillery to "remove threats." Later on Israeli jets attacked an observation post in Khaim, a military post in Zibqin—from which a missile was fired at Shlomi—and other Hezbollah infrastructure.

On 22 February, after a projectile from Lebanon hit a home in the border town of Yuval, an Israeli drone struck an apartment building in Kfar Remen, killing at least two Hezbollah fighters and wounding three others. The next day, on 23 February, an Israeli strike on a Hezbollah-linked clinic in Blida killed two civilian paramedics and one Hezbollah fighter and injured an unknown number of people.

On 24 February, sirens sounded in Arab el Aramsha, Hanita, Shebaa Farms, and Kiryat Shmona in northern Israel and the Golan Heights due to rocket fire. In response, the IDF struck numerous sites across the areas of Rab El Thalathine, Ayta ash Shab, and Blida. Later an Israeli drone identified a Hezbollah cell entering a military compound in southern Lebanon, leading to an Israeli airstrike on the compound. After the attack, secondary explosions took place, implying the presence of weapons in the building. In addition, fighter jets attacked a Redwan unit operational headquarters near the village of Baraachit, as well as launch posts in the area of Jabal Blat, while Israeli artillery struck to neutralize a threat in the area of Rachaya Al Foukhar.

On 26 February, after Hezbollah shot down a Hermes 450 drone with a surface-to-air missile, Israel launched its first attacks into eastern Lebanon since the conflict began, targeting Hezbollah air defense sites and killing two Hezbollah members near Baalbek. Hezbollah said it fired 60 Katyusha rockets at an IDF headquarters in response to the attack. The IDF eliminated a commander in Hezbollah's Nasser Unit who was responsible for multiple attacks into Israel while driving in his car in Majadel.

==== March 2024 ====
On 4 March, a Hezbollah anti-tank missile strike on Margaliot resulted in seven injuries as well as the death of an Indian national. The next day, an Israeli airstrike on Hula, in retaliation for the previous day's strike on Margaliot, killed three Lebanese citizens, a married couple and their child. Amongst the three killed, Hezbollah announced two as their members. On 9 March, five people, including three Hezbollah members, were killed and at least nine others were wounded in an IDF strike on a house in Khirbet Selm. In retaliation, the next day Hezbollah fired 37 Katyusha rockets at the Mount Meron in northern Israel; no injuries were reported.

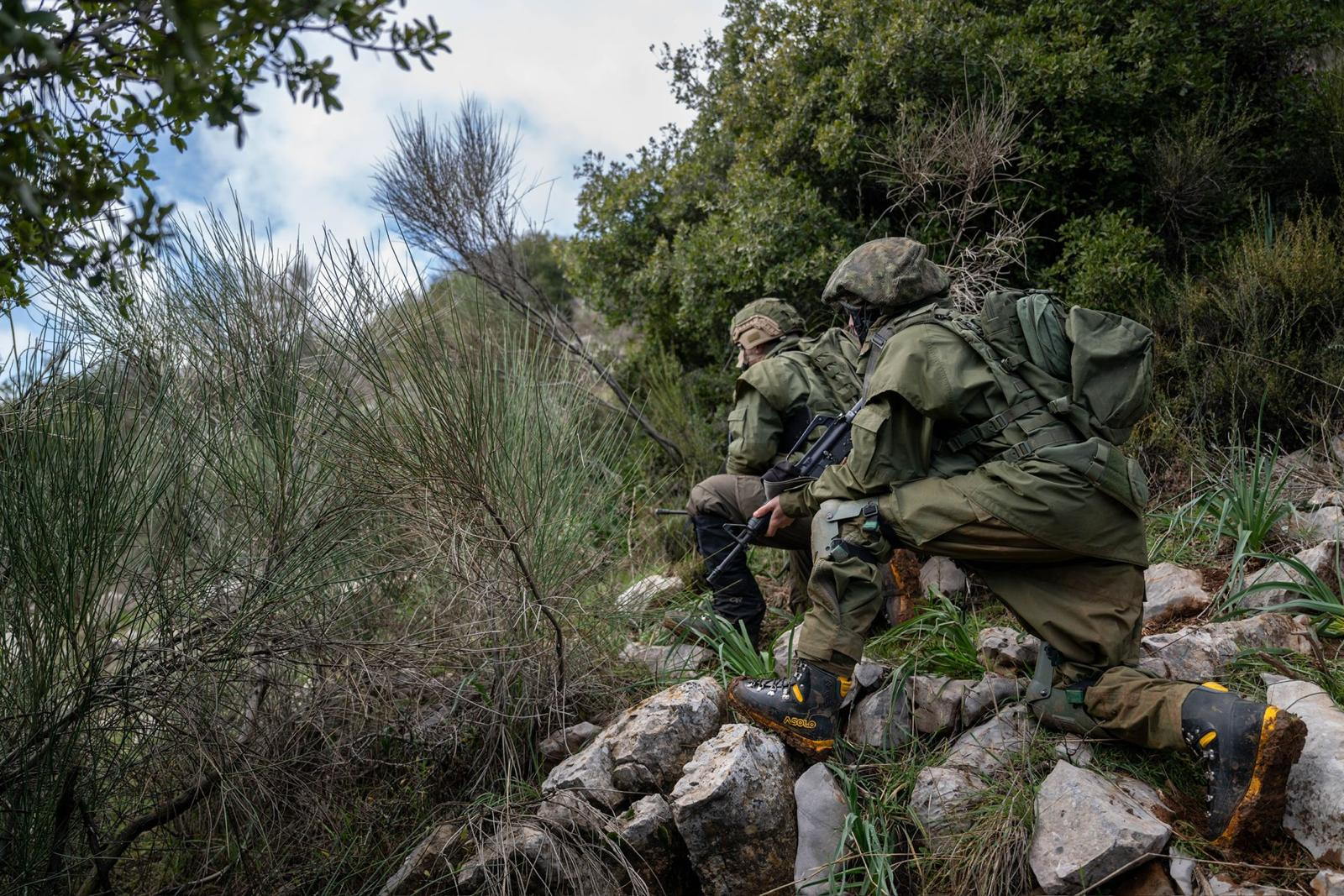
IDF soldiers training as part of the newly formed Mountain Brigade in northern Israel

On 12 March, Israeli airstrikes on the town of al-Nabi Shayth in the Beqaa Valley resulted in six injuries and the death of two Hezbollah members. On 13 March, an Israeli airstrike on a road near Lebanon's Rashidieh refugee camp for Palestinians killed a civilian and Hadi Ali Mustafa, the leader of Hamas forces in Lebanon, and injured two others. A week later, two Syrian teenagers (aged 16 and 17) were handed over to Lebanese authorities for allegedly spying for Israel. It was reported that they confessed to have been given an equivalent of US$11 each by a local mosque servant to unknowingly plant a tracking device in Mustafa's car.

On 27 March, the IDF reported that its airstrike on a paramedic center affiliated with the group in Hebbariye killed seven people, whom were reportedly militants. The report was denied by Hezbollah, which said that the casualties were actually rescuers. The victims were later identified as volunteers, and Lebanon's Ministry of Public Health condemned the strike. In response to the attack, Hezbollah launched around thirty rockets towards northern Israel, killing a factory worker in Kiryat Shmona and lightly wounding another. After sunset, Israeli airstrikes were reported in Tayr Harfa and Naqoura, which each killed five and four people respectively. The strikes killed three paramedics; two from the Islamic Health Society and another from the Amal Movement-affiliated Islamic Risala Scout Association. A local commander of the Amal Movement was also killed, along with at least two Hezbollah members.

On 29 March, an Israeli airstrike targeting Aleppo International Airport killed 38 Syrian soldiers, seven Hezbollah fighters and seven militiamen, in what became the deadliest Israeli strike on Syria in the past three years. Another airstrike in Bazouriyeh, Lebanon killed Ali Abed Akhsan Naim, the deputy commander of Hezbollah's rocket and missiles unit who the IDF said was responsible for planning attacks against Israeli civilians. On 30 March, Reuters reported that an Israeli strike had injured three UN observers and a translator who were monitoring hostilities along the Blue Line. An investigation by the Lebanese Army determined that the explosion was caused by a landmine, which Israel said was planted by Hezbollah. The IDF struck a centre of the Lebanese Ambulance Association at the end of March killing seven paramedics.

=== Initial Iranian involvement (April – July 2024) ===
On 1 April, an Israeli airstrike targeted an Iranian consulate annex building adjacent to the Iranian embassy in Damascus, Syria. It killed eight people, including a senior Quds Force commander of the IRGC, Brigadier General Mohammad Reza Zahedi. The others fatalities included five members of the Islamic Revolutionary Guards Corps and two Iranian advisors. On 8 April, Israeli officials confirmed that Hezbollah fighters shot down a Hermes 900 drone, the first of its type lost during the conflict. On 13 April, the Islamic Revolutionary Guards Corps (IRGC), a branch of the Iranian military, in collaboration with the Popular Mobilization Forces in Iraq, Hezbollah, and the Houthis in Yemen, launched attacks against Israel with drones, cruise missiles, and ballistic missiles.

On 16 April, an Israeli airstrike on two cars near the town of Ain Ebel, in southern Lebanon, killed two Hezbollah members, including regional commander Ismail Baz, and one civilian. The next day, fourteen Israeli soldiers and four civilians were wounded by drones attack in northern Israel. One IDF officer died of his wounds later that week. On 23 April, an Israeli drone strike deep into Lebanon killed an engineer working for Hezbollah's air defense forces as he was traveling in a vehicle. The strike hit the Abu al-Aswad area near the coastal city of Tyre, some 35 kilometers (22 miles) from the border. The fighter's vehicle was completely burnt out. The IDF said it had killed "two significant terrorists in Hezbollah's aerial unit", the second being a senior member of the elite Redwan Force, Muhammad Attiya. In response to the attacks, Hezbollah made its deepest incursion into Israeli territory at the time by launching drone attacks into the city of Acre targeting two IDF bases.

On 5 May, an Israel airstrike on a house in the Lebanese village of Meiss Ej Jabal killed four civilians. In retaliation, Hezbollah fired dozens of rockets at the Israeli town of Kiryat Shmona. On 6 May, two reservist Israeli soldiers of the 98th Paratroopers Division's 655th Battalion were killed by a Hezbollah drone attack near Metula, northern Israel, bringing the IDF death toll to 18. Hezbollah also launched 30 rockets at the Golan Heights, damaging houses in Kidmat Tzvi. The IDF struck 15 Radwan targets in al-Lwaiza, southern Lebanon, and a Hezbollah compound in Sefri, near Baalbek. Lebanese media said that the strike destroyed a factory and injured three people.

On 8 May, Israeli airstrikes in southern Lebanon killed two Hezbollah and three PIJ members. The next day an Israeli airstrike on a car near the village of Bafliyeh killed four Hezbollah members. On 10 May, Israeli airstrikes on two villages in the Marjeyoun District killed a Hezbollah member in Aedsheet and a PIJ member in Blida, respectively. On the same day, another Israeli airstrike on the town of Tayr Harfa killed two civilians who were carrying out repairs on a local cell tower.

On 14 May, an Israeli airstrike on a house in the village of Meiss Ej Jabal killed a member of Hezbollah and injured one other person. Following this, a Hezbollah anti-tank missile strike killed an Israeli civilian and wounded five IDF personnel in the kibbutz of Adamit. At night, an Israeli drone strike on a car in Tyre killed two people including Hussein Makki, a Hezbollah field commander. In response to the commander's killing, Hezbollah fired 60 rockets at Mount Meron air traffic control base causing minor damage. They also fired at least one heavy rocket towards the Biranit army base. One IDF soldier was killed and another five were wounded.

On 15 May, a rocket launched by the Lebanese branch of Hamas fell short of the intended Israeli target, instead landing on the Lebanese side of the border, killing a Syrian immigrant and wounding four others. A Hezbollah drone crashed in the Lower Galilee for the first time since the start of the conflict. Hezbollah said it launched several drones targeting a surveillance system at an army base near Golani Junction, west of Tiberias. The IDF confirmed that two drones were fired at the Tal Shamayim base, with one being intercepted and the other damaging the Sky Dew aerostat. Later that day, an Israeli airstrike on a car near Tyre killed one Hezbollah member and wounded two other people. The next day, two other Hezbollah members were in another airstrike on another car near in the same area. In retaliation, Hezbollah launched a drone strike on Israeli positions in Metula, wounding three IDF soldiers.

On 21 May, an Israeli airstrike near Tyre killed a high-ranking officer in Hezbollah's coastal missile unit. That night, an Israeli airstrike on a car in the Beqaa Valley killed two members of the Islamic Group. Targeted assassinations continued the same week with an Israeli airstrike on a car in the village of Kfar Dajjal which killed a Hezbollah member and seriously wounded three children in a nearby school bus. In response, Lebanon issued a formal complaint to the United Nations Security Council.

On 25 May, an Israeli airstrike on a truck near the Syrian town of al-Qusayr killed two Hezbollah members. Later that day, a car bombing in Damascus killed a Syrian Army officer with ties to Hezbollah. On 26 May, an Israeli airstrike on a house in Aitaroun killed two Hezbollah members. On the same day, another Hezbollah member was killed, as was another person, following an airstrike on a motorcycle in Naqoura. Later, an airstrike on another motorcycle in Ayta ash Shab killed two civilians. An airstrike on a third motorcycle, in Hula, killed two Hezbollah members and wounded two other people. Two civilians were killed in strikes on the village of Yaroun.

On 1 June, an Israeli airstrike on a house in Aadloun killed a civilian and wounded four others. Later that evening, two Israeli airstrikes on a house in Ain Qana killed a Hezbollah member and wounded another person. The next day, an Israeli airstrike on a motorcycle in Hula killed two civilians. On 3 June, a pair of Israeli airstrikes on Naqoura killed two Hezbollah members. Another airstrike, this time on a car near the village of Kauthariyet El Rez, killed another Hezbollah member. In Syria, an Israeli airstrike on a copper plant near Aleppo killed 16 members of Iran-backed militias. Hezbollah said that it fired drones at the IDF's headquarters in the Galilee. It also claimed a drone attack in Metula. The IDF confirmed that two drones crashed in northern Israel while a third was intercepted. Acting Minister of Foreign Affairs of Iran made his first overseas visit as foreign minister to Lebanon, during which he confirmed that the Iranian government was engaged in negotiations with the United States hosted by Oman. Forest fires in northern Israel were erupted the entire week which reportedly resulted in 2,500 acres of land burnt and the hospitalization of six Israeli soldiers and five civilians due to smoke inhalation.

On 11 June, an Israeli strike on a command and control center in Jwaya killed senior Hezbollah commander Taleb Abdallah and three other militants. The next day, in response to Taleb's killing, Hezbollah launched a barrage of about 90 rockets into Israel targeting an IDF factory, military headquarters in Ein Zeitim and Ami'ad, and an air surveillance station in Meron. It later fired another 70 at the Mount Meron area, and then ten more at Zar'it, bringing the total number of launches to 170. It increased to 215 by the late afternoon. On 13 June, Hezbollah fired 150 rockets and 30 UAVs at 15 targets in northern Israel and the Golan Heights.

Amos Hochstein, a senior advisor to US President Joe Biden, arrived in Israel on 17 June to attempt to de-escalate tensions between Israel and Lebanese militias. On 19 June, Nasrallah stated that a Hezbollah invasion of the Galilee "remains on the table" and alleged that the government of Cyprus was allowing Israeli forces to operate within its country and thus made Cyprus a legitimate target for Hezbollah strikes. Cypriot president Nikos Christodoulides denied that Cyprus was taking sides in the conflict. On 30 June, Israeli officials reported 18 IDF soldiers were wounded by a drone attack on the Golan Heights. The inability of Israelis to return to settlements and homes in the north of the country led to Antony Blinken stating that Israel had effectively "lost sovereignty in the northern quadrant of its country".

On 3 July, senior Hezbollah field commander Mohammed Nasser was killed in an Israeli airstrike in Tyre, and in response Hezbollah fired 100 rockets at IDF positions. The following day, it fired 200 more rockets into Israel. On 9 July, an Israeli airstrike on the Beirut–Damascus highway in Syria killed two Hezbollah members, and Hezbollah fired 40 rockets at the Golan Heights. A week later, at least two people were wounded in an Israeli drone attack in Lebanon, and Hezbollah rocket strikes in Kiryat Shmona damaged residential buildings. On 22 July, drones from Lebanon were intercepted by Israeli forces, and a Hezbollah rocket strike injured two soldiers in northern Israel. The following day and in response, Israel launched artillery strikes on southern Lebanon, Hezbollah launched rocket strikes in northern Israel, and Israeli warplanes and artillery struck southern Lebanon.

=== Further airstrikes (July – September 2024) ===
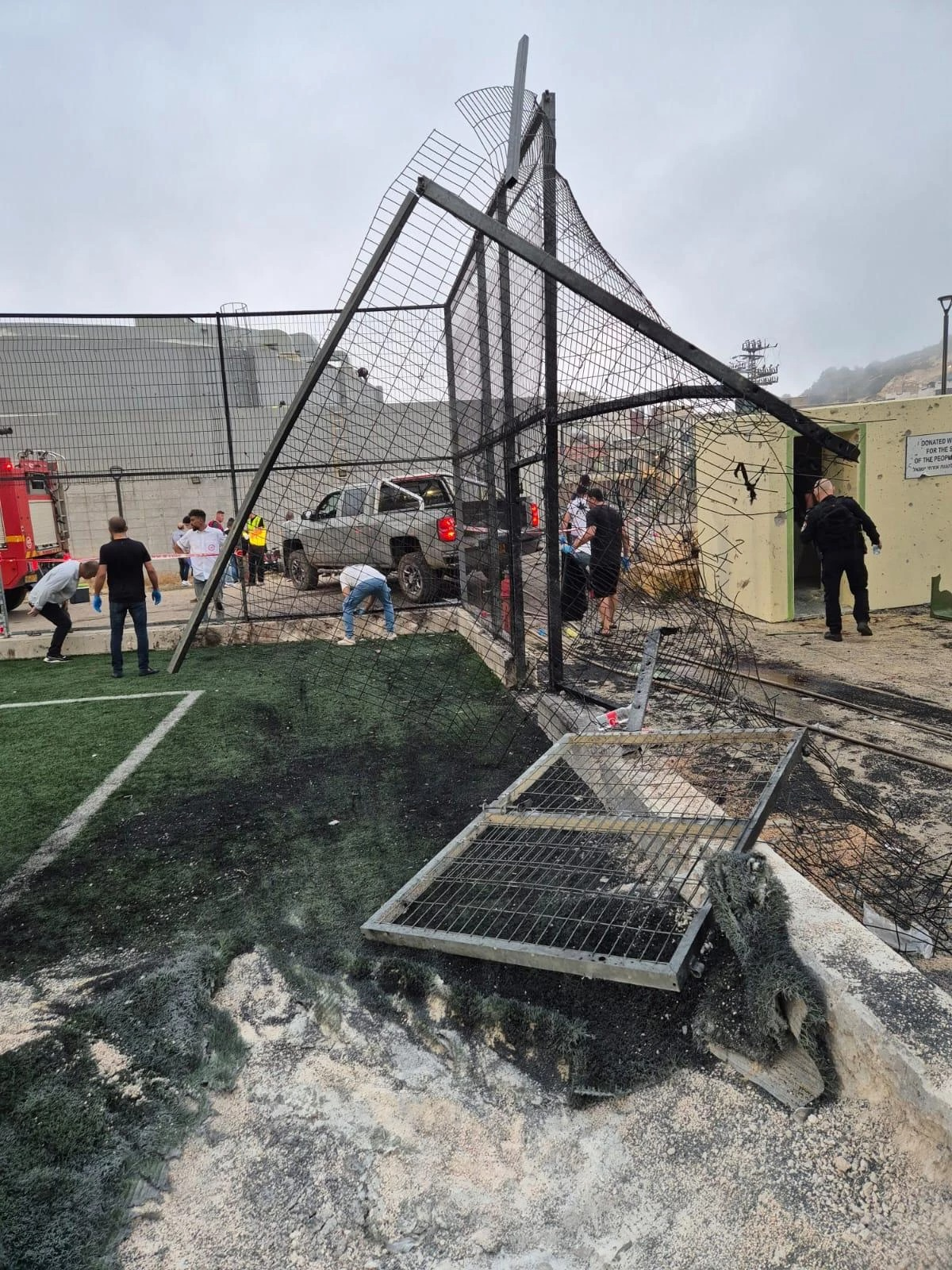
The missile impact site on the soccer field of Majdal Shams, after the bodies of the deceased and wounded were removed

On 27 July, an Israeli strike in southern Lebanon killed four members of different militant groups. A rocket strike hit the Druze town of Majdal Shams in the northern Golan Heights, killing 12 children and injuring dozens more. In retaliation, the IDF bombed villages and towns in south and east Lebanon the following day. On 29 July, two were killed in an Israeli strike in Lebanon. The next day, an Israeli airstrike struck Hezbollah infrastructure in southern Lebanon, and one Israeli civilian was killed in a rocket strike from Lebanon to northern Israel. Hezbollah said it fired at Israeli warplanes which entered Lebanese airspace. The IDF said the airstrike targeted senior commander of Hezbollah Fuad Shukr for his involvement in the Majdal Shams attack, and Hezbollah later confirmed his death. Four civilians were also killed, while 80 people were injured.

On 17 August, at least 11 including a woman and her two children were killed and four were wounded including two serious injuries in an Israeli strike on a metal warehouse in Nabatieh. The IDF claimed that it struck a Hezbollah "weapons storage facility". The Embassy of the Philippines, Beirut advised its 11,000 citizens in Lebanon to leave the country following the strike. A Hezbollah drone strike injured two soldiers in an IDF site near Misgav Am. One was killed in an Israeli drone strike on a motorcycle in Tyre. The IDF confirmed the death of a commander of the elite Redwan Force.

Israeli airstrikes on 25 August

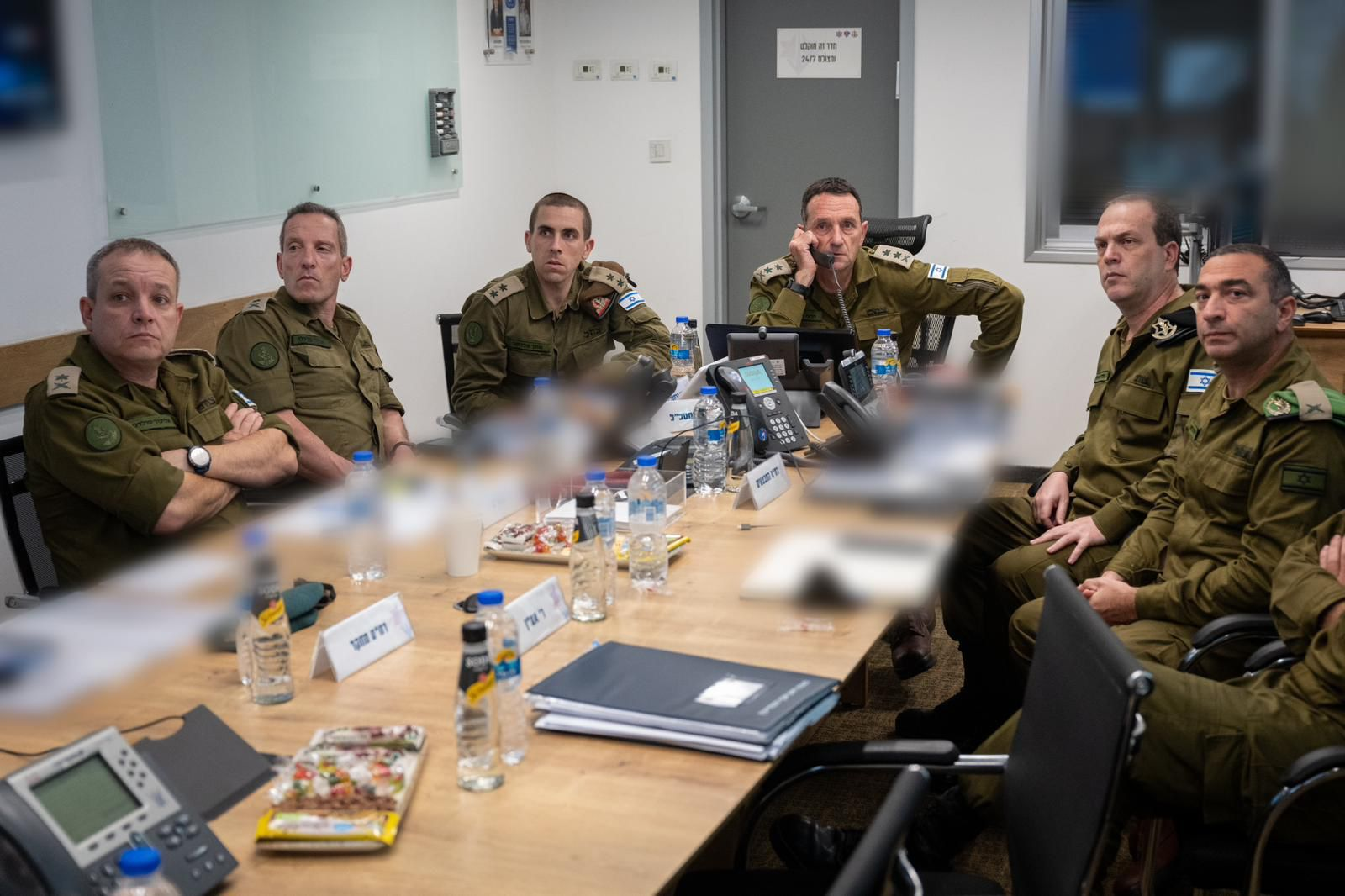
Israeli Defence Forces officials during the 25 August strikes

On 25 August, Israel began strikes in southern Lebanon against Hezbollah targets. Israel framed its strikes as "preemptive". Hezbollah said that it fired over 320 Katyusha rockets to IDF sites in northern Israel and the Golan Heights as the first phase of response to the assassination of Fuad Shukr. A woman was slightly injured due to sharpnel from the attack in Acre. Some homes were also damaged in Northern Israel. Israel sent a hundred fighter jets during its operations. Israeli Defense Minister Yoav Gallant described the strikes as "very successful", stating that "over fifty percent, maybe two-thirds" of Hezbollah's strikes were prevented. An Israeli drone strike in Qasimia in southern Lebanon wounded two people including one Hezbollah militant.

Israel airstrikes struck Khiam, Zebqin, Yater, Shebaa, Nabatieh, Bir Kalb, Kfar Kila, Aalma ech Chaab, and Mays al-Jabal, killing a Hezbollah militant and a Amal Movement militant. Another three people were wounded, namely a Hezbollah militant and a Syrian national. An Israeli Navy officer was killed by a malfunctioning missile launched by the Iron Dome on a Dvora-class fast patrol boat off the coast of Nahariya, northern Israel and two others were injured. An Israel drone strike struck Zawtar El Charkiyeh. The Amal movement said one of its fighters from Khiam was killed. Hezbollah confirmed the death of six militants. Departures and arrivals were canceled at Ben Gurion Airport until 10 a.m.; two El Al flights were diverted. The Golan Regional Council instructed residents of the Golan Heights to remain in their shelters. Yoav Gallant declared an "emergency situation" for two days. Representatives of the United States were monitoring the situation.

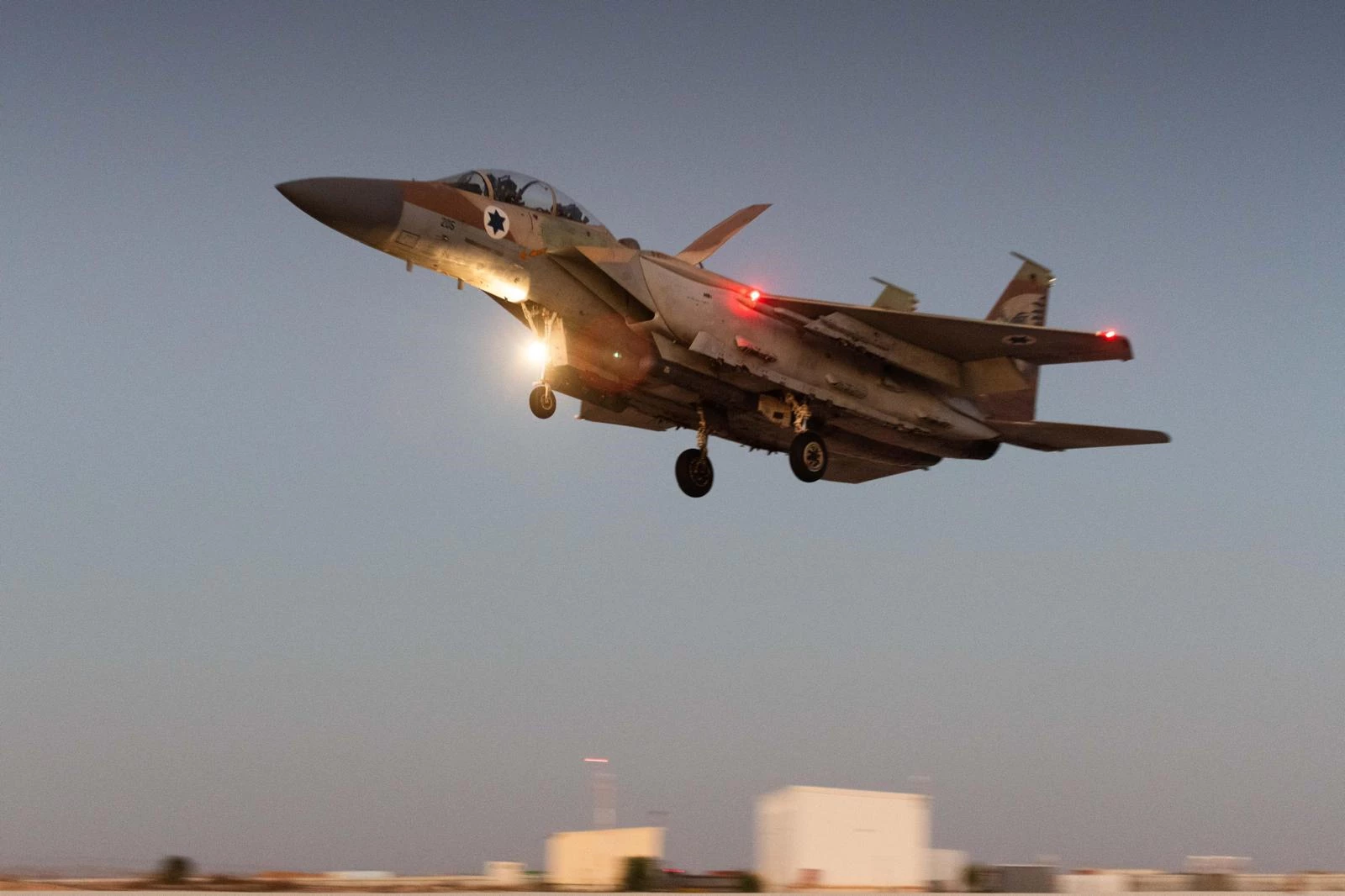
F-15I fighter used to attack targets in Lebanon on 27 September 2024

On 8 September, special forces from the Shaldag Unit raided and destroyed an Iranian rocket manufacturing facility beneath a branch of the Syrian Scientific Studies and Research Center in Masyaf, which was used to supply Hezbollah with precision rockets. On 16 September, the Security Cabinet of Israel approved a new war aim of returning evacuated residents to the north of Israel, adding to the goals of destroying Hamas and liberating the hostages.

=== Escalation (September – November 2024) ===
==== September attacks ====
On 17 September, at least 12 people were killed and more than 2,750 were wounded, including Hezbollah members and civilians, after the explosions of their pagers in Lebanon and Syria, including in Beirut. The attack resulted in 1,500 fighters being taken out of action, with many facing blindness or losing their hands. Among those injured was the Iranian ambassador, Mojtaba Amani. Several drones launched from Lebanon crossed the border. Hezbollah confirmed the death of 12 militants on that day. Also on 17 September, the Shin Bet claimed that it thwarted a Hezbollah attempt for assassinate a former senior defence official with a Claymore mine.

On 18 September another series of explosions involving wireless devices was reported across Lebanon, killing at least 30 people and injuring 750 others. Hezbollah said that it carried out four strikes targeting IDF sites including in Neve Ziv and Beit Hillel with rockets and artillery. Lebanese media reported that Israeli strikes struck Al-Jbeen, Shama, Majdal Zoun, Kfar Kila, Kfar Shiuba, Houla, al-Taybeh, the forest in the vicinity of Kounine and Beit Yahoun, and the outskirts of Yater. The IDF said that it struck Hezbollah sites in Chihine, Tayibe, Blida, Meiss El Jabal, Aitaroun and Kfarkela and a Hezbollah weapons depot in Khiam in these airstrikes.

On 19 September, the IDF said that it started carrying out airstrikes against Hezbollah to destroy its capabilities in southern Lebanon while heavy bombing was reported in Deir Qanoun En Nahr. The IDF also said that it killed two Lebanese militants attempting to infiltrate the border and plant an explosive at an IDF post. Two Israeli soldiers were killed and nine others were injured in Hezbollah attacks in the vicinity of the Lebanese border. Three rockets launched by Hezbollah to Metula caused fires and damaged electric infrastructure. The IDF said that its jets struck more than a hundred Hezbollah rocket launchers and other Hezbollah sites in its heaviest air strikes since the Israel–Hezbollah conflict started in October 2023. An Israeli strike in al-Haniyeh wounded four people. The Lebanese National News Agency reported that Israeli airstrikes targeted Mahmoudieh, Ksar al-Aroush, and Birket Jabbour.

On 20 September, an Israeli strike in the Dahieh suburb of Beirut killed Ibrahim Aqil, the acting commander of the elite Redwan Force and other personnel including Ahmad Mahmoud Wahabi, a senior commander of Hezbollah while they were in a meeting. At least 45 people were killed including Aqil, Wahabi, another 14 high-ranking Hezbollah militants, three children, and seven women, while 68 people were injured. Heavy rocket fire was reported afterward in northern Israel. Hezbollah claimed that its Katyusha rockets struck the IDF base in Meron. Hezbollah also said that it targeted Israeli airbases, intelligence bases, and a tank.

On 21 September, the IDF claimed to have "almost completely dismantled" Hezbollah's military chain of command. The IDF claimed that it destroyed thousands of rocket launchers. Four people were wounded in Israeli strikes. The IAF also launched heavy artillery strikes in several areas in southern Lebanon. The IDF said that it launched 400 strikes targeting Hezbollah rocket launchers and other infrastructure.

On 22 September, Israeli President Isaac Herzog denied any Israeli involvement in the pager explosions. Hezbollah made two attacks on the Israeli Ramat David Airbase using Fadi 1 and Wadi 2 missiles, injuring one person; an additional three people were also injured in Krayot and Lower Galilee. Three people were killed in Israeli strikes in southern Lebanon. Hezbollah confirmed the death of two of its militants. Hezbollah claimed that it struck three Israeli targets.

Hezbollah rockets explode near a highway in Israel on 24 September

On 23 September, the IDF conducted over 1,600 strikes in Lebanon, killing at least 558 people and injuring more than 1,835 others including children, women and paramedics according to the Lebanese Health Ministry. Hezbollah fired about 240 rockets into Israel, the West Bank, and Golan Heights, injuring five people. It first fired 35 rockets into northern Israel targeting IDF bases and warehouses, lightly injuring a man in the Lower Galilee. It later fired around 80 rockets, targeting several locations including Ariel and Karnei Shomron in the occupied West Bank and Haifa. The group targeted IDF bases and Rafael Advanced Defense Systems facilities. Ali Karaki, the commander of Hezbollah's Southern Front, was targeted in an Israeli airstrike in Dahieh. Hezbollah said that he survived the attack. A Hamas field commander was killed in an Israeli airstrike in southern Lebanon.

By 25 September, an army of around 40,000 Iraqi, Syrian, and Houthi militants were concentrated around the Golan Heights, which the Institute for the Study of War argued was to defend against an Israeli invasion of Lebanon. The number of displaced Lebanese people reached an estimated 500,000. On 26 September, an Israeli strike on a three-story building in Younine killed at least 19 Syrians and a Lebanese person, mostly women or children, and injured eight others.

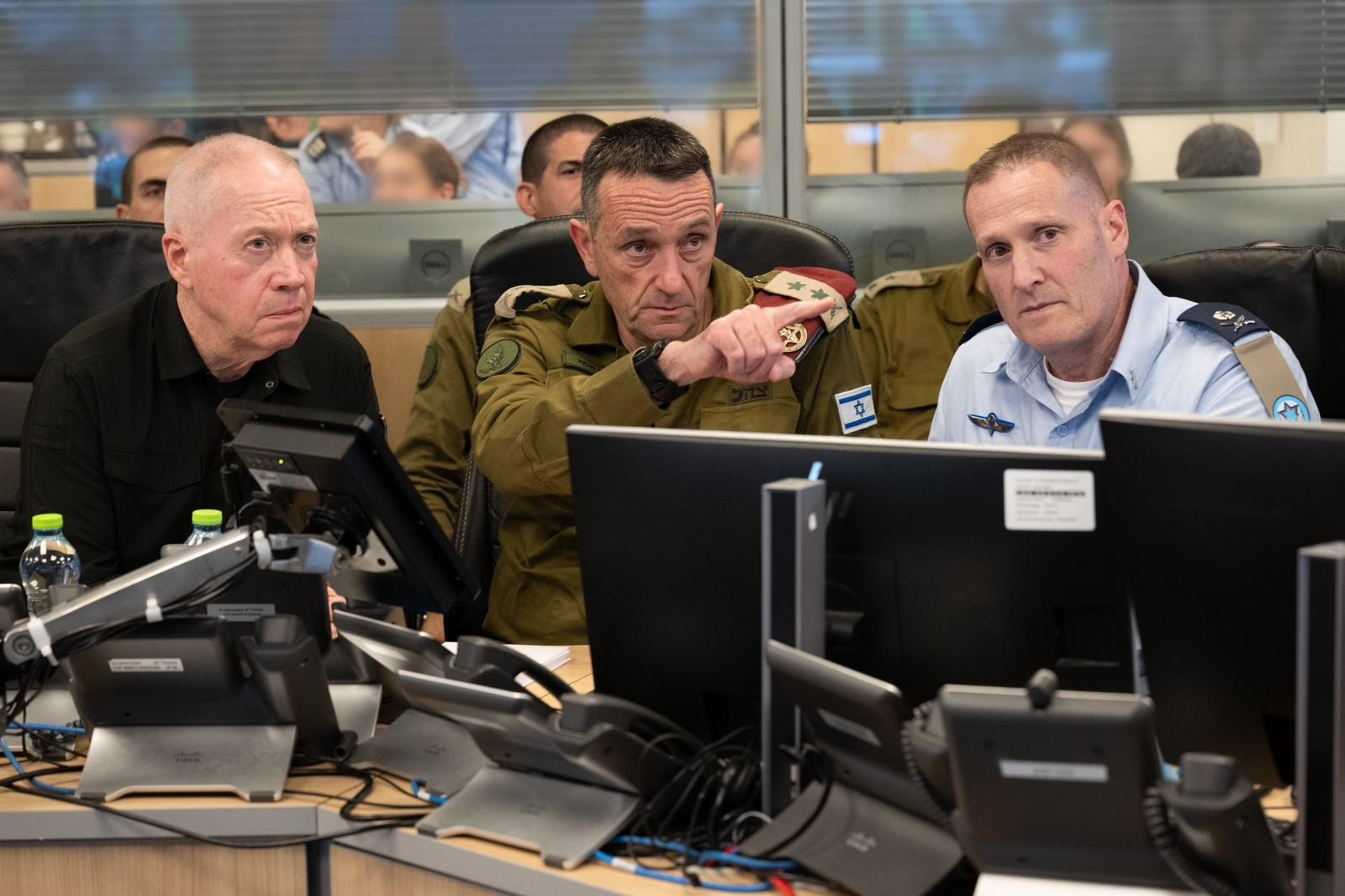
Yoav Galant, Herzi Halevi and Tomer Bar on 28 September 2024

On 27 September, Israel struck Hezbollah's central headquarters in Beirut, targeting Hezbollah leader Hassan Nasrallah. Al-Manar reported that four buildings collapsed in the attack. At least five other people died, including Ali Karaki, Hezbollah's commander of the southern front since 1982, and at least 100 were injured.

On 28 September, the Lebanese National News Agency reported that IDF strikes struck civil defense centres and a medical clinic in Taybeh and Deir Siriane killing 11 medical staff and injuring 10 others. On 29 September, an Israeli air strike on a home in Dahr-al-Ain killed at least 11 people. The Lebanese National News Agency reported that at least 17 members of a family were killed and several others were trapped under rubble in an Israeli air strike in Zboud. An Israeli strike in Ain El Delb killed 45 people and injured at least 75 others. An Israeli strike in Bekaa killed 12 people and injured 20 others.

On 30 September, Israel informed the United States that it intended to carry out a ground maneuver in Lebanon aimed at clearing Hezbollah's infrastructure along the border. That evening, the Lebanese Armed Forces (LAF) and UNIFIL withdrew from the Israeli-Lebanese border to the north to a distance of 5 kilometres (3.1 mi; 2.7 nmi) from the border, while the IDF designated the settlements of Metula, Misgav Am and Kfar Giladi as closed military areas. Israeli troops amassed on the border in southern Lebanon, with Israel stating that they were preparing for a limited ground invasion.

==== Israeli invasion of Lebanon ====
On 1 October, the Israeli military began an invasion of southern Lebanon, also known as the Third Lebanon War by some Israeli sources, and announced that Israel had been carrying out small covert raids into Lebanon for months. The IDF announced that it had launched "limited, localized and targeted raids" against targets with strategic importance to Hezbollah. An Israeli strike on a house in Al-Dawoudiya killed at least 10 people and injured five others. Hours after the initial Israeli raids began, Iran launched ballistic missiles against Israel, citing "terrorist acts of the Zionist regime" such as the assassination of Hassan Nasrallah as justification for the attack.

On 3 October, six days after Nasrallah's assassination, his successor, Hashem Safieddine, was also assassinated during an Israeli airstrike in Beirut. Israel kept the extent of its campaign vague. On 29 October, IDF officers said that while some Lebanese villages still pose a threat to Israel, most military goals in Lebanon border area were fulfilled and conditions were created to cement Israel's achievements in ceasefire negotiations.

On 26 November, hours after IDF troops reached the Litani River, Prime Minister of Israel Benjamin Netanyahu announced the transfer of a sixty-day ceasefire deal to the Security Cabinet of Israel. Support for the deal in the Israeli government was "unanimous". The deal involved Hezbollah operatives withdrawing to the north of the Litani River, and Israel withdrawing from Lebanon at the end of the sixty days. The deal also stated that Israel would retain "complete military freedom of action" to attack Lebanon in the event of a violation of the agreement by Hezbollah or another entity in Lebanon. Prime Minister of Lebanon Najib Mikati issued strong support for the agreement and urged the international community to help implement the agreement immediately in order to "halt Israeli aggression". On 27 November, thousands of displaced Lebanese began to return to areas ruined by Israeli strikes.

=== Ceasefire violations (November 2024 – March 2026) ===
On 3 December, Hezbollah fired two projectiles at the Shebaa Farms in what it described as a "defensive and warning response", accusing Israel of committing repeated ceasefire violations. In response, the IDF conducted a wave of strikes in southern Lebanon, killing nine people. Two people, including a Lebanese security services corporal, were killed by Israeli strikes earlier that day. On 9 December, four reservists of the 35th Paratroopers Brigade were killed in an accident when unmarked munitions exploded in a tunnel in the Labbouneh area, which detonated Hezbollah weaponry, leading to the tunnel's collapse. The IDF withdrew from Al-Khiyam on 12 December in accordance with the ceasefire. On 26 January 2025, a day before the ceasefire's deadline, Israeli forces fired at Lebanese residents en route to communities near the border, killing 22 people and injuring 124. After the ceasefire's initial deadline passed on 27 January, Israeli troops refused to withdraw from southern Lebanon, accusing the Lebanese government of not upholding the deal. The ceasefire was extended to 18 February.

On 13 February, the IDF accused Iran's Quds Force of smuggling cash onto civilian flights en route to Beirut–Rafic Hariri International Airport to fund Hezbollah. In response, Lebanon blocked an Iranian passenger plane from entering its territory. The decision sparked protests from Hezbollah supporters, who blocked access to the airport, and on 15 February, attacked a UNIFIL convoy en route to the airport, injuring deputy force commander Chok Bahadur Dhakal. On 17 February, an Israeli drone strike hit a car in Sidon, killing Mohammed Shaheen, Hamas's operations chief in Lebanon. On the ceasefire's deadline on 18 February, the IDF withdrew from all of southern Lebanon, apart from five hilltops on the border—namely al-Aziyah, al-Awaida, el-Hamames, Jabal Bilat, and Labbouneh.

On 22 March, six rockets were fired at Metula from southern Lebanon, with three crashing in Lebanon and the rest being intercepted. Hezbollah denied responsibility for the attack. The IDF responded with strikes on dozens of Hezbollah targets across southern Lebanon, including rocket launchers. On 25 March, an Israeli drone strike on a vehicle in Qaaqaait al-Jisr killed Hassan Kamal Halawi, who commanded Hezbollah's anti-tank missile unit in southern Lebanon. On 28 March, two rockets were fired at Kiryat Shmona, with one falling short in Lebanon and the other being intercepted. In response, the IDF said that it struck several Hezbollah targets in southern Lebanon, including command centers. A strike in Kfar Tebnit killed three people and injured 18 others. An airstrike also hit a building in Dahieh that the IDF accused of storing drones from Hezbollah's Unit 127, in the first attack in Beirut since the ceasefire went into effect.

On 1 April, an Israeli airstrike on an apartment in Dahieh killed four people and injured seven others. Among the dead were senior Hezbollah official Hassan Bdeir, who the IDF accused of planning to attack Israeli civilians alongside Hamas, and his son, who was a Hezbollah member. On 5 June, the IDF said that it struck underground facilities in Dahieh that were used by Hezbollah's Unit 127 to produce thousands of drones with funding from Iran. The strikes marked the largest escalation of the conflict since the ceasefire. On 24 October, two people were killed and two others were injured in an Israeli airstrike on a vehicle in Toul, Lebanon. The IDF said that it struck the head of logistics in Hezbollah's Southern Front Abbas Hassan Karaki whose presence in the south of Lebanon violated the ceasefire terms.

On 18 November, an Israeli strike hit a parked car at the Ain al-Hilweh Palestinian refugee camp, killing 13 people. The IDF said it hit a Hamas training camp. On 23 November, an Israeli strike in Haret Hreik killed five people and injured 28 others. Haytham Ali Tabatabai, Hezbollah's chief of staff and second-in-command, was killed in the attack. On the one-year anniversary of the ceasefire, The New York Times characterized the conflict as still ongoing with "near-daily" attacks by Israel into Lebanon. On 20 February 2026, Israeli airstrikes in the Baalbek area killed ten people, including eight Hezbollah members, and injured 24 others. Three of the dead were identified as local Hezbollah commanders. A separate strike that day in Ain al-Hilweh killed two people, which the IDF said hit a Hamas command center. On 21 February, Arab media reported that IRGC officers took responsibility for supervising Hezbollah's activities, increasing its military preparedness in anticipation of an Israeli or American attack amid the Iran–United States crisis.

=== 2026 Lebanon war (March 2026 – present) ===
On 2 March, Hezbollah fired several rockets at northern Israel, setting off sirens in Haifa and the Upper Galilee. The group said its actions were in response to the assassination of Iranian supreme leader Ali Khamenei. One of the rockets was intercepted, while several others hit open areas. Hezbollah later claimed that the attack was a "defensive act" after over a year of Israeli attacks despite a truce. It added that it restarted fighting to force Israel to stop its aggression and evacuate from seized Lebanese territories, emphasising that the move was unrelated to the Iran war. The IAF and Israeli Navy conducted extensive retaliatory strikes across Lebanon, mainly targeting Dahieh and southern Lebanon. The IDF said it struck over 70 targets, while issuing evacuation orders for over 50 villages in the south and east. It added that Hussein Meklad, Hezbollah's intelligence chief, was killed. At least 52 people were killed, 154 were injured, and 29,000 others were displaced, according to the Lebanese Health Ministry. In response to Hezbollah's actions, prime minister Nawaf Salam banned the group from conducting military activities.

On 3 March, Israel resumed ground operations in Lebanon and continued conducting strikes. Attacks hit weapons facilities, command centers, and communication equipment, along with the studios of Hezbollah-linked outlets Al-Nour and Al-Manar. The IDF said it struck 160 targets since the escalation and announced that it killed a senior liaison to the IRGC in Beirut the day prior. It separately killed Davoud Alizadeh, the commander of the Quds Force's Lebanon Corps, in Tehran. In the night, Hezbollah fired rockets at Tel Aviv and Haifa. By 4 March, more than 300,000 southern Lebanese residents had been displaced due to the conflict. Israeli strikes hit residential areas in Beirut and eastern Lebanon, killing at least 11 people. Two Israeli soldiers were wounded in Lebanon after Hezbollah claimed to have struck a Merkava tank in Houla. On 6 March, a Hezbollah rocket strike in northern Israel injured eight soldiers, five seriously. Later that night, Israeli commandos raided Al-Nabi Shayth in an attempt to recover the remains of missing pilot Ron Arad, leading to a gunbattle that left three Lebanese soldiers dead. Simultaneous airstrikes in the area killed 41 people and injured 40 more. The Israelis withdrew without finding Arad's body.

On 8 March, two Israeli soldiers were killed in a separate rocket attack in southern Lebanon. The following day, Hezbollah missiles struck a satellite communications center near Beit Shemesh and a daycare in Ramla in central Israel. On 1 April, an Israeli naval strike in Beirut killed Haj Youssef Ismail Hashem, the commander of Hezbollah's Southern Front.

On 8 April, Israeli strikes killed 254 people and wounded more than 1,000 others in central Beirut. Israel Katz said that the strikes targeted hundreds of Hezbollah militants and command centers across Lebanon, in the group's largest blow since the pager attacks. On 16 April, President Trump announced that Israel and Lebanon agreed to a 10-day truce. On 27 April, Hezbollah leader Naim Qassem stated that the group will not revert to the pre-March status and will respond to Israeli attacks. On 15 May, the truce was extended by Israel and Lebanon for another 45 days. On 1 June, Israel agreed not to hit Beirut's southern suburbs, and Hezbollah agreed not to attack Israel as part of a US proposal, with the cease-fire framework to be expanded to include entire Lebanon. On 3 June, Israel and Lebanon agreed to renew the ceasefire, mediated by the US, and plan to establish "pilot zones". On 4 June, Hezbollah rejected the truce deal announced the previous day and instead demanded a comprehensive truce and full withdrawal of Israel from Lebanon.

Israeli forces carried out airstrikes on the Dahieh area in Beirut's southern suburbs on 14 June 2026, targeting what they described as Hezbollah infrastructure in the Dahieh area. The office of the Israeli prime minister said the strikes were in response to rocket fire from Hezbollah toward northern Israel earlier the same day. Lebanese civil defence reported at least three people were killed in the strikes.

According to Axios, U.S. officials said Israel had notified the Trump administration before the operation.

On 19 June, President Trump said that Israel and Hezbollah agreed to a truce mediated by the US, Qatar and Iran.

On 26 June, US Secretary of State Marco Rubio announced a framework deal between Israel and Lebanon that aims to achieve "lasting peace and security" through US mediation. The agreement asks for a cease-fire, with Hezbollah agreeing to terminate all hostilities and withdraw from southern Lebanon. It was later rejected by Hezbollah.

== Impact and aftermath ==
Syrian rebels took advantage of the war, the heavy losses suffered by Hezbollah, and Hezbollah's absence in Syria to launch the 2024 Syrian opposition offensive on 27 November 2024 to overrun Syria's government-held territories. Hezbollah, which had previously sent forces, said they would not deploy troops, but later sent "supervising forces" to unsuccessfully attempt to repel the 2024 Homs offensive, as Homs is a key transport route for Iran to supply Hezbollah. In December 2024, the fall of Assad's Baathist regime in Syria was another blow to its Lebanese ally, Hezbollah, which was already weakened because of Israeli military actions.

Following major operations in 2024, numerous analysts and experts have characterized the outcome as a significant victory for Israel. The Institute for the Study of War reported that Israeli operations effectively degraded Hezbollah's capabilities, leading to a ceasefire agreement on November 26, 2024, which mandated Hezbollah's disarmament in southern Lebanon. Hezbollah failed to accomplish its goal of compelling Israel to cease operations in the Gaza Strip, resulting in a weakened position within the region. Similarly, experts from the Atlantic Council noted that Israel's military actions, including the elimination of Hezbollah's leader, Hassan Nasrallah, significantly diminished the group's operational effectiveness.

== Casualties and damage ==
=== Lebanon ===
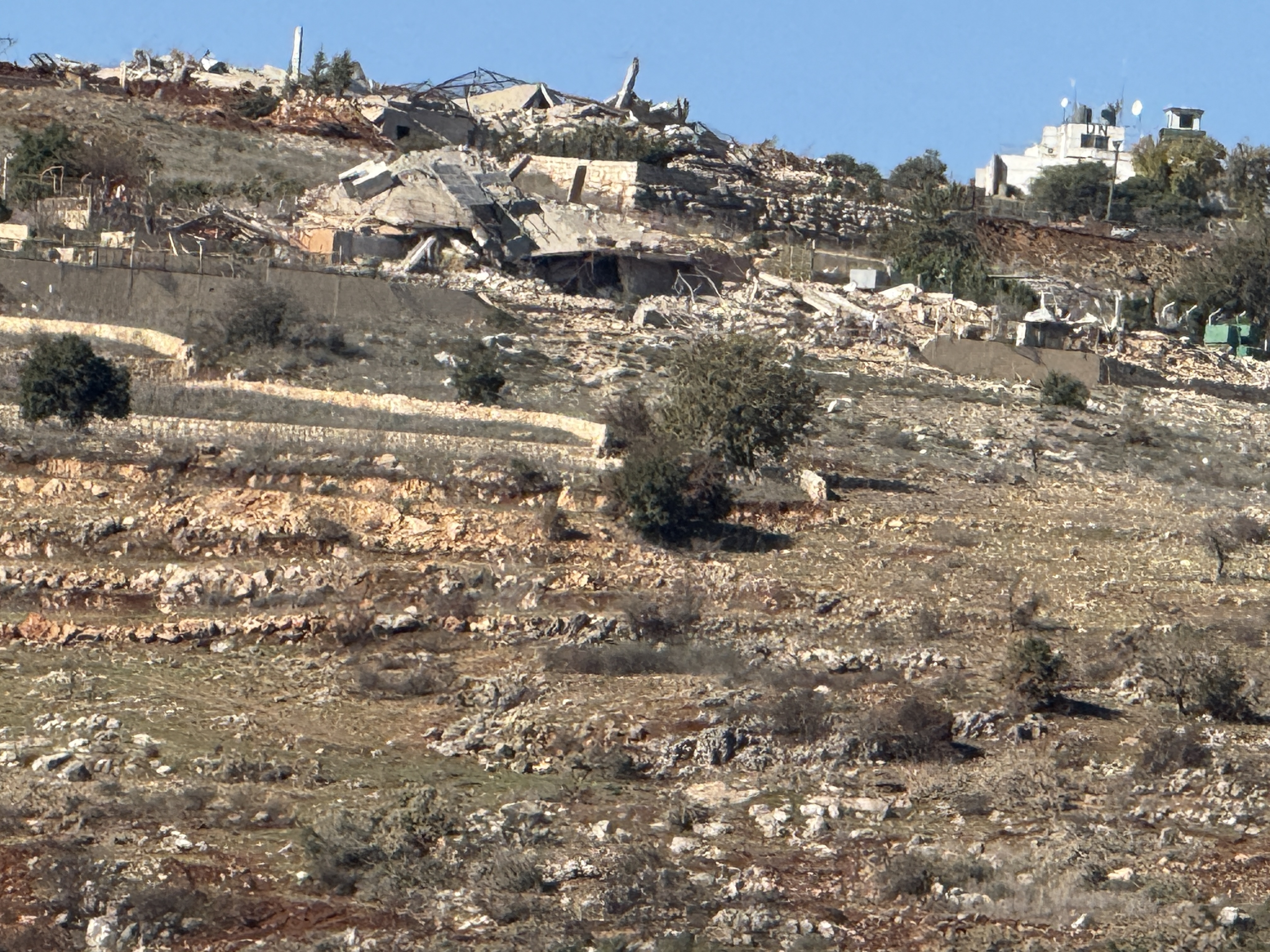
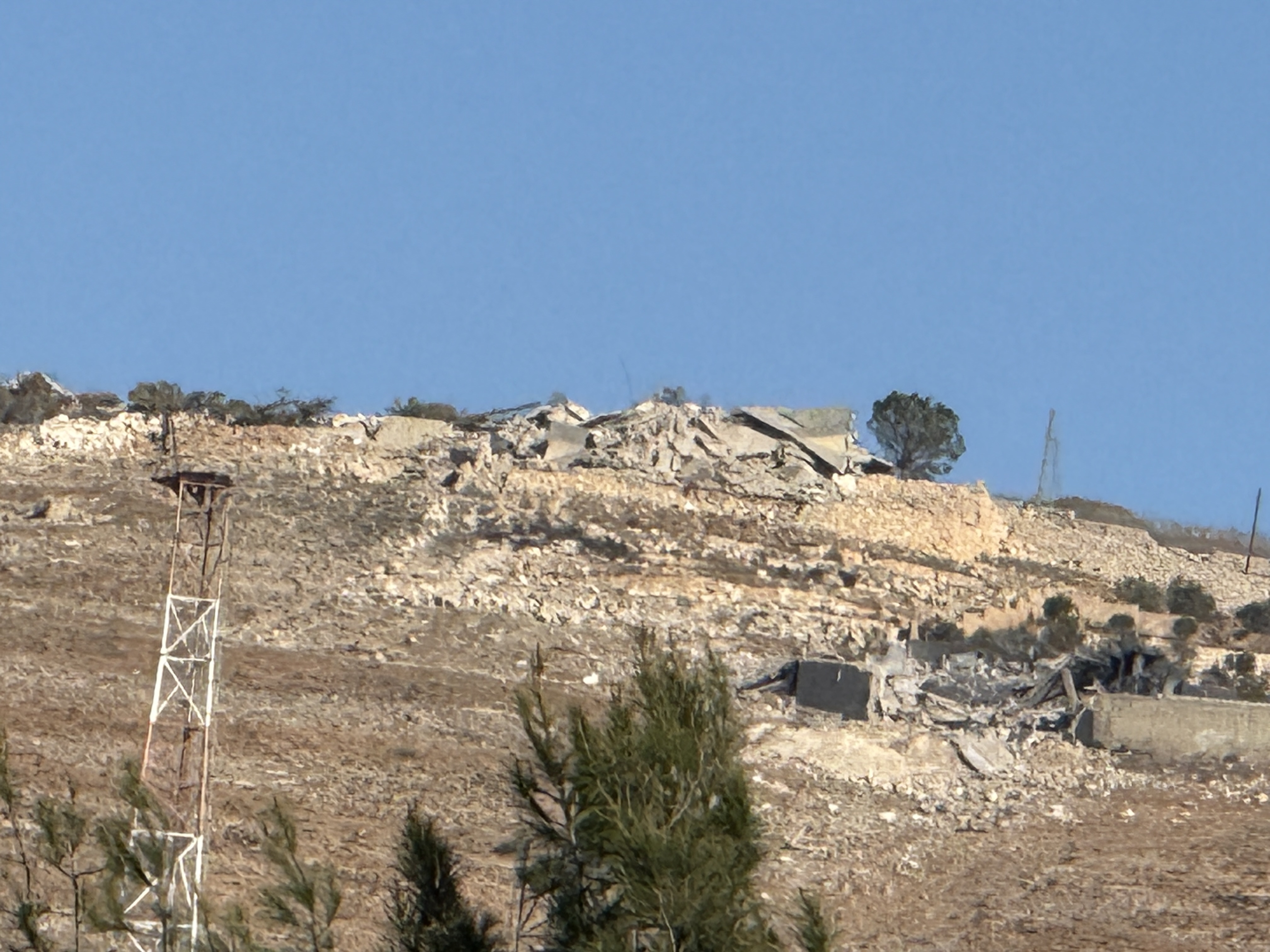
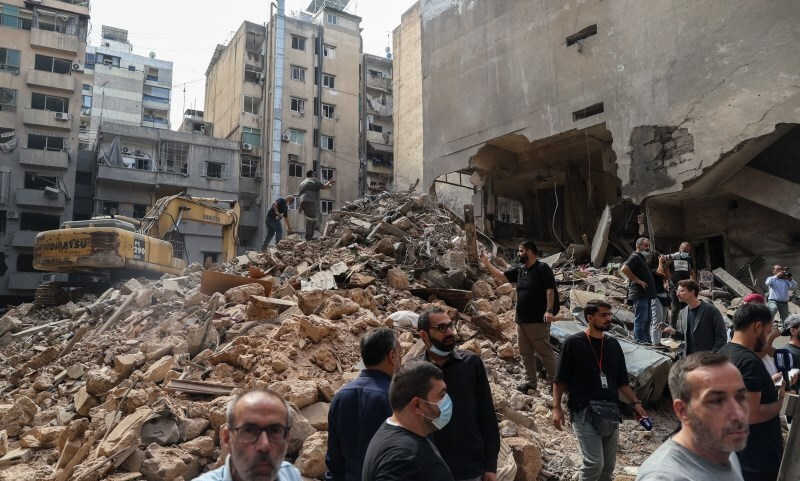
Top, left to right: Destruction in Houla and Maroun al-Ras pictured on 15 December 2024
Bottom: Aftermath of the October 2024 Bachoura airstrike

The olive trade in southern Lebanon, which is the main source of income for many, was halted as farmers stopped their harvests in fear of the active shelling. According to Agriculture Minister Abbas Hajj Hassan, 40,000 olive trees have been burned down by fires caused by IDF shelling. The ministry has also said that 790 hectares of agricultural land have been damaged and 340 thousand farm animals have been lost. In total, the IDF has caused US$3 billion of agriculture losses. The Institute of International Finance predicted that Lebanon's GDP could decline by one percent by the end of 2023 and by 30 percent in 2024 in the event of further spillover of the war. According to the Council for the South, Israeli strikes have destroyed 1,700 buildings and damaged 14,000 others and caused US$500 million worth of damage on water, electricity, telecoms and other infrastructure.

==== Human losses and displacement ====
Phase	Killed	Injured	Additional notes
Early phase and invasion: 8 October 2023 – 26 November 2024	3,823	15,859	At least 80% killed after the escalation in September
Ceasefire: 27 November 2024 – 1 March 2026	397	1,102	
2026 Lebanon war and ceasefire: 2 March 2026 – present	3,980	12,001	
Total	8,200	28,962	

On 4 December 2024, the Lebanese Health Ministry reported that since 7 October 2023, Israeli attacks killed 4,047 people, including 316 children and 790 women, and injured 16,638 others. Among the dead were at least 41 Lebanese Army soldiers and more than 200 medics. Several UNIFIL workers and peacekeepers were injured in numerous attacks by both Israel and Lebanese militias. By 25 November 2025, the Lebanese Health Ministry reported that Israeli attacks during the ceasefire had killed 331 people and injured 945. The UN said that at least 127 fatalities were civilians. At the height of the conflict in October 2024, more than 1.2 million Lebanese were displaced, including between 200,000 and 300,000 who fled into Syria.

==== Infrastructure ====
The conflict resulted in widespread destruction in Lebanon that was particularly seen in the south, east, and Dahieh—the southern suburbs of the capital, Beirut. According to the World Bank, 99,209 houses were damaged during the conflict, of which 18% were destroyed. By 31 October 2024, nearly 25% of the buildings in towns near the border were damaged or destroyed, with the most destruction occurring in Kfar Kila and Ayta ash-Shaab. Roughly 80% of the damage occurred after 2 October. In the areas that the IDF had captured during its ground invasion into Lebanon, 42% of buildings were destroyed, according to NBC News.

Amnesty International reported the damaging or destruction of over 10,000 buildings between October 2024 and January 2025, with 70% of the buildings in Yaroun, Dhayra, and Al-Bustan being severely damaged or destroyed. UN-Habitat reported that 27% of buildings in Marjayoun and 15% of buildings in Bint Jbeil were damaged or destroyed, while the mayor of Kfar Kila stated that 90% of the homes in the village were destroyed during the conflict, with the remaining 10% sustaining damage. The scale of destruction in Dahieh was comparable to the 2006 Lebanon war, with 353 buildings in the area being destroyed and more than 6,000 houses damaged. The Hezbollah-linked newspaper Al Akhbar reported that the cost of damages in Dahieh was $630 million.

More than 60 schools have been destroyed since September 2024, according to Save the Children. The Lebanese Health Ministry said that Israeli strikes damaged 68 hospitals, 63 primary healthcare facilities, and 177 ambulances. The World Health Organization reported that 47% of the attacks on health facilities resulted in fatalities. According to the United Nations Development Programme, Israeli attacks in the districts of Nabatieh, Bint Jbiel, Tyre, Baalbek, and Baabda damaged 48% of businesses, 36 health facilities, 40 water facilities, 18 telecommunication facilities, 36 public electricity facilities, and 83 educational institutions.

==== Economy ====
According to the World Bank's Lebanon Rapid Damage and Needs Assessment (RDNA) 2025 report, the conflict cost Lebanon a total of US$14 billion. Physical damages amounted to $6.8 billion, while decreased productivity, lost revenue, and operational costs amounted to $7.2 billion. With $4.6 billion in damages, the housing sector suffered the most losses, followed by the commerce, industry, and tourism sector with losses of $3.4 billion. The conflict caused Lebanon's real GDP to decline by 7.1% in 2024. The World Bank added that reconstruction costs amounted to $11 billion.

=== Hezbollah ===
Since 8 October 2023, Hezbollah officially announced the names of 521 members killed during the conflict. After Israel's escalation against Hezbollah in September 2024, Hezbollah mostly stopped announcing its casualties. As of December 2024, the IDF estimates that around 3,800 Hezbollah fighters had been killed since 8 October 2023, including 2,672 during the invasion of Lebanon and 44 since the ceasefire. It earlier estimated that at least 7,000 suffered injuries that made them unable to fight. The Institute for National Security Studies of Tel Aviv University put losses at around 2,450. According to a source familiar with Hezbollah's operations, the group possibly lost up to 4,000 members during the conflict—over 10 times its losses during the 2006 Lebanon War.

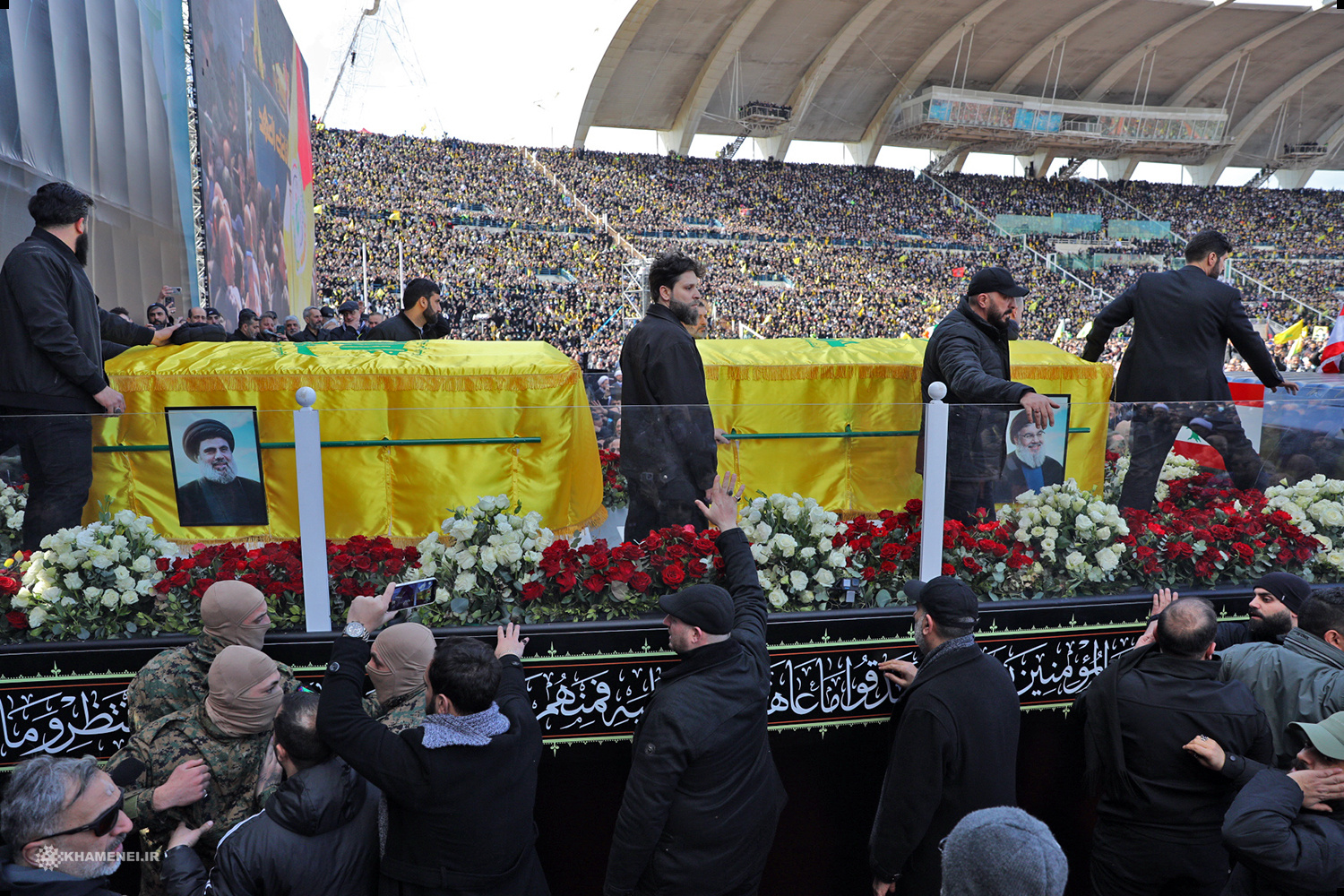
Coffins of senior Hezbollah official Hashem Safieddine and secretary-general Hassan Nasrallah during their funeral on 23 February 2025.

Hezbollah's senior leadership faced the heaviest casualties in its entire history during the conflict. According to the IDF, 13 members of Hezbollah's senior command were killed. Its political council lost figures such as Secretary-General Hassan Nasrallah, who ruled the group for over three decades, and his deputy, Hashem Safieddine. Its armed wing lost key leaders such as Fuad Shukr, Hezbollah's military commander; Ibrahim Aqil, Shukr's deputy; and Ali Karaki, the commander of Hezbollah's Southern Front. Hezbollah also saw heavy damage inflicted upon its equipment, missile arsenal and infrastructure in southern Lebanon, weakening its operational capacity. Heavy damage was inflicted upon military infrastructure such as bases, tunnels, weapon depots, and fortifications, and its arms supply has been disrupted by Israeli strikes on Syrian border crossings. According to IDF, they confiscated over 155,000 weapons and pieces of military equipment belonging to Hezbollah, including around 12,000 explosive devices, drones, and other explosive weapons, more than 13,000 anti-tank missile launchers and rockets, and anti-aircraft missiles. In addition, over 121,000 communication devices, computers, electronic equipment and documents were also captured.

In April 2025, in response to increasing calls for its disarmament, Hezbollah expressed willingness to engage in discussions about its weapons with Lebanese President Joseph Aoun. These discussions would be contingent upon Israel's withdrawal from five hilltop positions in southern Lebanon and the cessation of its military strikes. President Aoun, who assumed office in January 2025, aims to consolidate all arms under state control and plans to initiate talks with Hezbollah amid growing domestic and international pressure. The 2024 conflict with Israel significantly weakened Hezbollah, resulting in the loss of key leaders and a substantial portion of its arsenal. A U.S.-brokered ceasefire requires the Lebanese army to dismantle unauthorized military facilities, particularly south of the Litani River. While Hezbollah may consider transferring its heaviest weapons to the army, it insists that Israel must first meet its demands. Discussions are underway among various Lebanese political leaders and institutions, including Parliament Speaker Nabih Berri and the Maronite Church. The U.S. has reiterated its call for Hezbollah's disarmament, and several Lebanese ministers advocate for a disarmament timetable based on post-civil war precedents. Hezbollah maintains it no longer has an armed presence south of the Litani, though Israel disputes this, accusing the group of retaining military infrastructure. Hezbollah emphasized diplomacy but warned of other options if Israel does not comply.

In July 2025, it was reported that Hezbollah had lost 10,000 fighters during the war, and that its military capabilities had also deteriorated significantly.

Israel's efforts against Hezbollah have focused on its military assets as well as its finances, with an emphasis on the estimated $700 million directed from Iran each year through intermediaries that accounted for most of Hezbollah's annual operating budget. Some of the earliest Israeli military efforts in March 2026 targeted the organization's supply of gold and foreign currency, as well as branches of the Al-Qard Al-Hasan Association, a non-profit financial institution that has been described as being "Hezbollah's bank in Lebanon". Money changing offices and gas stations were also struck, all as part of an effort to squeeze the organization's sources of funding. With the overland route through Syria cutoff in the wake of the Fall of the Assad regime in December 2024, Iranian funding efforts shifted to Beirut–Rafic Hariri International Airport, where Hezbollah influence allowed arms and cash to flow through. Under pressure from the United States, the Lebanese government blocked flights from Iran and took over security control of the airport. The Banque du Liban implemented controls that limited the ability of Hezbollah to accept international money transfers; restrictions were placed on connections between Lebanon's formal banking system and Al-Qard al-Hassan. To bypass these constraints, the hawala system had been used to send $1 billion in Iranian funds in 2025 via a network of broker transfers that passed through Iraq, Turkey and the United Arab Emirates, though sanctions have been placed on these brokers by the United States Department of the Treasury.

=== Israel ===
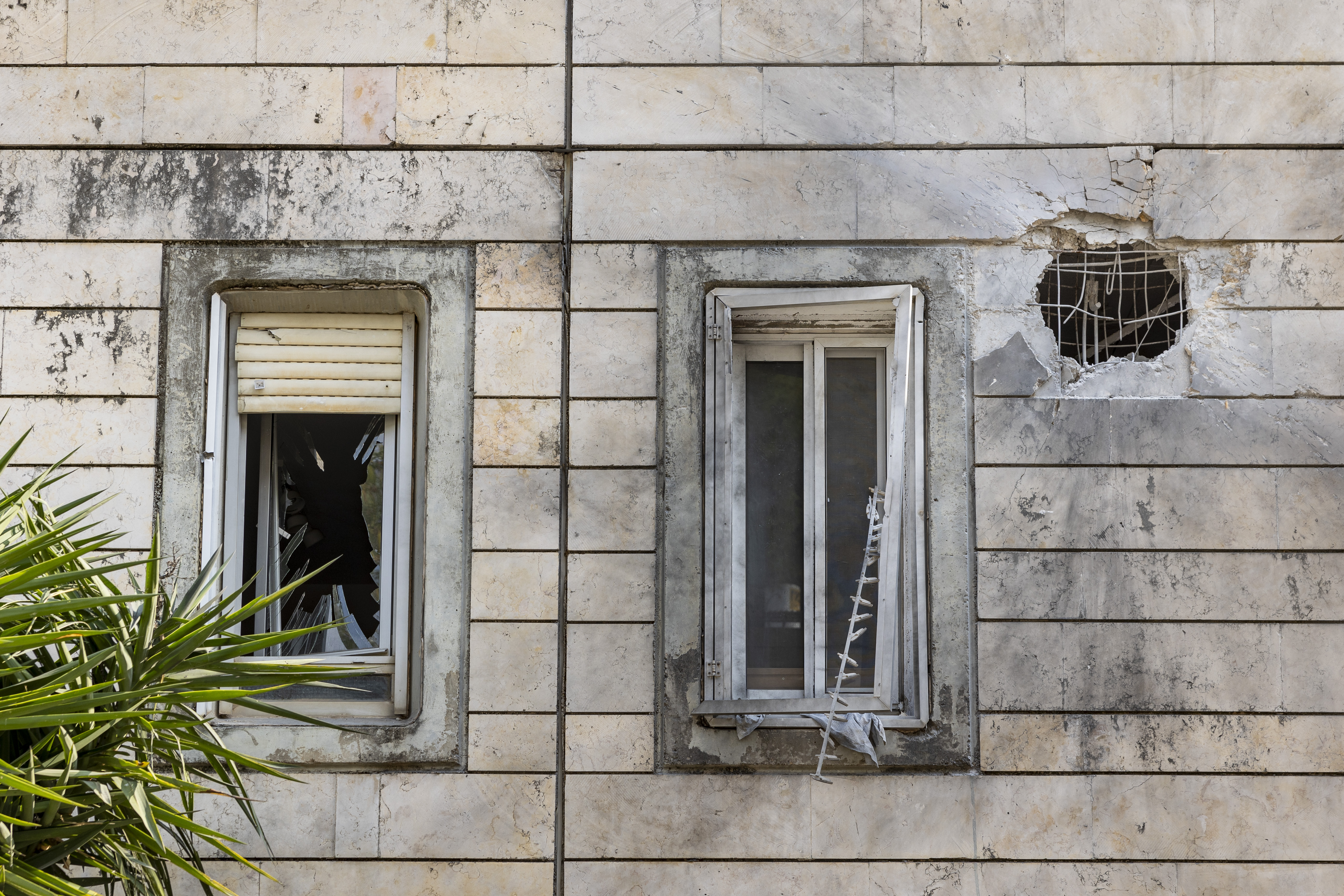
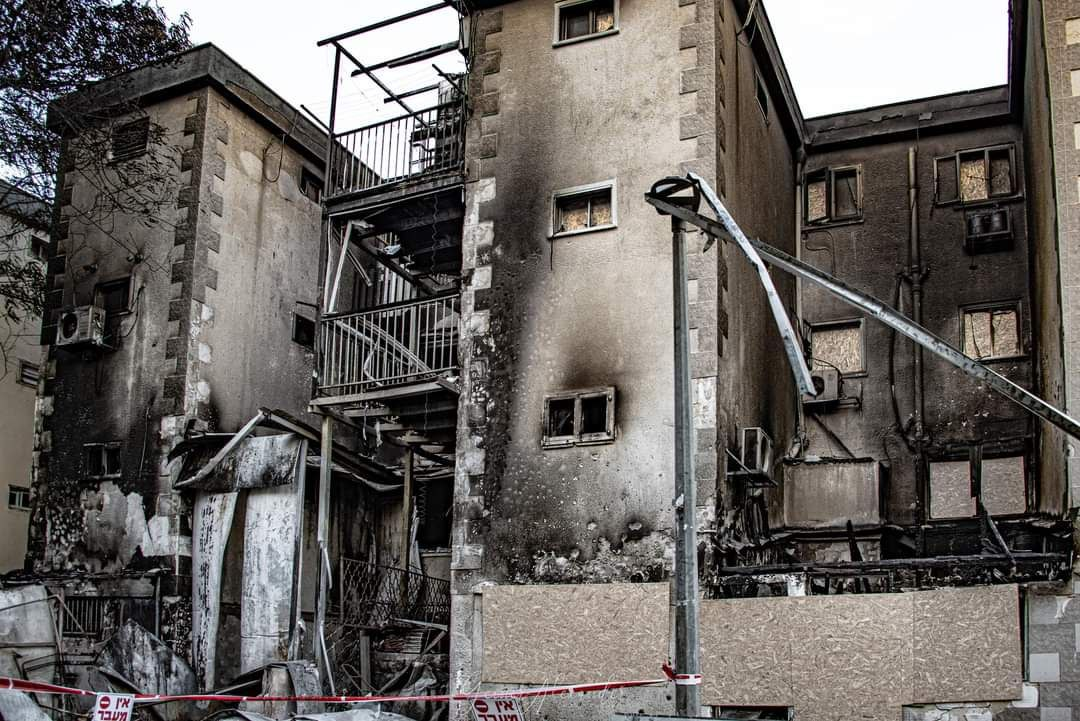
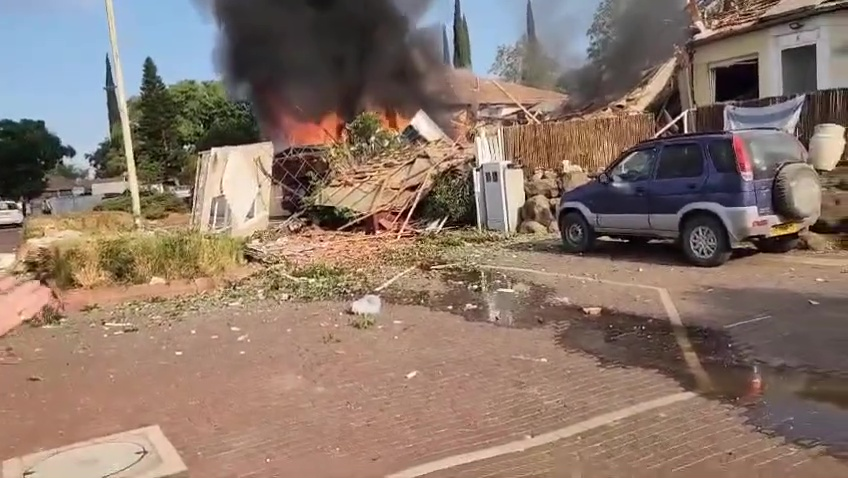
Clockwise from top: Damage to buildings in Kiryat Shmona and homes in Katzrin and forest fires due to rocket attacks from Lebanon

Forty-six Israeli civilians, 28 soldiers and one security officer were killed in Hezbollah's attacks on Israel. An additional three soldiers were killed in non-combat incidents; one by malfunctioning ammunition and the other two in a tank accident. Forty-seven soldiers, including a civilian researcher posthumously recognized as a soldier, were killed during combat in southern Lebanon. Hezbollah's attacks resulted in the evacuation of over 90,000 people—60,000 forced and 30,000 voluntary—from northern Israel. As of July 2024, the Israeli government issued orders for the evacuation of 43 settlements located within 3 miles (4.8 km) of the border with Lebanon. At least eight Israeli UAVs were shot down over Lebanon: four Hermes 450 and four Hermes 900 models.

According to the Israeli Army Radio, 2,874 buildings have been reported damaged by Hezbollah, including 841 in need of rebuilding. Property damage was estimated to be around ₪1 billion (US$273 million). As of November 2024, over 60% of the buildings in Metula were destroyed by Hezbollah attacks since the start of the conflict. Three-fourths of the buildings in Manara, 382 buildings in Kiryat Shmona, and 55,000 acres of nature in northern Israel and the Golan Heights have been damaged or destroyed by Hezbollah's attacks, while major damage also took place in Nahariya and Shlomi.

==== Economy ====
According to Tel Aviv University economist Tomer Fadlon, there would be long-term and significant effects on northern Israel's economy if its population did not return. He further said that even if Israel achieved victory in Gaza, the north would possibly not see an economic recovery. The conflict severely hurt the tourism industry in the north, which employs many people. Many factories in the region have not shut down but suffered labor shortages of up to 50%. According to an estimate by the Bank of Israel in November 2023, the Israeli economy suffers the loss of 590 million shekels ($158 million) every week due absence of work caused by the evacuation of 144,000 people after the Gaza war, 40% of them from the north.

Once-robust communities such as Snir and Kiryat Shmona were mostly emptied following the evacuation orders in northern Israel. Kiryat Shmona was planned to be used by food technology businesses, but companies left following the city's evacuation in October 2023. Northern Israel has one-third of Israel's agricultural land, and the occupied Golan Heights and Galilee accounted for 73% of Israel's annual egg production; however, after the outbreak of the conflict, few people remained in the north to tend chicken coops, resulting in a decline in domestic egg production. In August 2024, the Ministry of Agriculture and Food Security approved a quota for the import of 45 million eggs due to the anticipated drop in local production over the conflict and other reasons.

== War crimes ==
=== Israeli war crimes ===
==== Killing of Lebanese civilians ====
In September 2024, thousands of wireless communication devices exploded throughout Lebanon and Syria in an attack attributed to Israel, killing dozens of people, including civilians and Hezbollah militants. Lama Fakih, a director of the Human Rights Watch, said that the explosions would constitute an indiscriminate attack if the IDF had no way of accurately determining the location of the explosive devices since there would be no distinction between civilians and military targets. UN High Commissioner for Human Rights Volker Türk said that the attacks violated international human rights since the IDF did not have knowledge regarding the users of the devices or their location and surroundings during the explosions. According to the Syrian Observatory for Human rights, 232 Syrian refugees were killed by the IDF in Lebanon since the start of the Gaza war.

==== Targeting of journalists ====
According to the Council of Europe, the intentional targeting of journalists constitutes a war crime. During the conflict, Reporters Without Borders (RSF) claimed that the Israeli army had deliberately targeted journalists. An RSF investigation said that Israel had targeted journalists in two missile strikes on 13 October 2023 that killed Reuters reporter Issam Abdallah and injured four others. These two strikes, 30 seconds apart, hit a group of seven journalists in southern Lebanon who were reporting on the border fighting between Israel and Hezbollah. In a video, the journalists are seen wearing vests and helmets identifying them as "PRESS". The marking was also present on the roof of their car, which exploded after being hit by the second missile. The Netherlands Organisation for Applied Scientific Research, which tests and analyses munitions and weapons, assisted Reuters by examining the material collected at the site of the explosion and found that a piece of metal was the fin of a 120 mm tank round fired 1.34 km away from the border from a smoothbore tank gun. A February 2024 report by the United Nations Interim Force in Lebanon (UNIFIL) concluded that an Israeli tank killed Abdallah when it fired at "clearly identifiable journalists", and that this broke international law. The report "assessed that there was no exchange of fire across the Blue Line at the time of the incident", with no records of any exchange of fire across the border for the 40 minutes before the tank firing. The IDF responded to the report by claiming that Hezbollah attacked them, prompting them to retaliate with tank fire.

==== IDF's use of white phosphorus ====
On 31 October 2023, after an investigation, Amnesty International stated that an Israeli white phosphorus attack on 16 October was indiscriminate, unlawful, and "must be investigated as a war crime", due to its use on the populated Lebanese town of Dhayra, which injured at least nine civilians. On 2 November, Amnesty International stated its investigations into four incidents on 10, 11, 16 and 17 October showed Israel had used white phosphorus munitions. The claim was confirmed by the Washington Post, which identified two white phosphorus shell casings made in the U.S. Human Rights Watch verified IDF's use of white phosphorus in at least 17 municipalities in Lebanon, including five municipalities where airburst munitions were used over residential areas. It also called on the Lebanese government to file a declaration to enable investigations in the International Criminal Court.

In southern Lebanon, Israel's white phosphorus bombs have destroyed over 4,500 hectares (45 million m^{2}) of forest with economic loses being valued at US$20 million. The American University of Beirut estimated use of white phosphorus has led to more than 134 forest fires as of June 2024 burning 1,500 hectares (15 million m^{2}) of land. As of 28 May 2024, the Lebanese Ministry of Public Health said that exposure to white phosphorus had injured at least 173 people.

==== Targeting of medical and religious sites ====
The targeting of hospitals, as well as religious sites, constitutes a war crime. Lebanese health minister Firass Abiad said that 163 rescuers and health workers were killed and 273 others were injured in Lebanon since the start of Israel–Hezbollah conflict. Human Rights Watch stated that Israel's "repeated" attacks on medical workers and healthcare facilities were apparent war crimes. The IDF shelled Meiss Ej Jabal Hospital, injuring a doctor on 10 November 2023. The missiles did not explode but caused damage to the emergency department and several cars. Lebanon's Ministry of Public Health condemned the attack, saying that "Israeli authorities were fully responsible for this unjustifiable act, which would have led to catastrophic results", and called for an investigation. Days before, four people were reportedly injured after an Israeli bombing that hit two ambulances. The Lebanese National News Agency said that an Israeli drone strike hit two ambulances belonging to the Risala Scout Association, which is affiliated with the Amal Movement.

On 26 December 2023, an anti-tank missile shot by Hezbollah fighters from Lebanon damaged a shed in a church compound in Iqrit, but not the church itself, wounding an elderly civilian. As IDF troops and medical services were working to evacuate him, they were hit by further missiles, which resulted in nine soldiers being wounded, one of them seriously. On 11 January 2024, the IDF conducted strikes in the town of Hanine and targeted an emergency center affiliated with the Hezbollah-linked Islamic Health Authority. The attack killed two workers from the rescue force and destroyed an ambulance. Other attacks on Islamic Health Authority centers occurred in Kafr Kila, Odaisseh and Blida killed seven paramedic and rescue workers and destroyed 17 ambulances.

On 27 March 2024, an Israeli airstrike targeted a paramedic center affiliated with the Islamic Group in Hebbariye, killing seven volunteer paramedics. The airstrike was condemned by the Lebanese Ministry of Health. Later in the day, Israeli airstrikes in Tayr Harfa killed two paramedics from the Islamic Health Society, while strikes in Naqoura killed one from the Amal Movement-affiliated Islamic Risala Scout Association. On 7 May 2024, Human Rights Watch declared the 27 March incident as an unlawful attack on civilians and said that they did not find any evidence of military targets at the site that was targeted. Investigations also showed that the IDF used an MPR 500 missile to conduct the raid.

On 27 May 2024, an Israeli airstrike near Salah Ghandour Hospital in Bint Jbeil killed three civilians. WHO in Lebanon condemned the attack and called for the protection of hospitals and healthcare workers. In October 2024, the head of Lebanon's Civil Defence in the south said Israel was specifically attacking health workers, stating, "We have had 40 ambulances which have been completely destroyed. On top of that 24 rescuing stations have been hit - just in this area." Lebanese health officials stated on 5 October 2024 that fifty health officials had been killed in the prior 72 hours. Lebanon's health minister Firas Abiad stated the attacks were war crimes and part of Israel's systematic targeting of Lebanon's healthcare system. A November 2024 investigation found Israel had struck in "lethal proximity" to nineteen different hospitals in Lebanon.

==== Use of booby-trapped devices ====
Experts warned the 2024 Lebanon electronic device attacks potentially violated international humanitarian law. Josep Borrell, the European Union's High Representative for Foreign Affairs and Security Policy, questioned the legality of the pager attacks due to their high collateral damage among civilians, including the deaths of children. Jeanine Hennis-Plasschaert, the United Nations Special Coordinator for Lebanon, also raised concerns that the attacks were illegal. Belgian deputy prime minister Petra De Sutter went further, calling it a "terror attack". Volker Turk, the UN human rights chief, stated, "International humanitarian law prohibits the use of booby-trap devices in the form of apparently harmless portable objects".

Booby traps are mostly outlawed under the Protocol on Mines, Booby-Traps and Other Devices ("Amended Protocol II") of the Convention on Certain Conventional Weapons, to which Israel is a party. Article 7, paragraph 2 of Amended Protocol II prohibits the use of "booby-traps or other devices in the form of apparently harmless portable objects which are specifically designed and constructed to contain explosive material." The rules of engagement of some countries, such as the United Kingdom, also ban explosive devices disguised as harmless items. The United States Department of Defense Law of War Manual gives watches, cameras, tobacco pipes, and headphones as examples of such items, which are prohibited to "prevent the production of large quantities of dangerous objects that can be scattered around and are likely to be attractive to civilians, especially children". On 22 September 2024, Israeli President Isaac Herzog denied any Israeli involvement in the explosions.

=== Hezbollah war crimes ===
==== Killing of Israeli civilians ====
The elimination of the State of Israel has been a primary goal for Hezbollah. Hezbollah has been accused of "only [regarding] the Jews living in Israel as Zionists, who should be killed". Throughout the war Hezbollah announced the targeting of civilian homes. On 12 November 2023, Hezbollah fired an anti-tank missile killing an employee of the Israel Electric Corporation who was conducting repair work and injured 13 other Israelis, including six other employees of the Israeli Electric Corporation.

The most notable of Hezbollah's attacks on civilians was on 27 July 2024 in the Majdal Shams attack, when Hezbollah fired an Iranian-made Falaq-1 rocket at Majdal Shams, a Druze town in the Golan Heights. The rocket hit a football pitch killing 12 Druze children and injuring at least 42 others. Another attack by Hezbollah resulted in civilian casualties on 9 July 2024, when a rocket struck a couple's car just south of their hometown of Ortal. Additionally, a couple walking their dog in Kiryat Shmona was killed by shrapnel from a Hezbollah rocket on 9 October 2024.

On 26 December 2023, a Hezbollah anti-tank missile impacted near a Channel 13 News team while they were interviewing a farmer at Dovev for an article following a prior Hezbollah assault that killed a 56-year-old employee of the Israel Electric Corporation, and injured five workers who were repairing electric lines. Throughout the conflict, Hezbollah fired thousands of inaccurate munitions at Israel and the Golan Heights, killing and injuring civilians and destroying houses. A December 2024 report by Amnesty International found the use of unguided missiles on civilian areas to likely constitute indiscriminate attacks. International humanitarian law states that parties in a conflict must not direct attacks at civilians and must distinguish civilians and civilian infrastructure from military targets.

==== Accusations of Hezbollah using human shields ====
There have been claims that Hezbollah has intentionally drawn fire to Christian areas in southern Lebanon. Christians in the town of Rmaich clashed with Hezbollah due to the organization's attempts to establish military infrastructure in the town. The residents also wrote a complaint letter. On 26 March 2024, civilians in Rmaich confronted militants and rang their church bells after Hezbollah attempted to place rocket launchers in the town. Hezbollah denied trying to fire rockets from Rmaich. On 30 November 2024, the IDF said that it killed armed Hezbollah operatives near a church in southern Lebanon. A video appearing to be in the town of Khiyam, showed a tunnel shaft used to store weapons at the church.

The Lebanese Kataeb Party criticized Hezbollah for allegedly storing weapons between houses stating that "Hiding weapons between houses does not support Gaza" after an IDF strike on Hezbollah infrastructure in Adloun. Rockets were still exploding about an hour after the strike was reported and the blasts lightly injured three citizens as shrapnel from the explosions flew to surrounding villages. These ammunition depots "open the door to Israeli attacks and turn the Lebanese into human shields", the Kataeb party said.

According to IDF's Arabic spokesman, Avichay Adraee, Hezbollah-run yellow ambulances have been used to transport fighters and weapons. The Islamic Health Authority's website says it has "provided services for the activity of the Hezbollah fighters against the Zionist occupation." According to UNIFIL, Hezbollah has used the environmental NGO "Green Without Borders" to provide direct cover for Hezbollah's military operations by "unlawful construction of military outposts along the Blue Line." Hezbollah has also launched rockets from UNIFL positions. The IDF reported that 25 rockets were launched from UNIFL positions in October 2024 and said that it discovered hundreds of weapons, including firearms, grenades, and rocket launchers, stored in compounds located near UNIFIL posts in southern Lebanon.

After the 20 September 2024 Beirut attack which killed major Radwan Force commanders in the densely populated Dahieh suburbs, Daniel Hagari said that the commanders were holding a meeting "gathered underground under a residential building in the heart of the Dahieh neighbourhood, hiding among Lebanese civilians, using them as human shields." On 23 September 2024, the IDF began posting pictures and videos of what it claimed was evidence of Hezbollah placing weapons in people's homes. They also released video footage of secondary explosions after targeting buildings which it says are from Hezbollah munitions stored in residential areas.

== Reactions ==
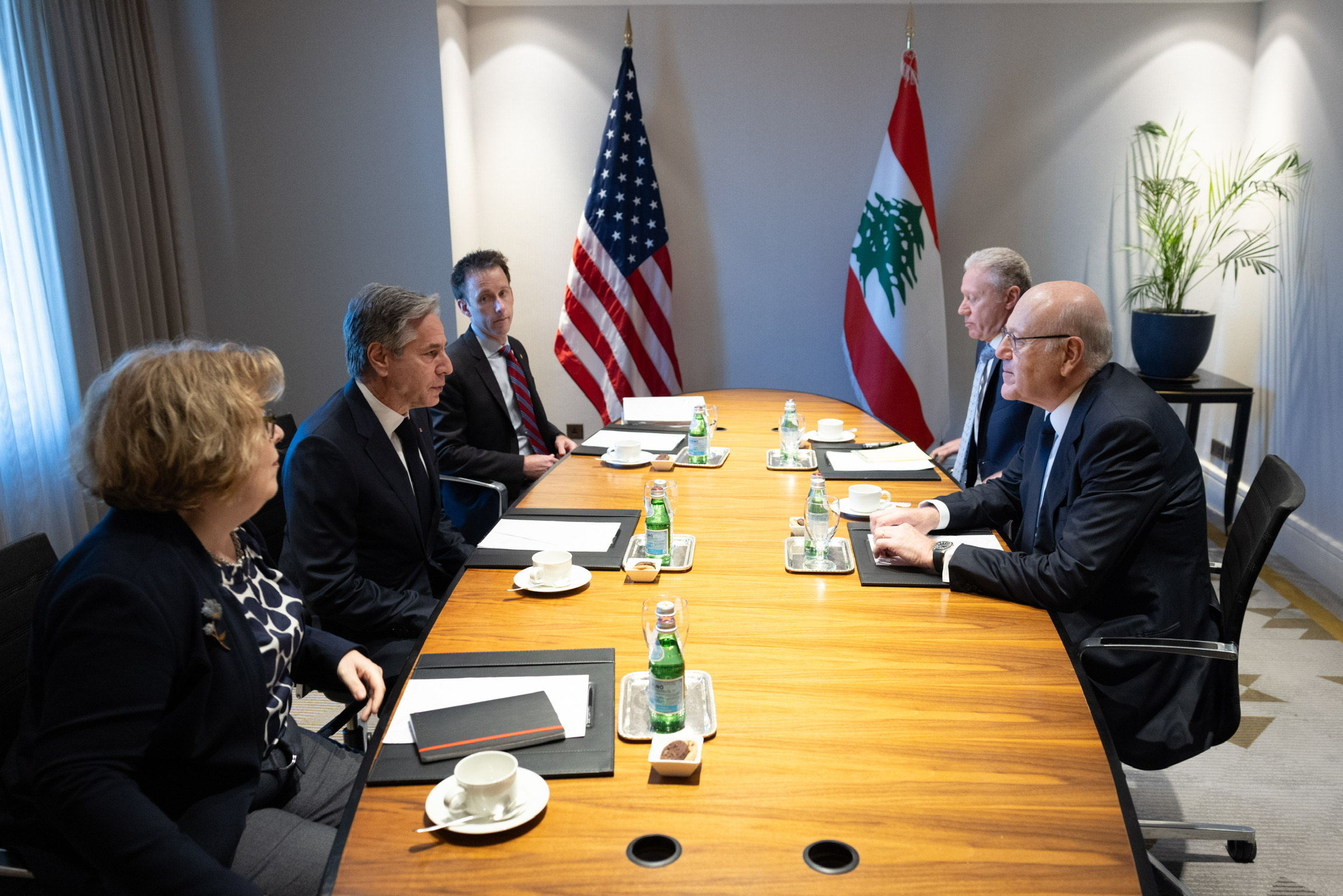
Secretary Blinken meets with Lebanese Caretaker Prime Minister Najib Mikati in Amman, Jordan.

=== Lebanon ===
On 6 November 2023, in response to the killing of four civilians in southern Lebanon, Prime Minister Najib Mikati announced that his government would submit an urgent complaint to the UN Security Council against Israel saying that its "targeting of civilians in its aggression against Lebanon" was a "heinous crime". Samir Geagea, the leader of a main Christian political party, blamed Hezbollah for attacking Israel and said that it harmed Lebanon while having no impact on Israel's Gaza offensive.

==== Public opinion ====
TWI poll of Lebanese who view Hezbollah positively (Note: Include all respondents who answered "very positive" and "somewhat positive")
Date	Shi'ite	Sunni	Christian
2020	89%	8%	16%
2023 (November)	93%	34%	29%

As tensions heightened on 8 October 2023 near the Lebanese border, former prime minister Fouad Siniora stressed that Lebanon should not be involved "in any hostilities with the Israeli enemy".

Between 7–9 October 2023, many politicians of long-established Christian parties in Lebanon took a stance against Hezbollah's involvement as well. Pierre Bou Assi, a member of the Lebanese Forces's Strong Republic bloc highlighted the kidnapping of two IDF soldiers which led to the 2006 Lebanon war saying, "Hassan Nasrallah promised, in early July, that the summer would be quiet and thriving—but a few days later, Hezbollah kidnapped two Israeli soldiers and the July war broke out". The Kataeb Party took a similar stance and condemned the use of Lebanese territory by non-state actors for launching attacks on Israel.

On 4 December 2023, Hamas announced the organization's official establishment in Lebanon. The Lebanon-based unit was named the "al-Aqsa Flood Vanguards unit". The establishment of the Vanguards during the 2023 Hamas-led attack on Israel faced severe criticism from various political figures and factions within Lebanon. Many argued that such an organization, with potential military implications, could infringe upon Lebanon's sovereignty and violate international resolutions, particularly the Taif Agreement. Critics, including members of the Christian Lebanese Forces Party and other political figures, voiced concerns about a potential recurrence of historical issues related to armed Palestinian factions operating from Lebanese territory.

Screens at Beirut–Rafic Hariri International Airport were hacked allegedly by the Christian group Jnud al-Rab to display an anti-Hezbollah message. Jnud al-Rab denied any involvement.

On 28 January 2024, Bechara Boutros al-Rahi, Maronite Patriarch and head of the Maronite Church, stated that residents of southern Lebanon refuse to be used as "sacrificial lambs" in what he described as a "culture of death", implicitly referencing Hezbollah's border activities. He described the hardships faced by the people, including psychological strain and disrupted education for children, and said they refuse to be hostages or human shields. On 24 March 2024, a video showed a nun at a Lebanese Christian school asking students to pray for Hezbollah men defending Lebanon. The video went viral, with some praising the video and others criticizing it. Palestinians in Shatila refugee camp told Al Jazeera that they would fight on the side of Hezbollah and the Axis of Resistance in a war against Israel, but worried for their families and civilians as they feared that Israel would deliberately target densely populated civilian areas.

=== Iraq ===
On 9 January 2024, the Kata'ib Hezbollah spokesperson Jafar al-Husseini warned that the Islamic Resistance in Iraq would help Hezbollah fight Israel if war erupted between the two sides. This statement was a few weeks after the Islamic Resistance in Iraq claimed responsibility for a drone attack on a Karish rig which Lebanon claims to hold sovereignty to. On 23 June 2024, the spokesperson to Kata'ib Sayyid al-Shuhada Kadhem al-Fartousi said the brigade will join Hezbollah's side if Israel decides to launch a full-blown war in Lebanon. On 24 June 2024, Qais al-Khazali, the leader of Asa'ib Ahl al-Haq, stated in a televised speech that if the U.S. continued to support Israel in expanding the war to Lebanon and Hezbollah, the group would begin to attack US interests in Iraq and the Middle East.

=== United States ===
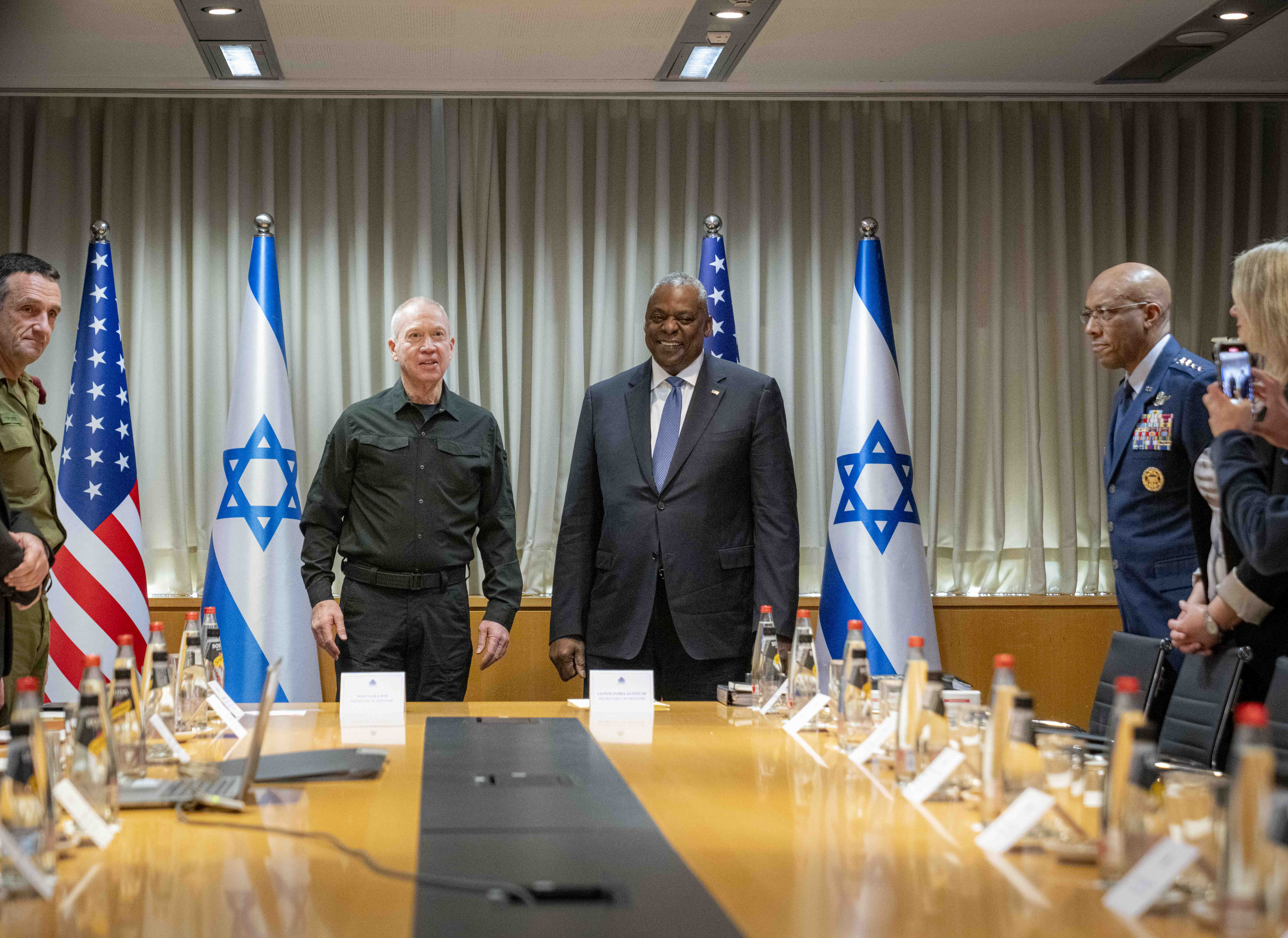
U.S. secretary of defense Lloyd Austin and Israeli defense minister Yoav Gallant in Tel Aviv, Israel, 18 December 2023

On 4 November 2023, United States Secretary of State Antony Blinken thanked prime minister Najib Mikati during a meeting in Amman "in preventing Lebanon from being pulled into a war that the Lebanese people do not want". U.S. Secretary of Defense Lloyd Austin expressed concern about Israel's role in ongoing tensions with Lebanon. On 30 September 2024, the Pentagon said it would be deploying a "few thousand" more troops to the Middle East. On 1 October 2024, Defense Secretary Austin told Israeli defense minister Yoav Gallant that the United States supports Israel's ground offensive against Hezbollah in southern Lebanon.

The U.S. Embassy in Beirut announced on 27 September 2024 that it was "not evacuating U.S. citizens at this time." In response, U.S. Representative Rashida Tlaib stated, the State Department was "leaving Americans behind and failing to protect their own citizens". American citizens in Lebanon stated they were being treated like "lesser US citizens". Lebanese Americans filed a class-action lawsuit against the State Department in the hopes of expediting an evacuation.

=== Other states ===
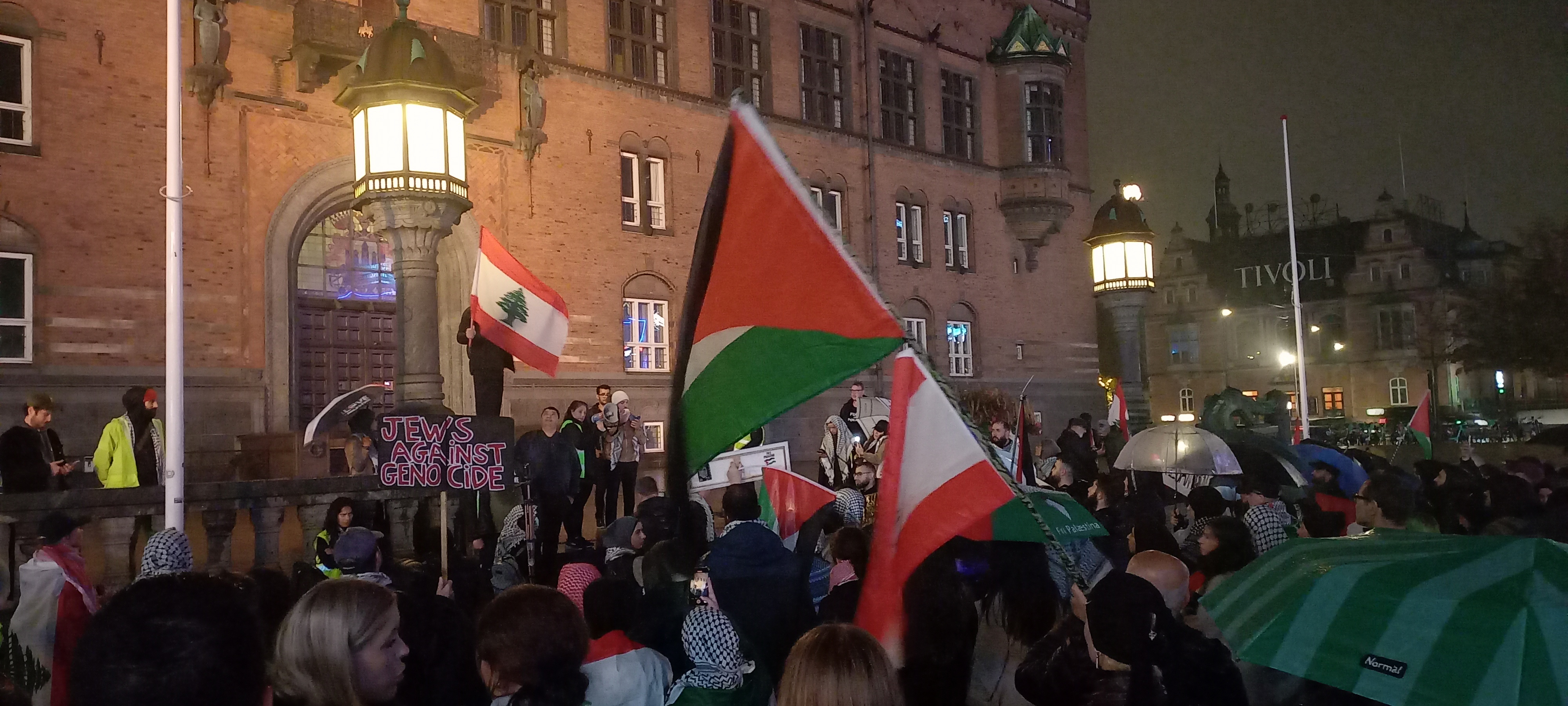
Demonstration against the bombing of Lebanon and Gaza in Copenhagen, Denmark, 24 September 2024

French Armed Forces Minister Sébastien Lecornu announced that France would donate dozens of armoured vehicles to the Lebanese military to help it carry out patrol missions. Since June 2024, the foreign ministries of Canada, Kuwait, Germany, the Netherlands and North Macedonia issued statements urging their citizens to leave Lebanon due to fears of an escalation of the conflict. The Canadian Armed Forces said that it was planning to evacuate its 20,000 citizens from Lebanon in the event of an escalation, although it would require support from its allies. On 8 November 2023, two men were arrested by Brazilian police in São Paulo following a warning from Mossad that Hezbollah was planning an attack against the country's Jewish community. Searches were also conducted in Brasília and Minas Gerais in connection with the alleged plot.

=== Economic ===
As a result of the fighting, Swiss International Air Lines and Lufthansa suspended flights to Beirut, while Lebanon's flag carrier Middle East Airlines relocated five of its 24 aircraft to Istanbul as a precaution. Australia, Canada, France, Germany, Spain and the United Kingdom advised against travelling to Lebanon, whilst the British embassy withdrew family members of its staff.

=== Humanitarian response ===
The Lebanon Humanitarian Fund launched its reserve allocation that includes up to US$4 million to support its partners to help aid those who have been displaced or still in conflict zones.

== Rearmament of Hezbollah ==
Event though the ceasefire agreement was signed by both parties, immediately after Hezbollah began its rearmament. According to Israeli and Arab intelligence sources, the organization is using the Beirut seaport and its old smuggling land routes from Syria, for bringing in long range missiles, antitank missiles, rockets, and artillery shells. It is also reported that, Hezbollah is manufacturing weapons. The efforts take place mainly in the suburbs of Beirut and the Bekaa Valley.

== See also ==
- List of projectile attacks from Lebanon on Israel and the Golan Heights
- Outline of the Gaza war
- Palestinian insurgency in South Lebanon
- Hamas in Lebanon
- April 2023 Palestinian rocket attacks on Israel
- Lebanese displacement during the Israel–Hezbollah conflict (2023–present)
- Ali Damoush
