= Meiss Ej Jabal Hospital =

- Lebanese Ministry of Health and the Health Network

Geography
- Location: Meiss Ej Jabal, Lebanon
- Coordinates: 33°10′10″N 35°31′32″E

Organisation
- Care system: Public
- Type: Teaching

History
- Opened: 2002

Links
- Lists: Hospitals in Lebanon

Meiss Ej Jabal Hospital is a government hospital with educational affiliations in Lebanon. It was founded in 2002 through the collaborative efforts of the Lebanese Ministry of Health and the Health Network. Situated in the village of Meiss Ej Jabal, it serves the Marjayoun district of the Nabatieh Governorate.

== Incidents ==
On 10 November 2023, during the Gaza war, an Israeli shell fell on the hospital, wounding a health worker, damaging the emergency department, and damaging a number of cars.

Dr Halim Saad, the director of Mays al-Jabal hospital’s medical services announced on Friday, October 4, 2024, that the hospital is unable to provide services to the injured due to Israel's attacks on Lebanon and cutting off resources, including running water.
