= Iran–Lebanon relations =

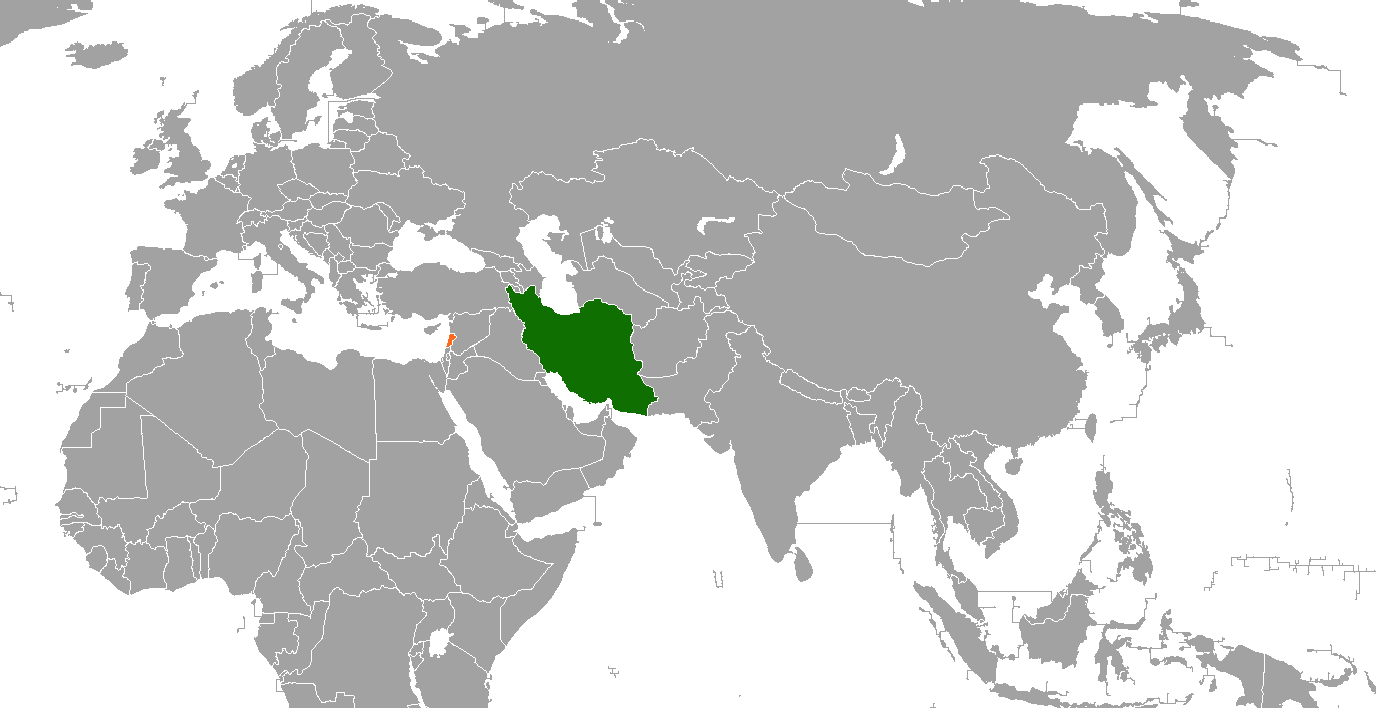

- Iran: Lebanon

Iran and Lebanon have diplomatic relations today, with embassies in each country. Historical connections date back to ancient times, when the Achaemenid Empire ruled Phoenicia (modern Lebanon). Lebanese city-states contributed ships and naval expertise to the Persian Empire.

Since the Iranian Revolution in 1979, The Iranian regime has been interfering in Lebanese sectarian politics and has influenced Lebanese Shia Political Parties.

In a 2012 Pew Global Attitudes survey, 39% of Lebanese people viewed Iran favorably, compared to 61% which viewed it unfavorably. 62% of Lebanese oppose Iranian acquisition of nuclear weapons, 57% consider a nuclear-armed Iran a threat, and 74% approve of "tougher sanctions" on Iran, while 46% support use of military force to prevent Iran from developing nuclear weapons. Notably, while most Sunni Muslims and Christians in Lebanon expressed unfavorable views of former Iranian President Mahmoud Ahmadinejad (92% and 57%, respectively), 95% of Lebanese Shi'a viewed him favorably.

== History ==
Relations between Iran and Lebanon during the reign of Shah Mohammad Reza Pahlavi occurred in two phases: The first phase lasted from the mid-1950s to the 1967 June war and was closely affected by the policies of Egyptian President Gamal Abdel Nasser, which led the Shah to support the government of Lebanon as well as other anti-Nasser governments in the Middle East; the second phase, from 1967 to 1979, witnessed tense relations because anti-Shah groups were trained by Palestinian militant organisations in Lebanon during this time span.

In a 2012 Pew Global Attitudes Survey, 39 percent of Lebanese people viewed Iran favorably, compared to 61 percent which viewed it unfavorably. 62 percent of Lebanese oppose Iranian acquisition of nuclear weapons, 57 percent consider a nuclear-armed Iran a threat, and 74 percent approve of "tougher sanctions" on Iran, while 46 percent support use of military force to prevent Iran from developing nuclear weapons. Notably, while most Sunni Muslims and Christians in Lebanon expressed unfavourable views of President Mahmoud Ahmadinejad, 92 percent and 57 percent respectively, 95 percent of Lebanese Shia Muslims viewed him favourably.

Amidst the polarised atmosphere of the Syrian Civil War, on 19 November 2013 two suicide bombings occurred outside the Iranian embassy in Beirut, Lebanon, killing 23 people, including an Iranian cultural attaché. A Sunni Islamist militant group claimed responsibility.

On 18 October 2024, Najib Mikati publicly criticized Iran, calling for its envoy to be summoned after remarks from Mohammad Bagher Ghalibaf suggested Tehran would assist in negotiating the implementation of U.N. Resolution 1701 regarding Lebanon. Mikati expressed surprise at Ghalibaf's comments, viewing them as blatant interference in Lebanon's affairs and an attempt to assert control over the country. He emphasized that any negotiations should be conducted solely by the Lebanese state.

On 24 March 2026, Lebanon decided to withdraw its approval of Mohammad Reza Raouf Sheibani, the Iranian ambassador to Lebanon, giving him until 29 March to leave the country. The decision was linked to "Tehran's violation of diplomatic norms and established practices between the two countries" he has still not left the country.

== Political relations ==
=== Political division ===
In Lebanon, support for ties with Iran are largely polarised over political lines with the March 14 Alliance opposing stronger ties, and the March 8 Alliance advocating stronger ties as a counterweight to Israel.

=== Political support ===
After all parties of the Lebanese government reached a consensus as part of the Doha Agreement, Iranian Foreign Minister Manouchehr Mottaki traveled to Lebanon and welcomed the agreement as a "great achievement" for the Lebanese people.

According to an Israeli source, Iran pays Lebanon's Speaker of the Parliament Nabih Berri 500,000 US dollars annually, the Amal Movement denied this and said Berri will not comment.

=== Hezbollah ===
Iran has been alleged to have founded and funded Hezbollah, a relationship that some say continues to this day in an apparent nexus with Syria. During the 2006 Lebanon War, between the state of Israel and Hezbollah, Iran came out in firm support of Hezbollah in particular, and Lebanon in general.

On 26 February 2025, Lebanon's new government, led by Prime Minister Nawaf Salam, won a confidence vote in parliament, backed by 95 MPs. Notably, the government's policy statement omitted past language legitimizing Hezbollah's defense role. Salam pledged economic reforms and renewed IMF negotiations to address Lebanon's financial crisis, which began in 2019. The government was formed on February 8, following U.S. intervention, aiming to unlock reconstruction aid.

== Military support ==
Following Lebanese President Michel Suleiman's visit to Tehran in 2008 and the signing of a military and economic agreement between the two countries, formal military ties were encouraged.

Following the 2010 Israel-Lebanon border clash and consequent American threats to cut off funding for the Lebanese Army should it not be verified that Hezbollah would be kept from getting access to it, Lebanon's Defense Minister Elias Murr set up a fund to ask for donations to the armed forced. A few weeks later Suleiman asked Iran to consider selling advanced military equipment to the Lebanese Army, while stating modernization should take place while keeping in mind Beirut's strategic needs as well as its budget limitations. The next day, Iran's Defense Minister Ahmad Vahidi expressed readiness to offer military aid to Lebanon. "Lebanon is a friend and its army is our friend. We are prepared to help them."

Iran's Ambassador to Lebanon, Ghazanfar Roknabadi, affirmed Iran's willingness to aid Lebanon as requested by President Sleiman and Defense Minister Elias Murr. Upon being asked if Iran was willing to sell advanced rocket systems, Abadi said the Iranian Defense Minister was clear on this matter. "Everything is open before Lebanon in supplying it with arms and supporting it other fields." He also affirmed Iran would help in solving Lebanon's electricity problems at international rates in six months. Lebanese parliamentary speaker Nabih Berri said that the Lebanese executive, as led by Saad Hariri, was afraid of the US' wrath and thus would not pursue the Iranian offer of arms supplies.

Iran's ambassador to Lebanon, Ghazanfar Roknabadi, vowed that Iran would support Lebanon in its battle with Israel.

== Economic relations ==
Iran's Ambassador to Lebanon Ghazanfar Roknabadi suggested trade relations between the two countries could reach US$10 billion.

On March 25, 2022, after their meeting in Beirut, Lebanese President Michel Aoun tweeted that Iranian Foreign Minister Hossein Amirabdollahian informed him that Iran was ready to support Lebanon in all spheres, "most especially in the distribution of wheat." In October 2025, Iran's Ambassador to Lebanon Mojtaba Amani stated that Lebanon rejected a $60 million humanitarian offer from the people of Iran. In his statement the reason for the rejection is the fear over the global sanctions on Iran.

== Ahmadinejad visit to Lebanon ==
Iranian President Mahmoud Ahmadinejad planned his first visit to Lebanon as president in October 2010, after his trip was previously delayed. His two-day visit included a tour of villages along Lebanon's tense border with Israel. He was scheduled to meet the Lebanese president, Prime Minister Saad Hariri and Speaker of Parliament Nabih Berri.

Iran's ambassador to Lebanon, Ghazanfar Roknabadi, said the visit was "aimed at fostering unity among the Lebanese and calling all Lebanese to stand beside each other for resistance and that is why Israel is furious and has threatened Lebanon...President Ahmadinejad is visiting Lebanon at the invitation of Lebanese President Michel Sleiman and the visit has political and economic dimensions."

=== Reactions ===
The visit came amidst concern from the United States, who also warned their citizens against travel to Lebanon, Israel, labeling the visit "provocative" and section of the March 14 alliance, who also initially called the visit "provocative" but were more quiet after similarities were made with Avigdor Lieberman's comments such as Samir Geagea. Israel was monitoring his visit and increased the threat level on their northern border.

Binyamin Netanyahu said of Ahmadinejad's speech that "we heard the curses and epithets from the Lebanese border. The best answer to those who curse was given here 62 years ago: the state and all that we have built and created since then. Look at this nation, look at this state, look at the army that the nation of Israel has. We will continue to build continue to create our state and we will know very well how to defend ourselves." Foreign Ministry spokesman, Yigal Palmor, also said "It is a provocative and destabilizing visit. It appears his intentions are blatantly hostile and he is coming to play with fire." France also called the visit provocative.

His visit also comes at a time of concern over Lebanon stability following rumours of an indictment by the Special Tribunal for Lebanon. His Lebanese counterpart, Michel Suleiman, however, asserted Lebanon's right to host foreign dignitary. The March 8 alliance's parliamentary leader Michel Aoun also came out in support of the visit and hit back at Israel and the US' reactions saying they were "disgraceful and offensive," while lauding Iran because "[since] the revolution, Iran has always been backing Lebanon. We can see that not only in words but in actions. [Iran is] backing Lebanon with nothing in return."

Hezbollah Secretary-General Hassan Nasrallah gave an address before the arrival praising Iran's contributions to Lebanon's postwar reconstruction. He was also expected to attend a rally on the day of the arrival at the Al-Raya stadium in southern Beirut. He also said that though "there are those... who speak of an Iranian scheme for Palestine, for Lebanon, for the Arab region... and work to strike fear into governments and peoples[,] what Iran wants for Lebanon is what the Lebanese want. What Iran wants in Palestine is what the Palestinians want. That is the Iranian scheme."

The party's Deputy Secretary General Sheikh Naim Qassem hailed the visit as having succeeded before it starts and that since Suleiman invited him "Lebanon wants this visit to consolidate relations and ties between Lebanon and the Islamic Republic of Iran. We all know Iran’s services in Lebanon, we all know what Iran did in Lebanon without asking for anything in return." He cited pressure from United States, Europe, Israel and others as "proof" that the visit was "more important than we thought" Former Lebanese Prime Minister Salim Hoss also said "Iran is very mindful of good relations, strong relations with Arabs because this will give Iran space in the international arena with the Arabs on their side." He also criticised Israel and the US' objections on the grounds that the visit would "[open] the eyes of the world to the situation on the border."

A cabinet meeting chaired by the president and presided over by the prime minister called him "the honorable guest." The Minister of Youth and Sports, Ali Abdullah, said the visit was "significant," while the Energy and Water Minister, Gebran Bassil said the visit would bring positive achievements for Lebanese. The Agriculture Minister, Husayn al-Hajj Hassan, said Ahmadinejad would receive a warm welcome by all Lebanese, Information Minister Tarek Mitri said the visit would be a sign of solidarity, Health Minister Muhammad Jawad Khalifa hoped the visit would strengthen bilateral relations, and a minister of state, Adnan Kassar said Iran could help curtail political tensions in Lebanon. Former March 14 members Walid Jumblatt also said the visit "enhanced Lebanon's steadfastness against any aggression."

Prior to landing he had a called three other regional leaders to discuss regional issues: Saudi Arabia, Syria, Jordan. The Deputy Head of the Majlis' National Security and Foreign Policy Committee, Hossein Ebrahimi said Ahmadinejad's visit "is one of the important and rare developments that has happened since [the victory of] Islamic Revolution;" and it would strengthen the Lebanese, Syrian and Palestinian resistance and show "that the establishment of the Islamic Republic will always stand beside these countries."

Following the visit, United Nations Secretary-General Ban Ki-moon expressed fears about the climate of "uncertainty" in the country that could cause instability across the region. He called on regional powers to stay out of Lebanon and urged Israel to halt military overflights in violation of Lebanon's sovereignty. Speaking of the political differences in the country he said: "The combination of mistrust between the parties and the continued presence of militias could lead to tensions and possible insecurity and instability in Lebanon and beyond. "The country should not be used as a staging ground to further regional aspirations or to promote conflict."

==== Media ====
Al Manar hailed the visit, and called it "historic."

Haaretz said Israeli defense officials believed Ahmadinejad would show support for Hezbollah and "hurl insults at Israel," though it added that the trip "is not intended to ignite another round of violence in the region."

Yedioth Aharonoth’s Ynet quoted Knesset MP Arieh Eldad: "History would have been different if in 1939 some Jewish soldier would have succeeded in taking Hitler out. If Ahmadinejad will be in the crosshairs of an IDF rifle when he comes to throw rocks at us, he must not return home alive." It also said "in Bint Jbail, a large replica of the Al-Aqsa Mosque in Jerusalem has been constructed, with an Iranian flag atop it" and the visit was meant to "showcase and confirm this" to the media. It added that Ahmadinejad was coming to Lebanon to deliver a warning. “(His) visit will showcase and confirm this. It may even have the effect of briefly focusing rare media attention on it. But beyond this, for Israel the trip consists, as one newspaper put it, of a largely “symbolic visit” by the “man who calls the shots” in south Lebanon.”

The Jerusalem Post talked about Ahmadinejad's expected visits to the battlegrounds of 2006 war and said he reportedly wanted to go to the border to "throw rocks [at Israeli occupation soldiers]." They quoted an Israeli diplomat who said: "Israel will not be harmed by the visit. We are not afraid of his visit; he will be just another terrorist in southern Lebanon. It is Lebanon that needs to be concerned, allowing the Iranian Trojan horse into the country. It is their sovereignty that is being chipped away." Foreign Ministry Spokesman Yossi Levy was quoted as believing "Lebanon, not Israel, would be the party to suffer most from Ahmadinejad’s scheduled visit next week to southern Lebanon. Lebanon is the primary victim, and if it wants to stop slipping into the jaws of the Iranian crocodile, it—and the moderate Arab world—should raise a strong voice and say this provocateur is not welcome."

Time magazine said the visit gave Ahmadinejad "an opportunity to change the subject" as the visit "underscore[d] three harsh truths:" Iran is not as isolated as the United States would have liked; the Bush Administration's efforts to vanquish Iran and its allies had failed; and, that the balance in the region prompted even US-allied Arab regimes to engage pragmatically with an expanded Iranian role in the region. They also read his visit to the south as "intended to warn Israel off attacking Iran."

=== Visit events ===
During the visit he met with officials, political leaders, academicians, and university students. Ahmadinejad had a joint press conference with the Lebanese President, in which Suleiman condemned Israel's threats and praised Iran's support in "confronting Israel's aggression, particularly after the July 2006 war which enabled Lebanon to withstand the enemy," as well as differentiating between terrorism and resistance.

He said the Palestinians have the right of return, and all "occupied Arab land" must be returned. He called for further joint work amid the signing of agreements in various fields during this trip. For his part, Ahmadinejad thanked his counterpart for the invitation to visit, as well as thanking Hariri, the Lebanese cabinet and the "Lebanese people for all their courage." He also praised the "Lebanese people for their resistance against the Zionist enemy." He said bilateral cooperation between two were "unlimited."

He reiterated Suleiman's criticisms of Israel, while supporting the Palestinian cause and calling for the return of refugees, as well as the liberation of all "Palestinian territories" and the Lebanese and Syrian territories under occupation, saying the region could "never see justice with the Zionist enemy." He denounced "external interventions," while saying the region could take care of its own affairs. He concluded saying the Iranian people would stand side by side with all the Lebanese people and thanked them for the reception he received.

During questions with the press, he said "we don't see any obstacles [to relations] as the two are "free people;" he also said both countries are seeking a "lasting peace" and "development of justice" because of their "joint interests." Analysts read this as Lebanon moving away from its traditional benefactor in the United States and towards Iran with the signing of the various deals, including culture and education. Nasrallah called Iran the guarantor of Lebanon's security. He added that Israeli aggression would not lead to stability.

Berri hosted a dinner in Ahmadinejad's honour and attended by a host of political and religious groups. Berri thanked Ahmadinejad for his support of "Lebanon’s right to resistance with the aim of liberating its land and defending its sovereignty" and for Iran's willingness to arm the Lebanese Army because "friends have offered aid and the Iranian help would be unconditional." He said Iran was backing the resistance for "all the Lebanese, rather than arming of the Shiites in Lebanon." He also supported Iran's right to "the peaceful use of nuclear energy," while calling Israel's nuclear disarmament as global nuclear disarmament would be impossible otherwise. Ahmadinejad responded in kind "We, as well as other countries in the region, hope to achieve justice in the Middle East."

On the second day, he visited the Hezbollah stronghold on the southern border, where he was warmly received. He also gave a speech in a village by the border where he said: "Lebanon is the school of resistance and perseverance against the bullying forces of the world, and is like a university for jihad, for adventure in the way of the noble, human causes," while also calling for a united Islamic world. During his visit he spoke to a cheering crowd of 15,000 and said "Today the Lebanese nation is alive and is a role model for the regional nations. Zionists are mortal".

He continued his rhetoric against Israel "The only solution to the Palestinian issue is for the invaders of the occupied land to leave, and give the Palestinians their rights and return all the refugees to their original land." He then referred to the controversy in Lebanon at the time about the Special Tribunal for Lebanon over the assassination of Rafic Hariri: "Arrogant hegemonic powers used the sinful hand of treachery in Lebanon to reach a dear friend and a dignitary who was loyal to his country. Then accused another remaining friend in order to sow division, and then we see how reports get fabricated."

Saying "resistance is the key to the victory of Lebanon and all the countries of the region," he called Bint Jbeil "the capital of resistance and victory" because its inhabitants "stood against them and secured the territorial integrity of Lebanon, [people of Bint Jbeil are] the protectors of humanity, dignity and independence." He called on the United Nations to force Israel to abide by international laws and resolutions. In Qana, he spoke to the residents and officials, saying the "martyrs of Qana are the proof of oppression. [And] I am here to thank you for your pride, resistance and perseverance. Iranian nation and leadership will stand by the people of Qana and Lebanon to the end."

He also met Nasrallah, and had a lunch hosted for him by the Saad Hariri, where the two held a meeting with Berri and Suleiman as well.

Lebanese University gave Ahmadinejad an honorary doctorate in political science. Hezbollah and Amal thanked him for his visit, and Nasrallah presented him with an Israeli rifle, captured during the 2006 war, in reciprocity for Iran's support.

=== Post-visit reaction ===
Both Nasrallah and Aoun stressed the importance of the visit. The Majlis' National Security and Foreign Policy Commission's spokesman Kazem Jalali said the response to the visit undermined the West and Israel's media hype as "the historical Lebanese greeting sneered at the propaganda campaign;" and that "Western leaders, including US officials, pay nightly or unexpected visits to regional states such as Iraq and Afghanistan and leave with no public appearance among large crowds. This is while President Ahmadinejad's visits are all planned in advance. Despite recurrent threats, Iranian officials have a bold presence among people as they believe that the people of regional states are in charge of ensuring security."

Upon returning from Lebanon, Ahmadinejad stressed his support for the "Lebanese people's courageous resistance" and that "the sons of southern Lebanon will determine the future of the region. It is unacceptable that decisions be made on behalf of this brave people by any foreign powers." Tehran's interim leader for Friday prayer, Ayatollah Kazem Seddiqi, praised the visit as "one of the glories of the Islamic establishment and miracles of the Revolution. The enemies imposed sanctions on us and meant to pretend that Iran is isolated but this visit demonstrated they [are] isolated and that we have penetrated other nations' hearts."

US Assistant Secretary of State for Near Eastern Affairs Jeffrey Feltman arrived in Lebanon the following week reportedly to "do something" to offset the reception Ahmadinejad received. He said that "I don’t think Ahmadinejad’s visit will have a lasting effect. It’s not something extraordinary. Its impact will remain for a couple days and that’s it." Iran's Supreme Leader Ayatollah Ali Khamenei said that the reception Ahmadinejad received was unprecedented and had never been organised at such a level for any president. He also alleged that the media perverse realities, and the visit should not be underestimated or ignored.

Al Manar's reaction after the visit was cautious. They read the visit as having "emphasised unity," but asked "for how long?" It also said one of the biggest beneficiaries of the visit, along with the country's Shia community, were the Palestinian refugees in Lebanon. The Guardian said the western media was complicit in dutifully following their governments' words. It cited an American journalist as following the state line in saying: "This is Ahmadinejad's first visit to Lebanon, and he couldn't have picked a better time to provoke outrage." The article then countered the statement saying:

But just who did he outrage exactly? In total, hundreds of thousands of mostly Shia Lebanese came out to the various events celebrating Ahmadinejad's visit. Even rightwing Christian politicians in Lebanon such as Samir Geagea—who couldn't be further away on the political spectrum from Hezbollah and Iran—came out to welcome Ahmadinejad, who he described afterwards as "moderate" in tone. If Ahmadinejad's visit to Lebanon signaled anything, it's that the balance of power is shifting in the Middle East. And as that happens we'll most likely see even more leaders and movements in this region take stands against the policies of western governments. More camels may even be killed in the process." Hopefully [the] western media can distance themselves from their governments to accurately report these changes, rather than share in their condemnation and disappointment, paving the way for them to put their threats of war into practice.

A poll conducted by the Beirut Center for Research and Information showed that 70 percent of respondents were satisfied with Ahmadinejad's visit and 68 percent believed that Ahmadinejad's visit decreased a possibility of sectarian strife. Additionally, 58 percent considered Iranian projects and plans in Lebanon did not conflict with Lebanese interests; and 80 percent approved of Iran's proposed aid to the Lebanese army, with 86 percent considered US and French stances against the visit as interference in Lebanon's internal affairs.

Following the visit, Hamas also invited Ahmadenijad to Gaza.

== Anti-Iranian unrest in Lebanon since 2019 ==
Since 2019, large protests broke out in Lebanon where Lebanese people accused the government of cronyism, corruption and mismanagement; but the protest was significant as it openly challenged Iranian influence, notably Iranian meddling in Lebanon's political system, and anti-Hezbollah remarks among the Lebanese populace, this had increased due to widespread violence and oppression Hezbollah officials did to the protesters.

Iran had blamed the West of fueling the unrest while at the same time distancing itself from the protests out of fear of an ongoing backlash against Iran among Lebanese public. Anti-Iranian sentiment has seen a major spike in 2021 as the majority of protesters are demanding that Iran quit the country.

on August 7, 2025, Iran's Foreign Minister Abbas Araghchi spoke against Lebanon's decision to disarm Hezbollah, stating that it will surely fail, as Hezbollah is strong and has Iran's commitment to it. Lebanese officials were outraged by his comments, causing Foreign Minister Youssef Rajji to summon Iran's ambassador making note that the comments are an unacceptable interference in Lebanon's internal affairs. Other Lebanese politicians like MP Ghayath Yazbeck went even further, calling for a UN complaint over what they described as an attack on Lebanon's sovereignty.

== IRGC ban ==
On 5 March 2026, during the 2026 Iran war, it was announced that all activity of the Iranian IRGC in Lebanon is banned. In addition, it was decided to require Iranian nationals to obtain a visa to enter Lebanon. The Lebanese foreign minister also said that the government is "to end Iranian influence in the country". On 24 March, they ordered the Iranian ambassador to leave the country by 29 March. On 30 March, Israeli foreign minister Gideon Sa'ar said that the ambassador had not left, and claimed that Lebanon was "effectively under Iranian control." The fact that the ambassador had remained in Lebanon was later confirmed by the Iranian foreign minister.

== See also ==
- Shia Islam in Lebanon
- Shia Islam in Iran
- Iranian Arabs
- Safavid conversion of Iran to Shia Islam
- Iranians in Lebanon
- Iranian smuggling to Lebanon
- Lebanese Iranians
