= 9600 port =

Connector used on amateur radio transceivers

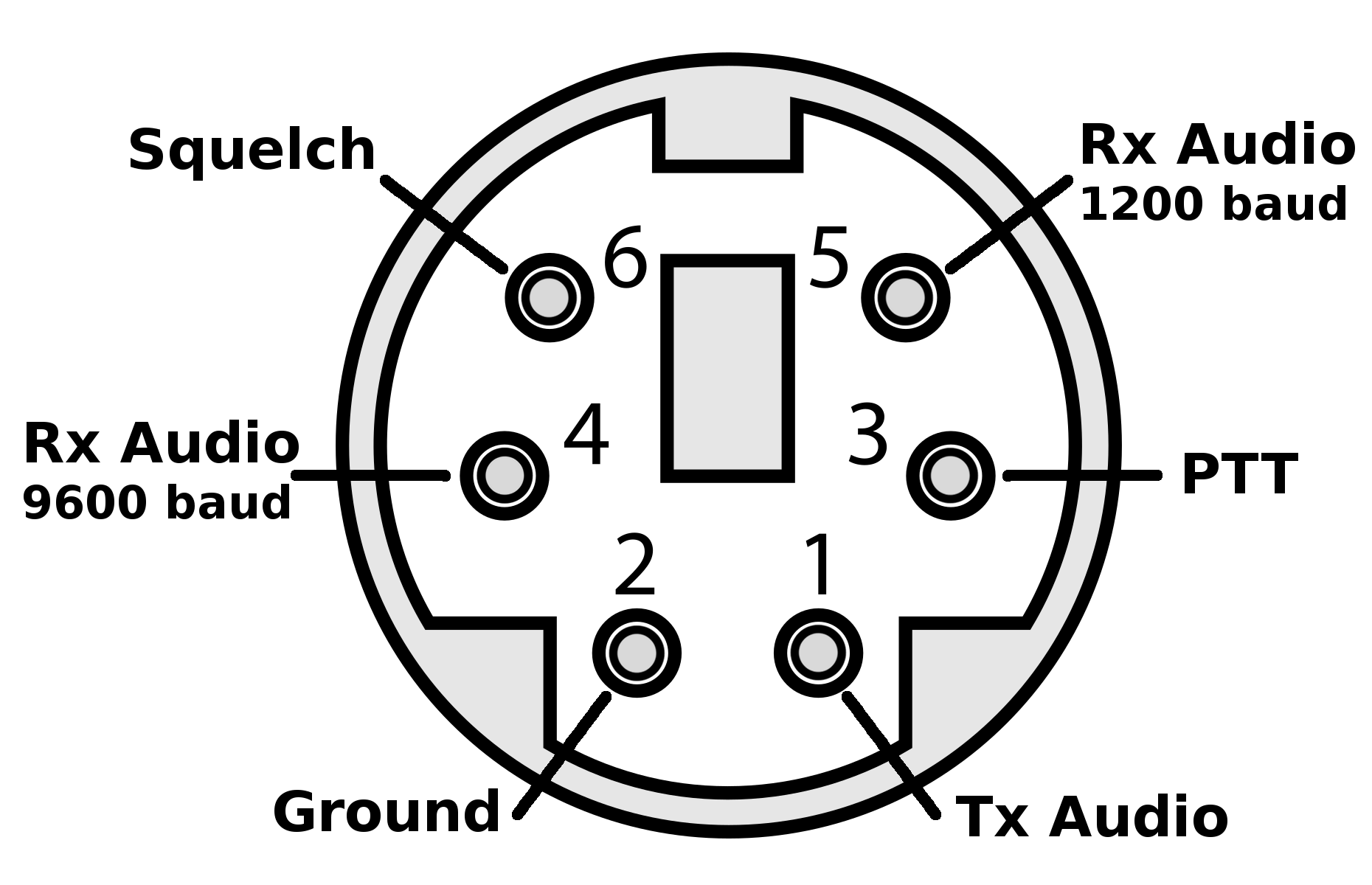
Most common pinout for 9600 port data jack on amateur radios

The '9600 port' (also named data-jack or data-port) is an industry-specific name given to a special connector on the back of amateur radio HF, VHF, and UHF transceivers. It is used for connecting a packet radio modem or any other type of data-modem which uses audio tones to convey data.

This port is capable of transmitting and receiving data at speeds of at least 9600 bits per second, but usually faster. This is achieved by bypassing the highpass, lowpass, preemphasis, and deemphasis filters normally contained in the microphone and speaker circuits of an FM transmitter and receiver.

Amateur radio data ports which are not "9600 capable" are typically limited to a max speed of 1200 to 3000 bits per second.

Commonly this 9600-capable data port uses a 6-pin mini-DIN connector (shown to the right). This is the same physical connector-type as PS/2 port mice and keyboards.

== Modem manufacturers ==
There are a number of manufacturers making modems intended for this 9600 port / data port.

- Kantronics
- Tigertronics
- Argent Data
- Byonics
- Coastal ChipWorks
- MFJ Enterprises
- Symek
- Timewave Technologies
- Masters Communications

== Radio manufacturers ==
There are a number of manufacturers making radios which include a 9600 capable data port as a feature:

- Alinco
- Icom Incorporated
- Yaesu
- Kenwood

== Software modems ==
The 9600 port can also be connected to computer's soundcard for use with a number of different software-based data modems:

- Direwolf
- MixW
- AGW Packet Engine
- Soundmodem
- UZ7HO Soundmodem

== Digital voice ==
The 9600 port can be used to connect a digital voice adapter, or dongle, which allows analog amateur radios to transmit and receive ICOM's D-Star digital voice protocol (AMBE2020).

- Digital Voice Dongle
- Star*DV / Star*Board
- DVRPTR_V1 D-Star boards
- PAPA GMSK Boards
- DUTCH*Star

== Uses ==
This 9600 port is used to communicate with some amateur radio satellites using the packet radio.

A 9600-baud capable amateur radio and modem are installed aboard the International Space Station as part of the ARISS project.
