= Ghazanfar Roknabadi =

Iranian diplomat (1966–2015)

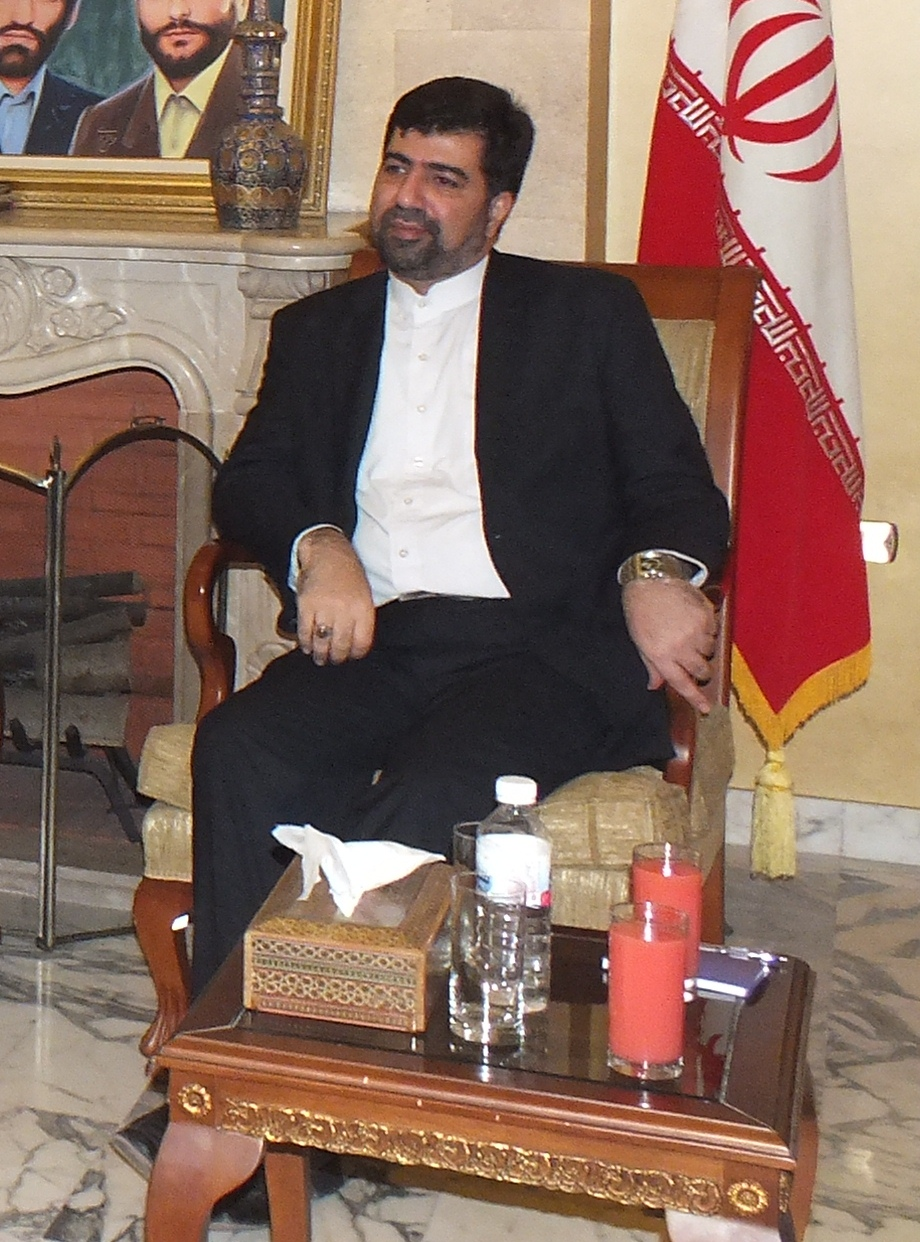

Ambassador of Iran to Lebanon
- In office 10 May 2010 – 20 May 2014
- President: Mahmoud Ahmadinejad; Hassan Rouhani
- Preceded by: Mohammad Reza Raouf Sheibani
- Succeeded by: Mohammad Fathali

Personal details
- Born: Ghazanfar Mohammad Asl Roknabadi; March 21, 1966 Qom, Iran
- Died: September 24, 2015 (aged 49) Mecca, Saudi Arabia
- Party: Independent
- Education: Imam Sadiq University (M.A.); Lebanese University (Ph.D.)
- Profession: Diplomat, politician

Ghazanfar Mohammad Asl Roknabadi (21 March 1966 – 24 September 2015) was an Iranian diplomat, who served as the Iranian ambassador to Lebanon from 2010 to 2014. Rokanabadi is known to have had strong ties to Lebanon's Hezbollah. He survived many assassination attempts during his service in Lebanon.

== Life and educations ==
Ghazanfar Rokanabadi was born on 21 March 1966 in Qom, Iran as the first child of the family. His family consists of 4 sons and 4 daughters. Ghazanfar Roknabadi was the eldest child of the family. From his childhood, he was a man of study and worship. At the age of 12, he participated in demonstrations related to the Iranian revolution. After the victory of the Iranian revolution and then Saddam's invasion of Iran, while he was not more than 15 years old, he went to the battlefields of Iran-Iraq War eagerly to defend his homeland. At the same time, he continued his education. He served all the time until the war ended.

In 1985, Roknabadi was admitted to Imam Sadiq University through an exam. While it was possible for him to continue his education in the famous universities of Iran, but his great desire to study in the field of religious sciences and humanities drew him to Imam Sadiq University. Attending Imam Sadiq University and study in the field of Islamic education and political science, laid the groundwork for his acquaintance with revolutionary ideas and his contact with prominent revolutionary fighters of his time, including Sheikh Saeed Sha'ban, Seyyed Abbas Mousavi (former Secretary General of Hezbollah). In this regard, he was offered cooperation in the Ministry of Foreign Affairs of Iran and he accepted.

He completed his master's degree in political science and Islamic education at Imam Sadiq University. He then studied for a doctorate in the same field at the University of the Lebanese Community in Lebanon. He was fluent in English, Arabic and Turkish.

He got married in 1989 and had three daughters named Zahra and Fatemeh, Reyhaneh.

During the 33-day Lebanon war in August 2006, Roknabadi used motorcycle to deliver needed packages to the Lebanese people. His action was so outstanding that Seyyed Hassan Nasrallah (3rd secretary-general of Hezbollah) wrote a handwriting in appreciation and thanks to Rokanabadi and gave it to him.

== Career ==
Roknabadi entered the Ministry of Foreign Affairs in 1990, and served in the following positions:

- Chargé d'affaires and Deputy Ambassador to Syria
- Spokesman, Iranian Gaza Reconstruction Committee
- President, Committee for the Support of the Islamic Revolution in Palestine
- First Secretary, Embassy of Iran, Lebanon
- Head of the Middle East and Persian Gulf section, Ministry of Foreign Affairs
- Ambassador to Lebanon

== Surviving from the Iranian embassy bombing ==
On 19 November 2013 following the bombing of the Iranian embassy in Beirut by Saudi agents led by Majed al-Majed, a Saudi security officer who led the Abdullah Azzam Brigades, Rokanabadi was miraculously rescued. The day after the explosion, a "acceptance and consolation" ceremony was held at the Iranian embassy, and the Lebanese president came to the Iranian embassy to offer his condolences.

== Death ==
Following the 2015 Mina disaster on 24 September 2015, some media outlets reported that he might have been killed in the incident. For several months there was no definite information about his fate. Al-Arabiya also previously reported contradictory reports from former Iranian ambassador Ghazanfar Roknabadi, with some reporting his disappearance in the Mena crowd and others saying he had suffered minor injuries. Hassan Qashqavi, Deputy Consul and Parliamentary Affairs of the Ministry of Foreign Affairs of Iran, referring to the issues raised about the possibility of Roknabadi having been kidnapped, said in Saudi Arabia: "These issues are only speculation, but this claim can not be definitively denied or confirmed. He was finally confirmed to have died in the crush, which killed at least 2,262 people.

Iranian media released footage on 29 September, showing Roknabadi's presence in Mina. The passport that showed his entrance into Saudi Arabia was also released by Iranian media.
