= Mojtaba Amani =

Iranian diplomat (born 1963)

- مجتبی امانی
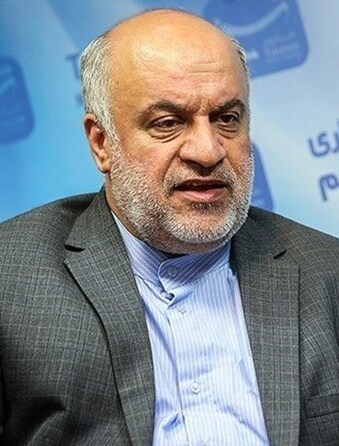
- An undated photo of Amani prior to the injuries sustained in the September 17, 2024, Lebanon pager explosions

Ambassador of Iran to Lebanon
- In office July 2022 – January 2026
- President: Ebrahim Raisi; Masoud Pezeshkian
- Preceded by: Mohammad-Jalal Firouznia
- Succeeded by: Mohammad Reza Raouf Sheibani

Personal details
- Born: 21 March 1963 (age 63) Iran
- Spouse: Narges Ghadirian
- Children: 2
- Education: Tehran University (M.A.); Azad University (Ph.D.)
- Profession: Diplomat

Mojtaba Amani (Persian: مجتبی امانی; born 21 March 1963) is an Iranian diplomat, who served as Iran's ambassador to Lebanon from 2022 to 2026. Prior to this, he headed Iran's interest section in Egypt from 2009 to 2014.

== Education ==
Amani holds a master's degree in International Relations from the University of Tehran.

== Professional experience ==
Amani began working at the Ministry of Foreign Affairs in 1988, with his first role as the Deputy Head of the Minister's Office.

=== Other roles ===
- Expert in the First Department of Middle East and North Africa.
- Deputy Representative of the Islamic Republic of Iran in Cairo.
- Expert in the Office for Political and International Studies.
- Deputy Director of the Office for Political and International Studies.
- Head of the Iranian Representation in Cairo.
- Senior Expert on Egypt Studies in the Office for Political and International Studies.

== Career ==
=== Iranian ambassador to Lebanon ===
In September 2024, during the Lebanon pager explosions, Amani was injured by an exploding pager. The New York Times reported that he lost one eye and sustained injury to the other, though the Iranian embassy in Beirut denied these claims. His first public appearance since the pager explosion took place in November 2024. He was seen with injuries to the hand, face and eyes.

In January 2026 he was replaced by Mohammad Reza Raouf Sheibani.
