= 9600 =

9600 may refer to:

- The year 9600, in the 10th millennium.
- ATI Radeon 9600, a computer graphics card series
- The 9600 port
- NVIDIA GeForce 9600, a computer graphics card series
- RTM build number of Microsoft's Windows 8.1 operating system
