= Iranian embassy bombing =

Iranian embassy bombing may refer to:

- 2013 Iranian embassy bombing in Beirut
- 2024 Iranian consulate airstrike in Damascus

== See also ==
- Iranian Embassy siege
