= Non-interference =

Non-interference may refer to:

- Noninterference (novel), by Harry Turtledove
- Non-interference (security), a security policy model
- Opposition in international relations to intervention in other countries' Westphalian sovereignty
- Noninterference directive, better known as Prime Directive, a policy in the Star Trek universe
- Non-interventionism, foreign policy that holds that political rulers should avoid interfering in the affairs of foreign nations relations but still retain diplomacy and trade, while avoiding wars unless related to direct self-defense.

== See also ==
- Interference (disambiguation)
- No Interference, album by Dysrhythmia
