= Icom IC-V82 =

VHF band transceiver device

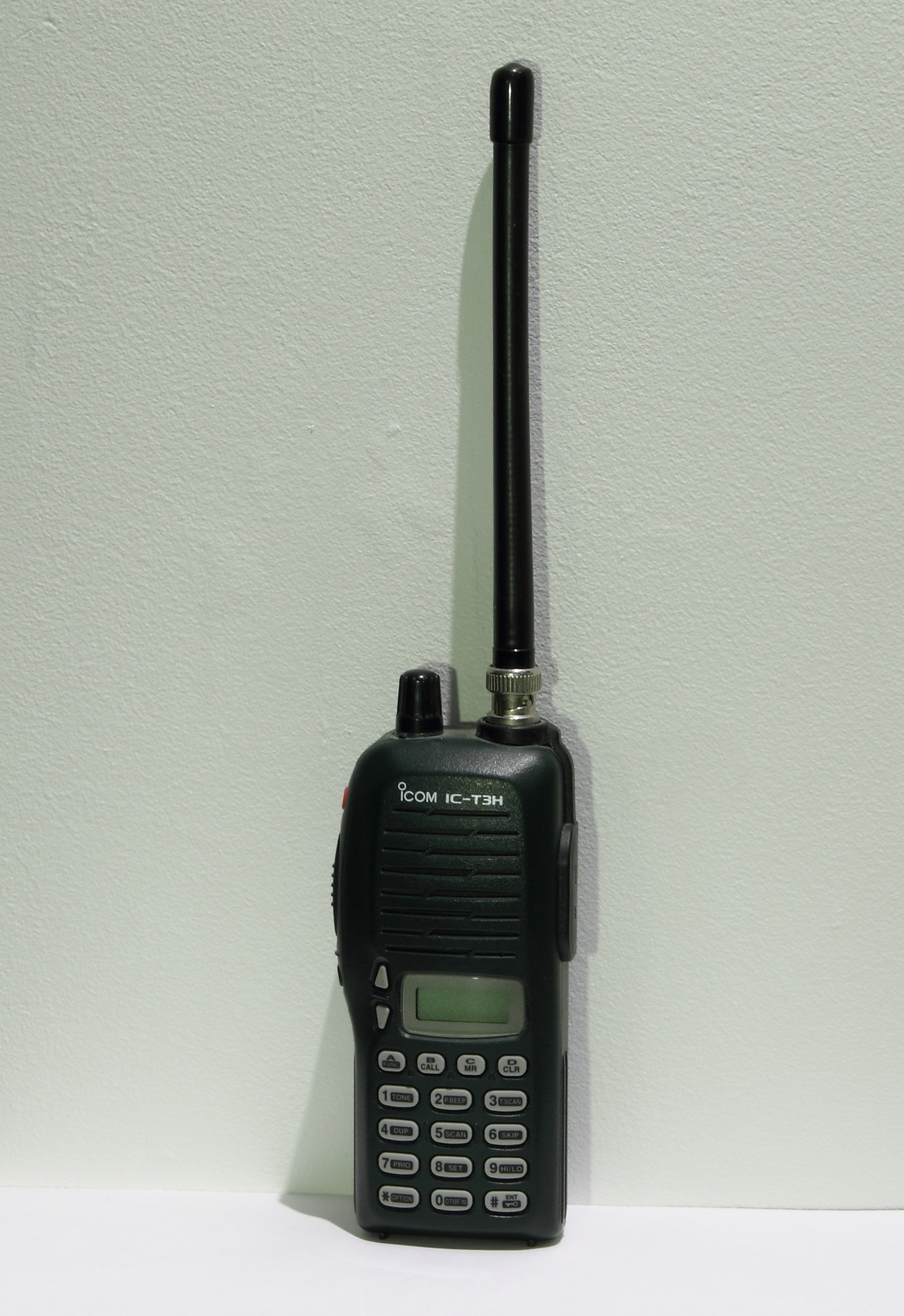
Icom IC-V82
noframe
Technical data
Frequency range	136–174 MHz
Frequency steps	2.5–50k Hz
Emission power	7 W (H), 4 W (M), 0.5 W (L) PEP
modulation	FM
No. of channels	207 channels with 6 scans + 1 call
consumption	Reception: 20 mA, Emission: 1 A max.
Operating voltage	6 – 10.3 V, nominal voltage 7.2 V
Measurements and weight
high	139 mm
width	54 mm
depth	36.7 mm
weight	approx. 390 grams
More information
Manufacturer	COM
Scope of application	radio amateurs, (semi)professional users

The Icom IC-V82 is a VHF band handheld transceiver designed by Icom for radio amateurs and professionals who require VHF communication. Launched in 2004 and discontinued in 2014, the IC-V82 is still valued in the second hand market for a number of additional features such as the ability to convert it, by adding a module, into a digital device, which make it ideal for certain applications requiring voice and/or data encryption.

== Features ==
It is a portable VHF transceiver with coverage in the two-meter band (144–146 MHz) and a maximum output power of 7 watts. It was manufactured and sold by Icom from 2004 to 2014.

- frequency : VHF 136-174 MHz
- output power : 7 W (high), 4 W (medium), 0.5 W (low)
- modulation : FM (Frequency Modulated)
- channel memory : 207 channels
- screen : LCD with backlight
- battery : BP-222N (Ni-Cd) or BP-227 (Li-Ion)

=== Digital module ===
An optional Icom UT-118 Digital Unit added D-STAR digital voice (DV) and low-speed data to the IC-V82. With the module installed the transceiver could operate in analog FM or D-STAR DV (emission type F7W). DV used the AMBE vocoder at 4.8 kbit/s (voice plus a slow-data channel) and supported callsign routing and callsign squelch, a 20-character transmit message, and position exchange when an external NMEA GPS receiver was connected to the data jack. The same UT-118 was offered for the UHF IC-U82 handheld and the IC-2200H 2 m mobile.

The UT-118 did not provide encryption, trunking, or DMR. D-STAR voice encoding is compression, not encryption; callsigns travel in the clear in the DV header.

== History ==
In June 2022, United Against Nuclear Iran, a U.S. advocacy organization, identified the Icom IC-V82 as being used by Hezbollah, a U.S. designated Foreign Terrorist Organization. It sent a letter to Icom outlining its concerns about the dual-use capability of the transceiver (analog+encrypted-digital) and regarding Icom's business ties to Power Group (Icom's representatives in Lebanon) and Faza Gostrar, which claims to be the "Official ICOM representative in Iran".

Many of the devices purchased by Hezbollah that later played a role in the 2024 Lebanon electronic device attacks, killing at least 25 people and wounding over 708, were reported as being IC-V82s. Icom opened an investigation into the case on 19 September 2024, while a sales executive at the company's U.S. subsidiary said the devices involved appeared to be counterfeit units.

=== Counterfeit models and controversy ===
After Icom discontinued the IC-V82 in 2014, counterfeit models emerged in China. In addition, another counterfeit model was sold to Hezbollah, and many of the devices used by this group, including pagers like the Gold Apollo AR924, were exploded on 18 September 2024.

Having ceased its production, Icom issued an advisory warning about counterfeit transceivers, including the IC-V82. In October 2018, the company issued a cease-and-desist order against a Chinese manufacturer suspected of producing counterfeit Icom products; it also noted that this was not the first time it had taken such steps.

== Protocols ==
=== IIDAS ===
IIDAS is Icom's implementation of the NXDN protocol for two-way digital radio products intended for commercial private land mobile radios (PLMRs) and low-end public safety communications systems. NXDN is a Common Air Interface (CAI) technical standard for mobile communications. It was jointly developed by Icom and Kenwood Corporation.

=== D-STAR ===
The "open" D-STAR radio system was developed by Icom based on digital radio protocols developed by the Japan Amateur Radio League and funded by the Ministry of Posts and Telecommunications of Japan. This system is designed to provide advanced voice and data communications over amateur radio using open standards.

== Accessories and options ==
The IC-V82 has a variety of accessories that improve its functionality and ease of use:

- Antenna : High gain antenna to improve reception and transmission.
- Belt Clip : For comfortable and safe transport.
- Optional batteries : Available in different capacities and technologies (Ni-Cd, Li-Ion).
