= Iran–Syria relations =

- Iran: Syria

Official diplomatic relations between the Islamic Republic of Iran and the Syrian Arab Republic are currently frozen following the fall of the Assad regime, formerly one of Iran's closest allies in the world. The new Syrian government and the Iranian government have left their respective ambassadorial posts vacant.

Syria established diplomatic relations with Pahlavi Iran after independence, but it was not until the Iranian revolution that Alawite-led Syria established close ties with Iran. Despite several attempts between the two leaders at cooperation during the Cold War, after the shah failed to secure Syrian help in ending Palestinian support for opponents of his pro-Western government, Hafez al-Assad put "his full weight behind" Ruhollah Khomeini, then exiled in France. Under Ba'athist rule, Syria was usually called Iran's "closest ally". Iran and Syria had a strategic alliance ever since the Iran–Iraq War, when Syria sided with non-Arab Iran against neighbouring Ba'ath-ruled Iraq. The two countries shared a common animosity towards then-Iraqi president Saddam Hussein and coordination against the United States and Israel until the fall of the Assad regime after the 2024 Syrian opposition offensives were completed on 8 December 2024.

During the Syrian Civil War, Iran conducted, alongside Russia, "an extensive, expensive, and integrated effort to keep Syrian President Bashar al-Assad in power." In September 2022, Iranian state media reported that high-level officials from Iran and Syria discussed the prospects of "mutual cooperation in the field of oil and gas," suggesting that the two countries were considering forming a joint oil and gas company.

With the collapse of the Assad regime in December 2024, the Iranian embassy was ransacked, and Iranian diplomats and Quds Force commanders fled the country. This event has been described as a significant blow to Iran's Axis of Resistance.

== History and overview ==
=== Ancient history ===
In 539 BCE, Cyrus the Great, King of Achaemenid Persians, took Syria as part of his empire, to become known as Eber-Nari. The Persian rule lasted until Alexander the Great conquered the region in 333–332 BCE. Later on, Khosrow II of the Sasanian Empire managed to control the region including Syria from 609 to 628 AD during their war against the Byzantine Empire.

=== Medieval history ===
Buyid Iran and the Hamdanid Emirate of Syria and Jazira vied for dominance in the Middle East. The Iranians were able to expel the Hamdanids from Baghdad. By the end of the 10th century, Syria and Jazira were under Fatimid, Iranian, or Eastern Roman influence.

Iran under the Aq Qoyunlu and Syria under the Mamluk Sultanate continued to compete for Upper Mesoptamia until the Ottoman Empire took over.

=== Prior to 1979 ===
Following the independence of Syria in 1946, Iran established a consulate there. Both countries established diplomatic relations on 12 November 1946 when has been accredited Envoy Extraordinary and Plenipotentiary of Iran to Syria with residence in Beirut Mr. Zein-el-Abdine Rahnema.

In 1953, Iranian Prime Minister Mohammad Mossadegh and Syrian President Fawzi Selou signed the Syria-Iran Friendship Treaty, but the agreement soon fell apart after both leaders were overthrown.

During the Pahlavi dynasty, especially since the establishment of the Ba'athist Iraq which was considered an enemy by both countries, the two countries had overall mixed relations, due to the shah's close ties with the United States and other Western powers, and Hafez al-Assad's general alignment with the Soviet Union. Examples of some overtures included Pahlavi Iran supported United Nations Security Council Resolution 316 urging Israel to free five Syrian officers captured in Lebanon, and Hafez al-Assad's four-day trip to Tehran in 1975 and the signing of cooperation agreements between the two countries, and the president tried to talk the shah into distancing himself from Israel. Nevertheless, after Reza sought and failed to secure Syria's role in ending Palestinian support for the opponents of his monarchy, Hafez al-Assad "put his full weight behind" the France-based Ruhollah Khomeini, who later returned to Iran after the fall of the Pahlavi government. The Assad government provided Khomeini's entourage with passports to move around Europe freely prior to the revolution.

However, after the improvement of Iran–Iraq relations in late 1970s, Hafiz al-Assad voiced support for Iranian dissidents, contacting opposition groups via their contacts abroad such as Mostafa Chamran and Musa al-Sadr and undertaking to train Iranian guerrillas.

=== 1979–1990s ===
Iran–Ba'athist Syria relations

- Iran: Syria

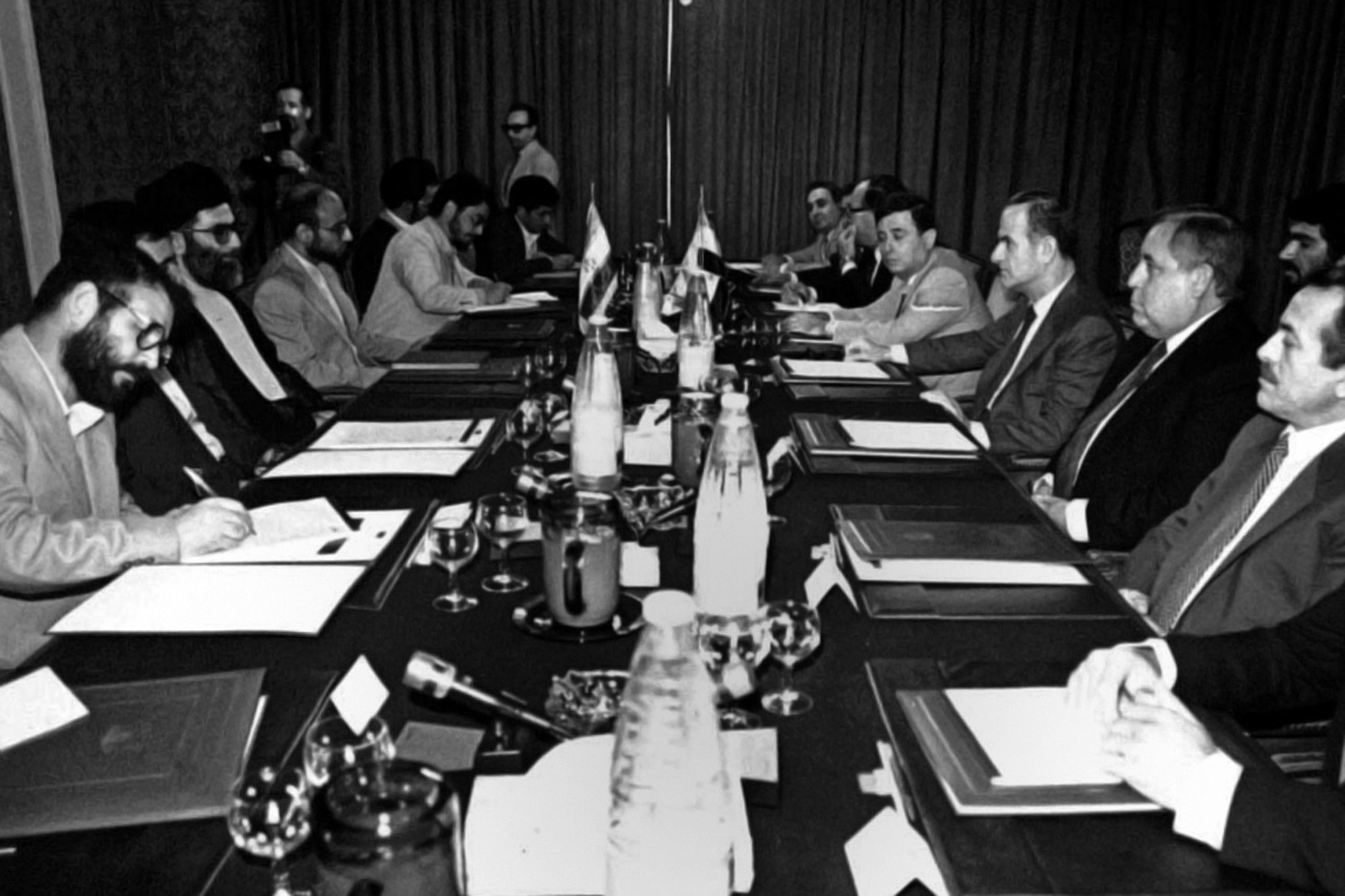
Meeting of Hafez Al-Assad and then Iranian president Ali Khamenei in Damascus, September 6, 1984.

Iran–Syria relations improved after the Iranian Revolution in 1979. Syria's strategic alliance with Egypt ended around the same time due to Egypt's treaty with Israel. Post-Revolution Iran represented an opportunity for Syrian President Hafez al-Assad to find a new counterweight to Israel and Iraq, Syria's regional foes. Meanwhile, the new Iranian leader Ayatollah Khomeini saw Syria as a conduit to the Shia community in Lebanon. Mostafa Chamran, a close adviser to Khomeini, had experience fighting in Lebanon and advocated an Iranian alliance with Assad to increase their influence in southern Lebanon. As the grip of Alawite echelons in the Syrian Baath party tightened; Assad also pursued a close alliance with the Khomeinist theocracy of Iran during the 1980s.

The relationship between Iranian and Syrian governments has sometimes been described as the Axis of Resistance. Syria was the first Arab state and the third in general, after the Soviet Union and Pakistan, to recognize the Islamic Republic, founded in February 1979. Specifically Syria officially recognized the Islamic Republic on 12 February 1979. However, Assad did not visit Iran while Khomeini was alive, as the Ayatollah did not consider Assad to be a true Muslim. The Syrian leadership, including the current president Bashar Assad himself, belongs predominantly to the Alawite branch of Shi'a Islam. However, the relations between the two countries do not depend on religious causes, because Syria is a secular state, while Iran is an Islamic republic. Instead, their ties are driven by common political and strategic points.

One of the first major fronts of the Iran–Syria alliance was Iraq. During the Iran–Iraq War, Syria sided with non-Arab Iran against Iraq and was isolated by Saudi Arabia and some of the Arab countries, with the exceptions of Libya, Lebanon, Algeria, Sudan and Oman. As one of Iran's few Arab allies during the war, Syria shut down an Iraqi oil pipeline (Kirkuk–Baniyas pipeline) to deprive the Iraqis of revenue. Syria also trained Iranians in missile technology and provided Iran with Scud B missiles between 1986 and 1988. In return for Syria's war support, Iran provided Syria with millions of free and discounted barrels of oil throughout the 1980s. In addition, Khomeini was restrained in his condemnation of the 1982 Hama massacre.

The second major area of cooperation between the two countries was in Lebanon during the Lebanese Civil War. Iran's Islamic Revolutionary Guard Corps, with Syrian assistance, established and trained the Hezbollah group to spread Khomeini's ideology and repel the 1982 Israeli invasion of southern Lebanon. Iran and Syria viewed Hezbollah as a useful lever against Israel and a way to establish greater influence in Lebanese affairs.

Iran and Syria had occasional differences in policy. In the mid-to-late 1980s, Syria maintained support for the non-Islamist Shia Amal Movement in Lebanon, even as Iran tried to maximize Hezbollah's power among Lebanese Shia. Although Iran was deeply ambivalent about the American-led intervention to remove Saddam Hussein from Kuwait, Syria participated in the coalition of nations to fight Iraq. Still, these disagreements never threatened to derail the relationship.

=== 2000s–2011 ===
The alliance deepened in 2000 when Hafez's son Bashar al-Assad took over as President of Syria. Subsequent events like the Iraq War, the "Cedar Revolution", and the 2006 Lebanon War brought the countries closer together. Syria became increasingly dependent on Iran for political and military support, as Assad was unable to maintain positive ties with other Arab powers during this time.

On 16 June 2006, the defense ministers of Iran and Syria signed an agreement for military cooperation against what they called the "common threats" presented by Israel and the United States. Details of the agreement were not specified, however the Iranian defense minister Najjar said "Iran considers Syria's security its own security, and we consider our defense capabilities to be those of Syria." The visit also resulted in the sale of Iranian military hardware to Syria. In addition to receiving military hardware, Iran has consistently invested billions of dollars into the Syrian economy.

Currently, Iran is involved in implementing several industrial projects in Syria, including cement factories, car assembly lines, power plants, and silo construction. Iran also plans to set up a joint Iranian–Syrian bank in the future. On 17 February 2007, Presidents Ahmadinejad and Assad met in Tehran. Ahmadinejad afterwards declared that they would form an alliance to combat U.S. and Israeli conspiracies against the Islamic world.

In February 2010, President Ahmadinejad visited Damascus to sign a bilateral deal to remove travel visas between the two states, amid calls from U. S. Secretary of State Hillary Clinton to Syria to distance itself from both Iran and Shiite militia Hezbollah.

=== Syrian Civil War (2011–2024) ===
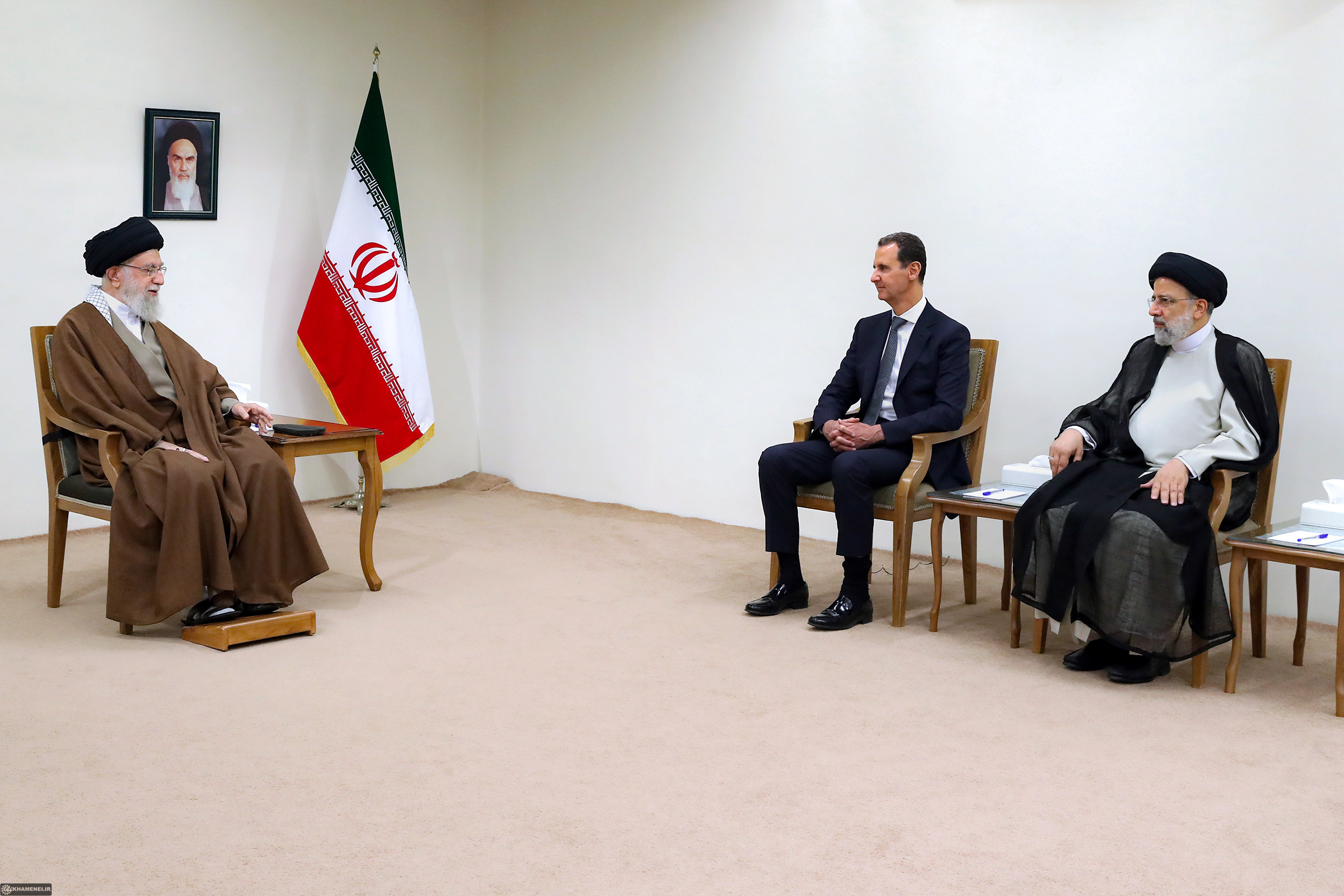
Iran's Supreme Leader Ayatollah Ali Khamenei and President Ebrahim Raisi meeting with Syrian President Bashar al-Assad on 8 May 2022.

Since the outbreak of the Syrian Civil War in 2011, Iran supported the Assad government in Syria until its fall. The Guardian claimed that in May 2011 the Iranian Revolutionary Guard increased its "level of technical support and personnel support" to strengthen Syria's "ability to deal with protesters," according to one diplomat in Damascus. Iranian Sr. Foreign Policy Advisor Ali Akbar Velayati declared, "Iran is not prepared to lose this golden counterweight [to Israel]."

Scholars have examined the strategic logic behind this support. In a 2019 study in International Affairs, Hassan Ahmadian and Payam Mohseni argue that deterrence, rather than sectarian or ideological motives, has been the primary driver of Iran's relationship with Syria; they describe Iran's posture in the Levant as "forward deterrence"—the projection of deterrent capacity beyond its own borders through Syria and allied groups such as Hezbollah in order to raise the costs of any confrontation with Israel or the United States. They characterise Iran's escalating wartime involvement as unfolding in four phases—building local militias, regionalising the effort by drawing in Hezbollah and transnational fighters such as the Fatemiyoun and Zeynabiyoun brigades, internationalising it by incorporating Russia to balance the United States, and a later phase of balancing against the United States, Turkey and Israel—each undertaken in reaction to the threatened defeat of its ally and the erosion of its deterrent position.

Iran reportedly assisted the Syrian government sending it riot control equipment, intelligence monitoring techniques and oil. It also agreed to fund a large military base at Latakia airport. The Daily Telegraph claimed in August 2011 that a former member of Syria's secret police reported "Iranian snipers" had been deployed in Syria to assist in the crackdown on protests. According to the U.S. government, Mohsen Chizari (the Quds Force's third-in-command) visited Syria to train security services to fight against the protestors.

In late June 2011, the Supreme Leader Ali Khamenei, stated in regards to the uprising: "In Syria, the hand of America and Israel is evident;" and in regards to the Syrian government: "Wherever a movement is Islamic, populist, and anti-American, we support it." Other Iranian officials have made similar pronouncements identifying the U.S. government as the origin of the uprising. However, in late August, the Iranian government gave its "first public sign" of concern over Syrian's handling of its crisis when foreign minister Ali Akbar Salehi issued a statement including the Syrian government in the list of states he urged to "answer to the demands of its people."

Syrian dissident and academic Murhaf Jouejati argued that Iran's contingency plan for its interests in Syria, in case the current pro-Iran government is overthrown, is to ethnically fragment the country in such a way that Iran could support an independent Alawite state.

Iran has been sending troops to fight in the Syrian Civil War. These troops have served in roles as advisors, security personnel, special forces, technicians, and frontline troops. Several high-ranking Iranian troops, including officers and generals, have been killed in combat in Syria. According to DW, Iran has been fighting against the factions in Syria, specifically the moderate and extremist factions, as well as I.S both directly and indirectly. According to some estimates, Iran controlled over 80,000 pro-Assad Shi'ite fighters in Syria.

Iran's President Hassan Rouhani stated on 3 August 2013, his inauguration day, that Iran's alliance with Syria would continue.

In June 2017, Iran launched missiles into Syria, targeting Islamic State fighters in retaliation for Tehran terror attacks, which killed 18 people. According to Reuters reports, Iran has persisted several times that all foreign military forces without legal permission should respect Syria's territorial integrity and vacate the country.

In January 2019, Iranian Vice President Eshaq Jahangiri and Syrian Prime Minister Imad Khamis signed 11 agreements and memoranda of understanding in Damascus, in order to bolster a "long-term strategic economic cooperation".

On May 8, 2022, Syrian President Bashar al-Assad arrived in Iran for discussions with Supreme Leader Ayatollah Ali Khamenei.

In September 2022, Israeli defense minister Benny Gantz said Iran is using proxy facilities in Syria to develop advanced missile systems and distribute them to its regional allies. Gantz revealed a map of facilities including an advanced underground facility in Masyaf that he described as significantly dangerous to the region.

During the Syrian Civil War, Iran provided oil to Syria at subsidized prices. In January 2023, Iranian officials reportedly told Syria they would no longer be able to buy Iranian oil at below market prices.

In May 2023, President Ebrahim Raisi went to Damascus, to be a first visit of an Iranian president since the emergence of civil war. However, the trip aimed to enhance cooperation in energy and electricity sectors.

=== Post-Assad regime (2024–present) ===
On 1 December 2024, Iranian Foreign Minister Abbas Araghchi left for a meeting with Assad in Damascus after rebel forces led by Hayat Tahrir al-Sham took over the Syrian city of Aleppo and pledged that Iran would support Assad's regime in his counteroffensive against the rebels. Araghchi was quoted as saying "We firmly support the Syrian army and government. ... The Syrian army will once again be victorious over these terrorist groups as in the past". On 2 December 2024, Iranian president Masoud Pezeshkian, spoke to Assad by phone and said that he had "confidence in Damascus' ability to prevail".

After rebels captured Damascus on December 8, 2024, the Iranian embassy was ransacked, with posters of Iran's leaders, such as Ayatollah Khamenei, Khomeini (who called Syria: “the golden ring of the resistance chain in the region.”), and figures like Hassan Nasrallah and Qassem Soleimani, torn down and scattered across the floors. Many Syrians blamed Iran and Hezbollah for supporting Assad's oppression. Iranian diplomats and Quds Force commanders fled the country. Iran called for negotiations with Syria's new rulers. The Syrian caretaker government was reportedly set to demand $300 billion in compensation from Iran in international courts for "the harm caused by Tehran’s 'criminal and arbitrary' policies to the Syrians and the Syrian infrastructure during its military alignment with its militias in favor of the regime of the ousted president. Bashar al-Assad."

The collapse of the Assad regime, a key ally of the Islamic Republic and a longstanding member of the Iranian-led "Axis of Resistance," has been described as a significant blow to the network and a crucial step toward its disintegration. Iran's foreign minister stated that "The resistance front has had a really hard year." Anwar Gargash, a senior Emirati diplomat had stated that "Iran’s deterrence thinking is really shattered by events in Gaza, by events in Lebanon and definitely by developments in Syria". The fall of Assad's regime led to unusual domestic criticism of Iran's regional strategy among skeptics who demanded to know why Iran had invested so much in the Axis of Resistance instead of within their own country. As of January 2025, Syria bans Iranian citizens and goods from entering its territory. Syrian officials have accused Iran of attempting to destabilize the new government by supporting the Assad loyalist insurgency, as well as extremists affiliated with the Islamic State.

During July 2025 Israeli forces arrested members of Iran's IRGC and seized weapons in southern Syria, claiming that they "posed a threat in the area".

== Cultural relations ==
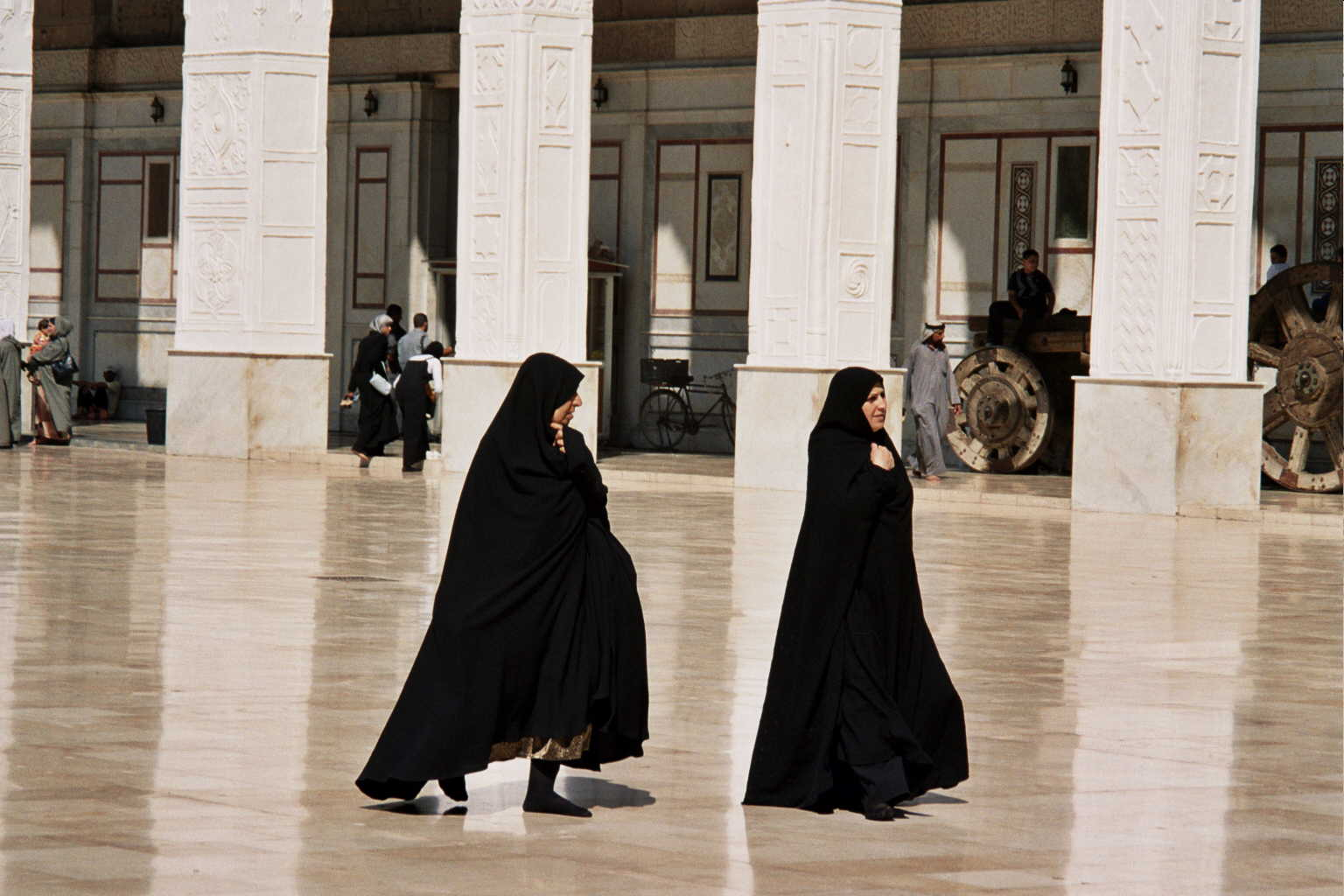
Iranian pilgrims in the Umayyad Mosque, Damascus

Iran opened its first cultural center in Syria in 1983, located in the Mazzeh neighborhood of Damascus. It was later moved into the heart of Damascus next to Martyrs' Square. The goals of the center include increasing cultural, scientific, and religious exchanges between the two countries, as well as being a forum for Iranian Islamic culture and Persian. The cultural center cooperates with four Syrian universities to encourage the teaching of the Persian language.

While Iran has shown an interest in spreading its culture to Syria, Syria has not been as motivated to spread its culture to Iran, as it is already common for Iranians to study Arabic. It was only in 2005 that Syria opened its first cultural center in Iran, which has become popular with Iranians seeking to improve their Arabic.

The largest cultural ties between Iran and Syria come from religious tourism. In 2008, 333,000 Iranians visited Syria as tourists, most of whom came to make religious pilgrimages to shrines like Sayida Zaynab and Sayida Ruqayya, both of which Iran has helped to renovate and expand. Likewise, Iran restored mausoleums in Raqqa (shrines of Uways al-Qarani and Ammar bin Yasir). According to Nadia von Maltzahn, the author of a book on cultural diplomacy between Syria and Iran, a large amount of religious tourism from Iran has given Syrians the idea that all Iranians are "religious, of modest background, and conservative, which did not persuade many Syrians to visit Iran."

== Position on territorial claims involving Iran ==
At an Arab League summit in May 2024, Syria backed the United Arab Emirates' claim to Abu Musa and the Greater and Lesser Tunbs over the Iranian one, drawing criticism in Iranian state media.

== See also ==
- Arab–Iran relations
- Axis of evil
- Iran-Iraq-Syria pipeline
- Iran–Lebanon relations
- Iranian involvement in the Syrian Civil War
- Iranians in Syria
- Shia crescent
- State Sponsors of Terrorism
- Hezbollah–Iran relations
