= Kurds in Lebanon =

Lebanese Kurds

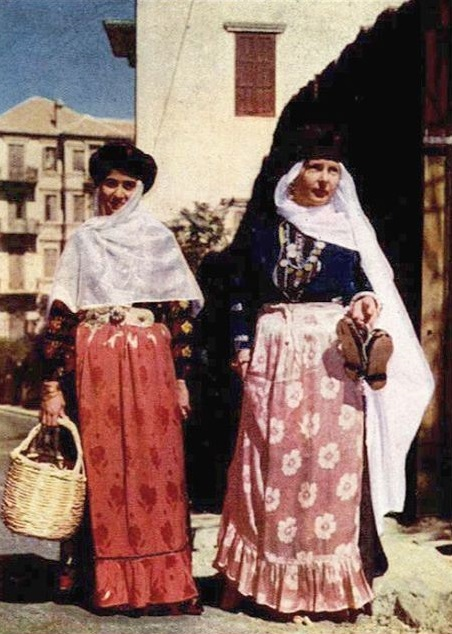
- Kurdish women in Beirut

Total population
- 75,000 - 100,000; 70,000 (estimate 2020)

Regions with significant populations
- Beirut

Languages
- Arabic and Kurmanji Kurdish

Religion
- Islam

Related ethnic groups
- Kurds

Kurds in Lebanon are people born in or residing in Lebanon who are of full or partial Kurdish origin. Estimates on the number of Kurds in Lebanon prior to 1985 were around 60,000. Today, there are tens of thousands of Kurds in Lebanon, mainly in Beirut.

== History ==
Most Kurds in Lebanon have come in recent decades, but the Kurdish community of Lebanon dates back to the 12th century, when Lebanon was ruled by the Kurdish Ayyubid dynasty. The Ottomans also sent loyal Kurdish families to modern-day Syria and Lebanon, where they got administrative roles. These Kurdish groups settled in and ruled many areas of Lebanon for a long period of time.

The Bekaa Valley in Lebanon, where many Syrian Kurdish refugees have taken shelter.

The first modern wave of Kurdish immigration to Lebanon was in the period of 1925-1950 when thousands of Kurds fled violence and poverty in Turkey. The second wave of Kurds entered in the late 1950s and early 1960s, most of whom fled from political repression in Syria and Turkey. During the early 1990s, the Lebanese government destroyed many squatter quarters in Beirut, where many Kurds lived, leading to the emigration of nearly one quarter of Lebanon's Kurdish population. Christian factions advocated for the expulsion of all Kurds and Palestinians from Lebanon.

During the Lebanese Civil War, Kurds fought for the Lebanese National Movement. Kurds were divided between Al-Mourabitoun and the Progressive Socialist Party.

== Current status ==
As of 2012, around 40% of all Kurds in Lebanon do not have Lebanese citizenship.

== Notable people ==
=== Politicians ===
- Saad Hariri, politician, business tycoon, Lebanese Prime Minister, and son of Rafic Hariri
- Kamal Jumblatt, 20th-century Lebanese politician and author; founder of the Progressive Socialist Party
- Taymur Jumblatt, Lebanese politician
- Walid Jumblatt, Lebanese politician

=== Sports ===
- Hassan Oumari, Footballer
- Joan Oumari, Footballer

=== Prominent families ===
- Jumblatt family
- Sa'b family

== See also ==
- Kurdish diaspora
- Turks in Lebanon
- Syrians in Lebanon
- Iranians in Lebanon
- Iraqis in Lebanon
- A Modern History of the Kurds by David McDowall
