= Iranians in Lebanon =

Total population
- 4,000 - 5,000

Regions with significant populations
- Beirut, Nabatieh

Languages
- Persian, Kurdish, Azerbaijani, Armenian and Arabic

Religion
- Shia Islam

Related ethnic groups
- Iranians, Arabs, Azeris, Armenians, Lebanese, Kurds, Turks

Iranians in Lebanon are people of Iranian background or descent residing in Lebanon. Some of them are Lebanese citizens while some are migrants or descendants born in Lebanon with Iranian heritage. Many Iranians in Lebanon live in Nabatieh. Many of the Iranians in Lebanon are carpet traders.

== Notable people ==
- Nour Ardakani (2001-), singer, ancestry from Ardakan
- Suheil Bushrui (1929–2015), professor and author, ancestry from Boshruyeh
- Masoud Boroumand (1928–2011), Iranian footballer
- Mostafa Chamran (1932–1981), Iranian physicist, politician, commander and guerrilla fighter
- Musa al-Sadr (1928–1978), Lebanese-Iranian philosopher and Shia religious leader

== See also ==
- Iran–Lebanon relations
- Iranian diaspora
- Lebanese people in Iran
- 2013 Iranian embassy bombing
- Kurds in Lebanon
