= Gold Apollo =

Taiwanese manufacturer of wireless paging systems

Gold Apollo Corporation Limited
- Native name: 金阿波羅股份有限公司
- Industry: Telecommunications
- Founded: October 1995
- Founder: Hsu Ching-kuang
- Headquarters: New Taipei City, Taiwan
- Area served: Worldwide
- Products: Pagers
- Owner: Hsu Ching-kuang
- Number of employees: 40
- Website: gapollo.com.tw

Gold Apollo Co., Ltd. is a Taiwanese electronics manufacturer of wireless paging systems compatible with POCSAG and FLEX.

== History ==
The company was founded by Taiwanese businessman Hsu Ching-kuang (許清光) in October 1995. Initially, the company only produced numeric pagers and focused on the domestic market. However, in 1999, when Taiwan's Chunghwa Telecom announced it would no longer issue pager numbers, the pager market collapsed overnight. In response, Gold Apollo began actively seeking to export its products abroad. In 2011, Gold Apollo became one of the few global experts in pagers, ranking as the largest pager company in the North American market and the second largest in Europe.

=== 2024 investigation ===
Between September and November 2024, the company was being investigated by the Shilin District Prosecutors Office for possible involvement in the 2024 Lebanon electronic device attacks, ultimately concluding that no Taiwanese people or organizations were involved in the attack on Hezbollah.

On 17 September 2024, some 5,000 Gold Apollo AR924 pagers in use by Hezbollah exploded simultaneously in Lebanon and parts of Syria, at around 3:30 pm local time.

A preliminary investigation by Taiwan's Ministry of Economic Affairs indicates that from 2022 to August 2024, Gold Apollo exported approximately 260,000 call devices from Taiwan. Between January and August 2024, 40,929 units were shipped, primarily to Europe and the United States. No incidents of explosions similar to those reported in the media have been associated with this batch of devices, and there are no records of direct exports to Lebanon.

In 2022, the Hungarian company BAC Consulting KFT had sought permission to manufacture the pagers and use Gold Apollo's trademark, paying Gold Apollo US$15 for each one. According to the seized shipping records and the contract between Gold Apollo and BAC Consulting KFT, BAC Consulting KFT had bought multiple batches of pagers from Gold Apollo three years before.

== See also ==
- Icom Incorporated
