= Lebanese Iranians =

Ethnic group

Lebanese people in Iran
Regions with significant populations
- Tehran, Qom

Languages
- Arabic, Persian

Religion
- predominantly Shia Islam, minorities of Sunni Islam, and Christianity (Greek Orthodox, Melkite Catholic, Maronite Catholic, Protestant)

Lebanese people in Iran refers to Lebanese living in Iran or Iranians of Lebanese descent. Lebanese people populate various regions and cities, but have especially settled in the city of Qom for religious studies as Qom has been an epicenter for Shia Muslims.

Lebanese are known to have been steadily migrating to the contemporary and former territories of Iran since the Safavid-era.

== History ==
Lebanese are known to have been migrating to contemporary Iran since the time of the Safavids (1501-1736). Nur-al-Din Karaki Ameli, a principal Lebanese Shia scholar, played a pivotal role at the Safavid court in opening a new way in the relations between secular rulers and Shi'ite clerics. Karaki furthermore played a crucial role in inaugurating a movement of emigration of Lebanese Shia scholars from Jabal Amel (then in Ottoman Syria) to Safavid Iran due to persecution during the reign of the first two Safavid kings (shahs), namely Ismail I (r. 1501–24) and Tahmasp I (r. 1524–76), who were at pains to introduce Shi'ism on the state-level throughout their vast dominions. The Al-Sadr family are a prominent family who migrated from Lebanon to Iran. At the beginning of the Safavid era, Twelver Shi'ism was imported into Iran largely from Mount Lebanon and Syria.

== Notable Iranians of Lebanese descent ==
- Nur-al-Din Karaki ʿĀmeli
- Moḥammad b. Ḥasan Ḥorr ʿĀmeli
- Bahāʾ al-dīn al-ʿĀmilī
- Musa al-Sadr

== See also ==
- Iran–Lebanon relations
- Arab diaspora
- Lebanese diaspora
- Iranian Arabs
- Safavid conversion of Iran to Shia Islam
- Iranians in Lebanon
- Shia Islam in Lebanon
- Shia Islam in Iran
