= Icom Incorporated =

Radio equipment manufacturer

ICOM Inc.
- Native name: アイコム株式会社
- Type: Public KK
- Traded as: TYO: 6820
- ISIN: JP3101400004
- Industry: Electronics
- Founded: April 1954; 72 years ago
- Founder: Tokuzo Inoue
- Headquarters: Hirano, Osaka, Japan
- Area served: Worldwide
- Key people: Tokuzo Inoue (Chairman and CEO); Masataka Harima (President)
- Products: Radio communications equipment; Wireless LAN and SIP telephone equipment
- Revenue: ▲JPY 24.8 billion (FY 2017) (US$ 234 million) (FY 2017)
- Net income: ▲JPY 626 million (FY 2017) (US$ 5.8 million) (FY 2017)
- Number of employees: 1,080 (consolidated, as of March 31, 2018)
- Website: Official website

Icom Inc. (アイコム株式会社, Aikomu Kabushiki-gaisha) is a Japanese manufacturer of radio transmitting and receiving equipment, founded in 1954 by Tokuzo Inoue with the company's original name being "Inoue". Its products now include equipment for radio amateurs, pilots, maritime applications, land mobile professional applications, and radio scanner enthusiasts.

Headquartered in Osaka, Japan, Icom has branch offices in the United States (in Kirkland, Washington), Canada (in Delta, British Columbia), Australia (Melbourne, Victoria), New Zealand (Auckland), the United Kingdom (Kent, England), France (Toulouse), Germany (Bad Soden), Spain (Barcelona) and China (Beijing).

== Protocols ==
=== IDAS ===
IDAS is Icom's implementation of the NXDN protocol for two-way digital radio products intended for commercial Private Land Mobile Radio (PLMR) and low-end public safety communications systems. NXDN is a Common Air Interface (CAI) technical standard for mobile communications. It was developed jointly by Icom and Kenwood Corporation.

=== D-STAR ===
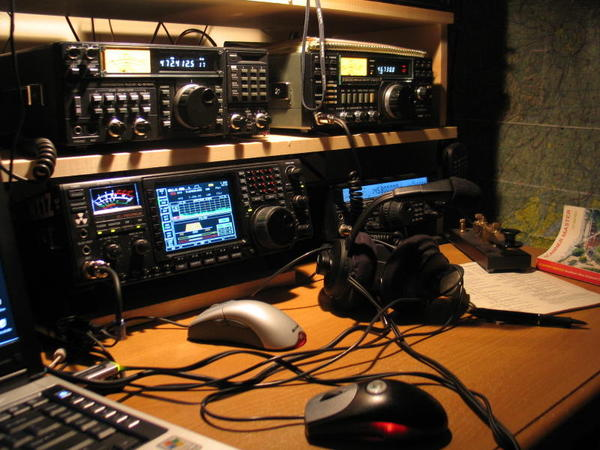
An amateur radio station comprising three Icom radios.

The D-STAR open radio system was developed by Icom based on digital radio protocols developed by the Japan Amateur Radio League and funded by the Ministry of Posts and Telecommunications. This system is designed to provide advanced voice and data communications over amateur radio using open standards.

== Products ==
Icom manufactures two way radios and receivers for use in marine applications, Airband, amateur radio applications, land mobile applications, and FRS / GMRS applications. Some radios made by Icom are compatible with Motorola and SmarTrunk trunking systems.

== IC-V82 ==
The Icom IC-V82 is a VHF handheld transceiver with coverage in the two-meter band (144–146 MHz) and a maximum output power of 7 watts. It was manufactured and sold by Icom from 2004 to 2014. Following its discontinuation, Icom issued an advisory warning about counterfeit radios, including the IC-V82. In October 2018, the company issued a cease-and-desist order against a Chinese manufacturer suspected of producing counterfeit Icom products; it also noted that this was not the first time it had taken such steps.

In June 2022, United Against Nuclear Iran, a U.S. advocacy organization, identified the Icom IC-V82 as being used by Hezbollah, a U.S. designated Foreign Terrorist Organization. It sent a letter to Icom outlining its concerns about the radios' dual-use capability (analog+digital) and regarding Icom's business ties to Power Group (Icom's representatives in Lebanon) and Faza Gostrar, which claims to be the "Official ICOM representative in Iran".

Many of the devices purchased by Hezbollah that subsequently exploded in the 2024 Lebanon radio device explosions, killing at least 25 people and wounding over 708, were reported as being IC-V82s. Icom opened an investigation into the case on 19 September 2024, while a sales executive at the company's U.S. subsidiary said the radios involved appeared to be counterfeit units.

== See also ==
- Gold Apollo
- Targeted killing by Israel
- List of radios – List of specific models of radios
