= 2013 Iranian embassy bombing in Beirut =

Sunni Islamist terror bombing in Lebanon

Iranian embassy bombings
- Part of Syrian civil war spillover in Lebanon
- Location of Beirut in Lebanon
- Location: 33°51′22″N 35°29′22″E; Jinah, Beirut, Lebanon
- Date: 19 November 2013 (EET)
- Target: Iranian embassy, Beirut
- Attack type: Suicide bomber, car bomb
- Deaths: 23
- Injuries: At least 160
- Perpetrators: Abdullah Azzam Brigades (al-Qaeda affiliate); General Intelligence Presidency (Hezbollah claim)

The 2013 Iranian embassy bombing in Beirut was a double suicide bombing in front of the Iranian embassy in Beirut, Lebanon on 19 November 2013. The two bombings resulted in 23 deaths and injured at least 160 others.

== Background ==
The bombings were seen as part of the spillover of the Syrian civil war, in which Hezbollah and Iran have supported the Syrian government, while the Abdullah Azzam Brigades have fought against the Syrian government. On the same day as the bombing, Syrian government forces seized the town of Qarah from rebel fighters in an opening action in the Battle of Qalamoun.

The Syrian government effort at the time, with the strong support of Hezbollah fighters, to eliminate the rebel stronghold in Qalamoun, a region along the Lebanese border with strong ties to the Lebanese Sunni town of Arsal, was expected by some analysts to raise tensions within Lebanon.

== Bombings ==
The area immediately outside the embassy gates was hit by two consecutive blasts. The first was reported to be carried out by a bomber either on a motorcycle or on foot. After people had rushed to the scene, a 4x4 vehicle two buildings away from the embassy blew up in a second, deadlier explosion. The two blasts occurred within 2 minutes of each other. Six buildings were reported to have been damaged. The bombs destroyed some building fronts and severely damaged the embassy gates, but caused only fairly minor damage to the embassy building.

=== Victims ===
According to Lebanon's Health Ministry at least 23 people were killed and 147 wounded. Iranian cultural attaché Ebrahim Ansari was among the dead, with five Iranian security personnel wounded. Ansari and the Iranian ambassador Ghazanfar Roknabadi were scheduled to leave the embassy to attend a meeting at the Ministry of Culture at around the time when the bombs went off. The embassy's head of security, a Lebanese national, was also killed in the blast.

== Claims of responsibility ==
The Abdullah Azzam Brigades, a Sunni Islamist militant group, claimed responsibility for the attack. The group declared that its attacks against Iran would continue until Iran "withdraws its forces from Syria". The group has made false claims in the past. On 31 December, sources confirmed that Lebanese authorities have captured Majid bin Mohammad al-Majid, the Saudi leader of the Abdullah Azzam Brigades.

Leader of Hezbollah Hassan Nasrallah said in December television interview that the attack was "linked to the Saudi intelligence services" because of "Saudi Arabia's rage against Iran over (Saudi Arabia's) failure" in Syria.

== Reactions ==
Domestic

Hezbollah held a public funeral and rally in Beirut the day after the attack. Hezbollah deputy leader Naim Qassem vowed to continue support for the Syrian government in saying the attacks in Lebanon were "inevitable pains on the road to victory", while mourners chanted "Death to America, Israel, and the takfiris!"

Regional

Iranian foreign ministry spokeswoman Marzieh Afkham blamed Israel for the attack, calling it "an inhuman crime and spiteful act done by Zionists and their mercenaries". Israel denied any involvement.

Saudi Arabia called on all its citizens to leave the country.

Other states and entities

The attacks were condemned by the United Nations Security Council, China, France, Syria, the United Kingdom and the United States. Tom Fletcher, the British ambassador to Beirut, personally donated blood and expressed solidarity with those affected.

== See also ==
- Iran–Lebanon relations
- List of attacks on diplomatic missions
- 1983 United States embassy bombing
- Iranians in Lebanon
- Ghazanfar Roknabadi
