= Kim Ghattas =

Lebanese journalist (born 1977)

- Ghattas in 2026
- Born: 1977 (age 48–49); Beirut, Lebanon
- Education: American University of Beirut
- Occupations: Author; journalist
- Website: kimghattas.com

Kim Ghattas (English: /ˈxætæs/; born 1977) is a Lebanese journalist based in Beirut who writes for The Atlantic. Previously, she covered the US State Department for the BBC. She is a scholar at the Carnegie Endowment for International Peace and the author of Black Wave: Saudi Arabia, Iran, and the Forty-Year Rivalry That Unraveled Culture, Religion, and Collective Memory in the Middle East, which The New York Times recognized as one of the "100 Notable Books of 2020." She is currently a writer for The Atlantic and a contributing editor to the Financial Times.

== Life ==
Ghattas was raised Christian in Lebanon during the 1975–1990 civil war. She attended the American University of Beirut, studying political science, while also interning at an English-language newspaper in Beirut. She then worked for the Financial Times and the BBC from Beirut. In early 2008, she moved to Washington, D.C. to take up a BBC post covering the US State Department.

In 2013, Ghattas wrote a book titled The Secretary: A Journey with Hillary Clinton from Beirut to the Heart of American Power about her travels with Hillary Clinton during Clinton's tenure as Secretary of State. She later covered Clinton's 2016 presidential campaign for the BBC. Ghattas's second book, Black Wave: Saudi Arabia, Iran, and the Forty-Year Rivalry That Unraveled Culture, Religion, and Collective Memory in the Middle East, is a post-1979 history of the Middle East.

== Works ==
- The Secretary: A Journey with Hillary Clinton from Beirut to the Heart of American Power, Henry Holt and Company, 2013. ISBN 9780805095111
- Black Wave: Saudi Arabia, Iran, and the Forty-Year Rivalry That Unraveled Culture, Religion, and Collective Memory in the Middle East, Henry Holt and Company, 2020. ISBN 9781250131201
- The Best Kind of American: A True Story of Murder, War, and America's Undoing in the Middle East, Henry Holt and Company, 2026. ISBN 9781250896803
