= Hassan Ahmadian =

Iranian political scientist (born 20th century)

Hassan Ahmadian (Persian: حسن احمدیان) is an Iranian political scientist who studies Middle Eastern politics. He is an associate professor of Middle East and North Africa studies at the University of Tehran's Faculty of World Studies, and earlier held a postdoctoral fellowship with the Iran Project at Harvard University's Belfer Center for Science and International Affairs. His research covers Iran's foreign and regional policy, the Iran–Saudi rivalry, and security in the Middle East.

He is also known in the Arab world for his commentary on Al Jazeera Arabic; his appearances during the 2025 and 2026 confrontations between Iran and Israel attracted wider attention.

== Education ==
Ahmadian took a bachelor's degree in philosophy at the University of Tabriz (2002–2006). He moved to the University of Tehran for graduate study, completing a master's degree in Middle East and North Africa area studies in 2010 and a doctorate in the same field in 2014. Beginning in 2017 he carried out postdoctoral research on Iranian foreign policy at Harvard University.

== Academic career ==
Ahmadian teaches at the Faculty of World Studies of the University of Tehran, where he is an associate professor; earlier profiles give his rank as assistant professor. Much of his work concerns Iran's regional strategy and its dealings with neighbouring states, including Iranian policy toward Syria, Iraq and Saudi Arabia.

From about 2018 to 2019 he was a postdoctoral research fellow with the Iran Project at the Belfer Center for Science and International Affairs, part of the Harvard Kennedy School, working with the political scientist Payam Mohseni. He has also been linked to Harvard's Project on Shi'ism and Global Affairs at the Weatherhead Center for International Affairs and to Tehran-based research centres; at the Center for Middle East Strategic Studies he is listed as scientific supervisor of its Saudi Arabia Society and Politics Studies Group, though by late 2026 Al Jazeera's own guest bylines were describing him as the center's deputy director. He spoke at the 2023 Doha Forum. In November 2026 he taught the session on Iran's military doctrine for the Institute for Peace & Diplomacy's paid online "Iran Strategy Course" for professionals.

His peer-reviewed articles have appeared in International Affairs, Survival, The International Spectator and the Journal of Balkan and Near Eastern Studies. As of late October 2026 his University of Tehran research profile recorded 411 citations to his work and an h-index of 11; his most cited paper is a 2019 study of Iran's strategy in Syria, written with Mohseni.

== Commentary and public profile ==
Ahmadian also works as a political commentator. He has contributed opinion pieces to Al Jazeera English and Foreign Policy, and for several years wrote a column for Al-Monitor. International outlets interview him on Iranian affairs, including CNN's Amanpour & Company and its PBS broadcast, the Christian Science Monitor and Middle East Eye.

His profile grew during the 2025 and 2026 hostilities between Iran and Israel, when he appeared on Al Jazeera Arabic and argued Iranian positions in on-air debates with other panellists. Drop Site News wrote that his appearances had made him "one of the most prominent Iranian commentators in the Islamic world", and Iranian and Egyptian outlets ran profiles of him. After Iran offered in October 2026 to mediate between Saudi Arabia and the Houthis, Ahmadian argued on Al Jazeera's Current Debate programme that Tehran's relationship with the group was one of alliance and coordination rather than command, and that ongoing contact between them could help de-escalate the standoff; Tim Constantine, deputy editor of The Washington Times, countered on the same programme that an offer of mediation from a government that armed and advised the Houthis was like an arsonist volunteering to help put out his own fire. By late 2026 Al Jazeera English's news coverage, not just its opinion pages, was citing his analysis directly: a 7 November explainer on whether the United States would strike Iran's nuclear sites again quoted a post of his on X describing Iran's strategy as having kept Trump "in the fog" through what he called cognitive warfare. The appearances also brought criticism. According to the Middle East Media Research Institute (MEMRI), some Arab journalists accused Al Jazeera of using commentators such as Ahmadian to relay Iranian government messaging.

== Selected publications ==
- Ahmadian, Hassan; Mohseni, Payam (2019). "Iran's Syria strategy: the evolution of deterrence". International Affairs. 95 (2): 341–364. doi:10.1093/ia/iiy271.
- Ahmadian, Hassan; Mohseni, Payam (2021). "From détente to containment: the emergence of Iran's new Saudi strategy". International Affairs. 97 (3): 779–799. doi:10.1093/ia/iiab014.
- Ahmadian, Hassan (2018). "Iran and Saudi Arabia in the age of Trump". Survival. 60 (2): 133–150. doi:10.1080/00396338.2018.1448579.
- Ahmadian, Hassan (2021). "Dignity, wisdom and expediency: how ideational factors shape Iran's foreign policy". The International Spectator. 56 (4): 33–48. doi:10.1080/03932729.2021.1991118.
- Ahmadian, Hassan (2021). "Iran and the new geopolitics of the Middle East: in search of equilibrium". Journal of Balkan and Near Eastern Studies. 23 (3): 458–472. doi:10.1080/19448953.2021.1888247.
