= Alinco =

Japanese electronics manufacturer

- Company type: Public
- ISIN: JP3126100001
- Industry: Radio manufacturing
- Founded: July 4, 1970; 55 years ago
- Founder: Yusaku Inoue
- Headquarters: Japan, Osaka
- Website: Official website

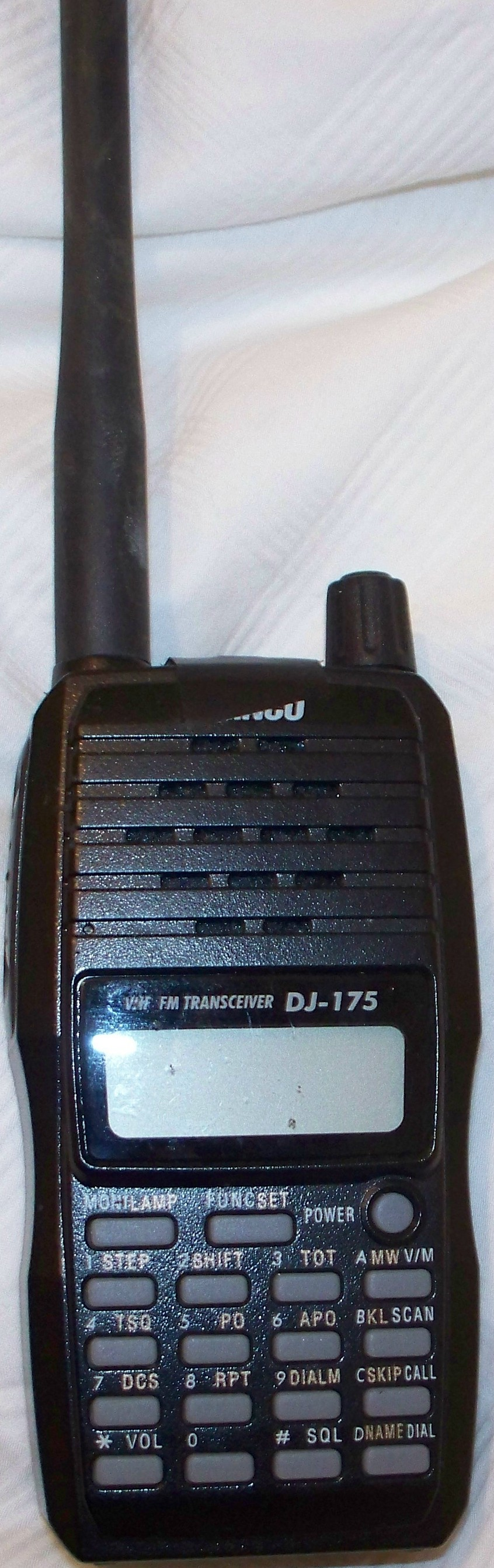
An Alinco 2-meter, amateur radio handheld transceiver.

Alinco ( Alinco Inc.) (TYO: 5933) is a Japanese manufacturer of radio and amplification equipment, and in the Japanese market, metal products, construction equipment, and exercise equipment.

== Corporate affairs ==
Established in 1970 in Osaka, Japan, it also has offices in Tokyo, Takatsuki, manufacturing facilities in Toyama and Hyōgo in Japan, and one in Suzhou, China.

== See also ==
- List of amateur radio transceivers § Alinco
