= Mohammad Reza Raouf Sheibani =

Iranian diplomat

Mohammad Reza Raouf Sheibani (Persian: محمدرضا رؤوف شیبانی) is a long time diplomat and former senior official of the Ministry of Foreign Affairs of Iran. He has served as an Iranian ambassador to several countries around the Middle East and Europe, mainly positioned in Syria, where he was appointed in 2025 as Iran's special envoy for Syrian affairs. In early 2026, he was appointed as Iran's ambassador to Lebanon. As of 2026 his is under US sanctions based on Executive Order 13224.

== Early life and education ==
According to sources, Sheibani, joined Iran's diplomatic service and rose through the ranks of the Ministry of Foreign Affairs, specializing in Middle Eastern and regional diplomacy.

== Diplomatic career ==
Sheibani has had a long career as a diplomat for Iran. He served as ambassador to Cyprus from 1991 to 1995, Egypt from 2004 to 2005, Lebanon from 2005 to 2009, and Syria from 2011 to 2016. He also worked as Iran's Deputy Foreign Minister from 2009 to 2011, helping to shape regional policy and diplomatic plans. After finishing his ambassador roles, he continued working on foreign policy as an adviser and academic, including work with the Institute for Political and International Studies (IPIS), which is part of Iran's Ministry of Foreign Affairs. In January 2026 he was appointed as Iran's ambassador to Lebanon.

== Expulsion ==
On 24 March 2026, Lebanon’s foreign ministry declared him persona non grata, ordering him to leave by 29 March over Iran’s financial and military support for Hezbollah. By 29 March, he had yet to depart, defying the order. The move sparked opposition from Hezbollah and led to a cabinet boycott by its ministers and allies. According to L'Orient–Le Jour, Sheibani never presented credentials before these events, meaning he was not officially sworn in or accredited under the Vienna Convention.

== Sanctions ==
In May 2026, along with Hezbollah MP and other Lebanese officials, the US government sanctioned Sheibani for his links and support of Hezbollah. According to the report: "By supporting the terrorist group, these individuals further the Iranian regime's malicious agenda in Lebanon and actively obstruct the path to peace and recovery for the Lebanese people,".

== See also ==
- Foreign relations of Iran
- Iran–Syria relations
- Ministry of Foreign Affairs of Iran
