= Interference =

Interference is the act of interfering, invading, or poaching. Interference may also refer to:

== Communications ==
- Interference (communication), anything which alters, modifies, or disrupts a message
- Adjacent-channel interference, caused by extraneous power from a signal in an adjacent channel
- Co-channel interference, also known as crosstalk
- Electromagnetic interference, disturbance that affects an electrical circuit
- Inter-carrier interference, caused by Doppler shift in OFDM modulation
- Intersymbol interference, distortion caused by successive symbols

== Entertainment ==
- Interference (band), an Irish band which formed in 1984
- Interference (Crease album), 1995
- Interference (Cubanate album), 1998
- Interference (film), Paramount's first all-talking film
- "Interference" (Prison Break episode), a 2007 episode
- Interference – Book One, a 1999 Doctor Who novel by Lawrence Miles
- Interference – Book Two, a 1999 Doctor Who novel by Lawrence Miles
- Interference (novel), a 2019 novel by Sue Burke

== Science ==
=== Biology ===
- Crossover interference, non-random placement of crossovers with respect to each other during meiosis
- RNA interference, a process within living cells that moderates the activity of their genes
- Vaccine interference, interaction between two or more vaccines mixed in the same formulation
- Viral interference, one viral infection inhibiting another

=== Physics ===
- Interference engine
- Interference fit, in engineering
- Interference lithography, in optics
- Thin-film interference, in optics
- Wave interference, in physics

=== Other ===
- Interference ripples, in geology
- Interference theory, in psychology

== Sports ==
- Basket interference, in basketball
- Pass interference, a penalty in American football and Canadian Football
- Interference (baseball), changing the course of play from what is expected
- Interference (ice hockey)

== Other uses ==
- Hybrid warfare
- Interference (chess)
- Interference proceeding, in U.S. patent law
- Interfering thread nut, a type of locknut
- Statistical interference, in statistics
- Interference: How Organized Crime Influences Professional Football, a 1989 non-fiction book by journalist Dan Moldea

== See also ==
- Intervention (disambiguation)
