= 2024 in Israel =

- Decades: 2000s; 2010s; 2020s
- See also: History of Israel; Timeline of Israeli history; List of years in Israel

Events of the year 2024 in Israel.

== Incumbents ==
- President of Israel – Isaac Herzog
- Prime Minister of Israel – Benjamin Netanyahu
- President of the Supreme Court – Uzi Vogelman (until 1 October), Yitzhak Amit (since 1 October)
- Chief of General Staff – Herzi Halevi
- Government of Israel – Thirty-seventh government of Israel

== Ongoing ==
- Gaza war
- 2024 Israeli military operation in the West Bank
- Israeli invasion of the Gaza Strip
- Gaza war protests in Israel
- 2024 Israeli protests
- Israeli blockade of aid delivery to the Gaza Strip
- Israel–Hezbollah conflict (2023–present)
- Iran–Israel proxy conflict
- 2024 Iran–Israel conflict
- 2024 Israeli invasion of Lebanon
- Trial of Benjamin Netanyahu
- Israeli civil investigation committee of the 2023 October 7 Hamas attack
- Disappearance of Heimnot Kassau (פרשת היעלמותה של היימנוט קסאו)

== Events ==
=== January ===
- 1 January –
  - Hamas fires a barrage of at least 27 rockets shortly after midnight at cities and towns in central and southern Israel.
  - The Supreme Court of Israel strikes down the reasonableness limitation law, part of the government's contentious judicial reform, for the first time in the country's history annulling one of the country's quasi-constitutional Basic Laws in a controversial decision splitting the court 8-7.
- 2 January – Israel conducts an airstrike in the Dahieh neighborhood of Beirut, Lebanon, resulting in the assassination of Saleh al-Arouri, the deputy chairman of the Hamas political bureau.
- 3 January – The Supreme Court delays the implementation of an amendment to a Basic Law that would protect the prime minister from being forced to recuse himself if ordered to do so by the attorney general or the Supreme Court, by postponing implementation until after the next Knesset is elected, so that it does not apply retroactively to incumbent Prime Minister Benjamin Netanyahu, who is on trial for several charges of corruption.
- 7 January – An Arab Israeli man is killed and a woman is critically injured by a Palestinian gunman north of Jerusalem.
- 8 January – Wissam al-Tawil, the deputy commander of Hezbollah's Redwan Force, in Majdel Selm, Lebanon is killed in a presumed Israeli airstrike.
- 9 January – Hezbollah launches a drone attack on the Northern Command headquarters in Safed, marking its deepest incursion into Israeli territory since the outbreak of hostilities. In retaliation, Israel kills Ali Hussein Barji, a senior Hezbollah commander responsible for dozens of explosive drone attacks on northern Israel in recent months.
- 11 January – South Africa v. Israel (Genocide Convention): A two-day public hearing begins at the Peace Palace in The Hague regarding alleged violations by Israel of its obligations under the 1948 Genocide Convention and international law in relation to Palestinians in the Gaza Strip.
- 14 January –
  - Approximately 120,000 people attend the start of a 24-hour rally in Tel Aviv's Hostages Square to mark 100 days since the hostages were kidnapped into Gaza during the Hamas-led attack in southern Israel on 7 October.
  - An Israeli woman and her son are killed by an anti-tank guided missile which penetrated their home in Yuval in the Galilee near the Israel-Lebanon border.
- 15 January – A woman is killed and 17 are severely injured in a stabbing and vehicle ramming attack in Ra'anana by two Palestinian illegal workers from Hebron.
- 22 January – In the single deadliest incident for the Israel Defense Forces (IDF) since the start of Israel's ground offensive in Gaza, 21 soldiers are killed after coming under attack in the southern Gaza Strip, triggering a blast that collapsed two buildings with soldiers inside them.
- 26 January – In the case brought by South Africa, the International Court of Justice issues a preliminary order calling on Israel to "take all measures within its power" to prevent genocide and prevent and punish incitement to genocide in Gaza and allow in more humanitarian aid, while taking more measures to protect Palestinians and to report back in one month, but is not required to end military operations.
- 31 January – Yuval Freilich wins the men's gold medal in fencing in Qatar, a country that does not have ties with Israel, while wearing a shirt with the words "Am Yisrael Chai" (the people of Israel live) embossed in Hebrew on the Israeli flag.

=== February ===
- 1 February – U.S. President Joe Biden signs an executive order imposing sanctions on four Israeli settlers in the West Bank who are implicated in acts of violence against Palestinians in the region.
- 3 February – Sharon Kantor wins the gold medal at the iQFOiL World Championships in the Canary Islands, securing her spot on the Israeli team to the 2024 Paris Olympics, while team-mate Katy Spychakov wins the bronze medal.
- 4 February – Most of Israel experiences 14 continuous days of rainfall for the first time in 30 years, raising the water level of the Sea of Galilee by 26 centimeters (10.2 inches).
- 6 February – Argentinian President Javier Milei makes his first overseas state visit to Israel to express support for Israel in its Gaza war and announces that he will move Argentina’s embassy to Jerusalem.
- 10 February – The IDF announces that it discovered a Hamas data center under UNRWA's Gaza Strip headquarters.
- 11 February – Hamas announces the death of two Israeli hostages and says that eight others have been seriously injured by Israeli airstrikes on the Gaza Strip in the past 96 hours.
- 12 February – Israeli special forces conduct a raid on a building in Rafah in southern Gaza, rescuing two Israeli-Argentinians who were kidnapped from Kibbutz Nir Yitzhak on 7 October by Hamas.
- 14 February –
  - The Hostages and Missing Families Forum files a complaint of war crimes against the leadership of Hamas at the International Criminal Court.
  - A rocket attack from Lebanon kills one civilian and injures eight others in Safed. Several rockets also hit the headquarters of the IDF's Northern Command.
- 16 February –
  - Two people are killed and four others are injured in a mass shooting at a bus station at Re'em Junction near Kiryat Malachi. The perpetrator is killed by an off-duty IDF reservist.
- 18 February –
  - The Cabinet of Israel adopts a resolution opposing unilateral recognition of a Palestinian state, following comments from France and the United Kingdom that they were considering such a move.
  - Channel 12 reports that Prime Minister Benjamin Netanyahu will restrict Palestinian citizens of Israel's access to the al-Aqsa Mosque in Jerusalem during the month of Ramadan due to security concerns.
- 19 February – Foreign Minister Israel Katz says that Brazilian president Luiz Inácio Lula da Silva is persona non grata in Israel until he retracts his comments likening the war between Israel and Hamas to the Holocaust.
- 22 February – One Israeli is killed and 10 others severely injured in a shooting attack by three Palestinians on a Highway 1 checkpoint near Ma'ale Adumim in the West Bank.
- 23 February – U.S. Secretary of State Antony Blinken declares that Israeli settlements in the West Bank are illegal under international law, overturning a policy instated under former U.S. President Donald Trump.
- 25 February – Two Hezbollah members are killed by an Israeli strike in al-Qusayr, Syria.
- 26 February – The Israeli Air Force announces the establishment of a new department focused on monitoring the Iranian Armed Forces.
- 27 February – Municipal elections, originally scheduled for October 2023, take place amidst the ongoing Gaza war.

=== March ===
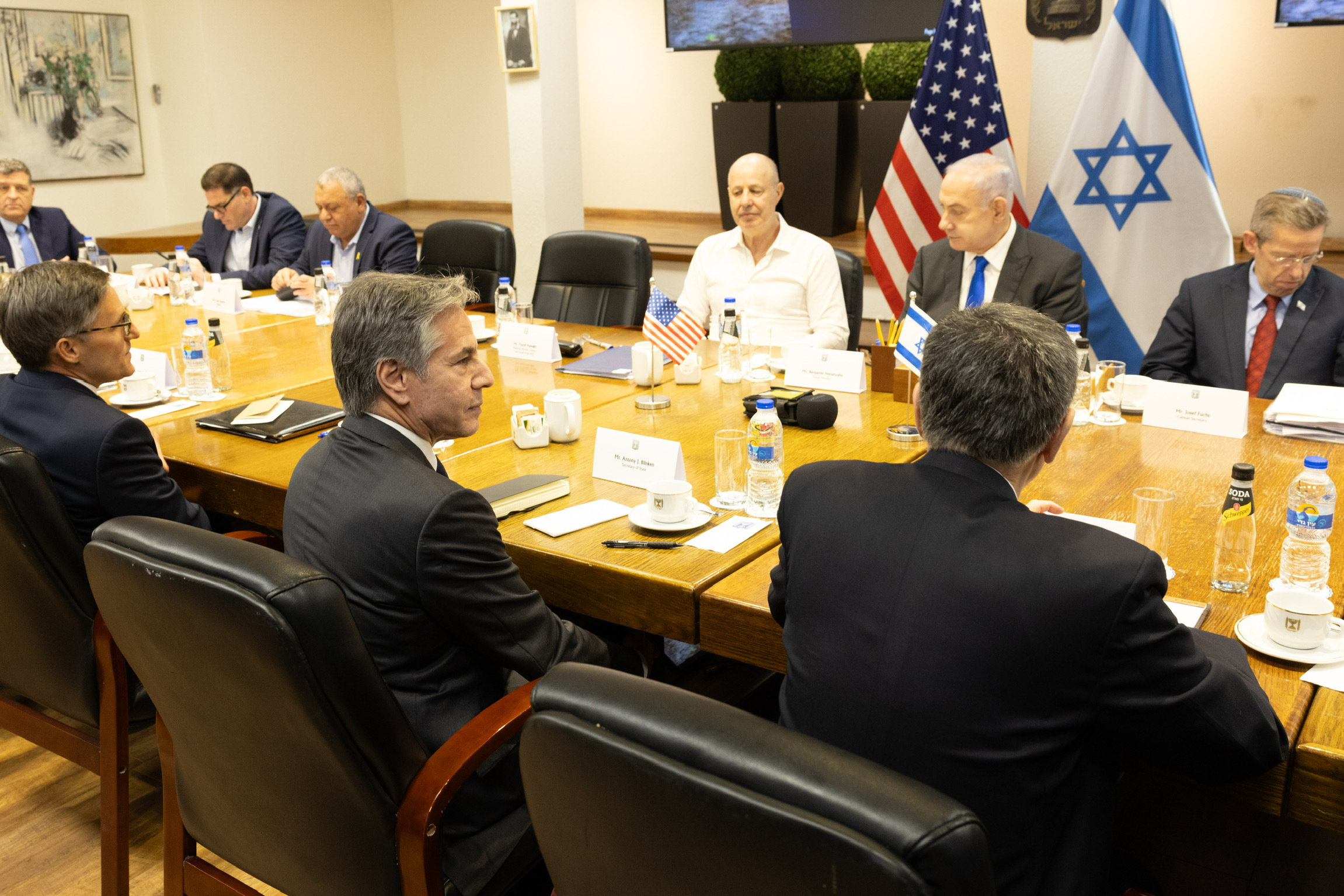
US Secretary of State Antony Blinken with Israeli Prime Minister Benjamin Netanyahu and the Israeli war cabinet in Tel Aviv, 22 March 2024

- 19 March – Israel announces the death of senior Hamas military leader Marwan Issa, following an airstrike on a tunnel complex the previous week, making him the highest ranking Hamas official killed in the war yet.
- 21 March – The Islamic Resistance in Iraq launches drone attacks on Kiryat Shmona Airport and Ben Gurion Airport.
- 25 March – The UN Security Council passes resolution calling for an immediate ceasefire in Gaza, from which the US abstains.
- 26 March –
  - Israeli airstrikes in Syria kills one Quds Force officer and 15 other militants.
  - Israeli airstrikes against Hezbollah targets near the towns of Ras Baalbek and Hermel in Baalbek-Hermel Governorate, Lebanon kills at least three Hezbollah members.
- 28 March – The International Court of Justice, in a unanimous decision, orders Israel to allow humanitarian aid to enter the Gaza Strip unimpeded, warning that famine is already occurring.
- 29 March – An Israeli airstrike targeting Aleppo International Airport kills 36 Syrian soldiers and six Hezbollah fighters. The incident marks the deadliest Israeli attack on Syria since 2021.

=== April ===
- 1 April –
  - The Islamic Resistance in Iraq launches three drones at Eilat, damaging a building, but not causing injuries.
  - An Israeli airstrike targeting the Iranian embassy in Damascus kills eight members of the Islamic Revolutionary Guard Corps, including brigadier general Mohammad Reza Zahedi.
  - The Israeli government says that it will ban Al Jazeera from broadcasting in its territory.
- 7 April – Siege of Khan Yunis: Israel withdraws all ground forces from the southern Gaza Strip, including Khan Yunis, leaving just one IDF brigade, the 933rd Nahal Brigade, remaining in the enclave.
- 8 April – Prime Minister Benjamin Netanyahu orders an invasion of Rafah in the southern Gaza Strip with a date "being set" for the ground offensive.
- 10 April – An Israeli airstrike kills three sons of Hamas Chairman Ismail Haniyeh.
- 11 April – U.S. President Joe Biden announces that Iran is threatening to launch a significant attack against Israel and promises U.S. support to Israel.
- 12 April –
  - Israel prepares for a direct attack from Iran on southern or northern Israel as soon as the next 24 to 48 hours. A person briefed by the Iranian leadership says that while plans to attack are being discussed, no final decision has been made.
  - The United States restricts travel for its embassy personnel in Israel amid fears of an attack by Iran.
  - The British government advises against all travel to Israel and Palestinian territories due to the imminent threat of an Iranian attack.
  - Hezbollah launches dozens of rockets into northern Israel. The militant group says that the missile barrage targeted IDF artillery positions. No casualties are reported.
- 13 April –
  - The U.S. Navy deploys units to Middle East positions to protect Israel against incoming missiles.
  - United States intelligence reports Iran moving drones and missiles internally ahead of a potential attack.
  - Australian airline Qantas pauses its non-stop Perth-London route due to expected Iranian attack against Israel.
  - Iranian seizure of the MSC Aries: Iran seizes the MSC Aries, a Portuguese-registered, Madeira-flagged container ship owned by Zodiac Maritime of Israeli Eyal Ofer.
  - The body of Israeli teenager Benjamin Achimeir is found in the West Bank a day after he went missing, sparking clashes between settlers and Palestinians.
  - Iran and other militant groups launch Operation True Promise, unleashing between 400 and 500 drones and cruise missiles at Israel from Iraq, Syria, southern Lebanon, and Yemen, in response to the attack on its consulate in Damascus.
- 16 April –
  - Two Palestinians killed in a breakout of Israeli settler attacks in Aqraba in revenge for the murder of Benjamin Achimeir amid escalating ethnoreligious violence in the West Bank.
  - The IDF conducts an airstrike and assassinates Ismail Yusuf Baz, the commander of Hezbollah's coastal sector in Lebanon.
- 19 April –
  - Missiles believed to be fired by the IDF allegedly hit sites near the Iranian city of Isfahan, sites in Iraq and radar sites in Syria.
  - The Department of Foreign Affairs and Trade of Australia tells its citizens to leave Israel, citing a high threat of military reprisals and terrorist attacks.
- 22 April –
  - The head of the Military Intelligence Directorate, Aharon Haliva, resigns for failing to prevent the Hamas attack on Israel on 7 October 2023.
  - Israeli troops and tanks re-enter Khan Yunis in the Gaza Strip after abruptly withdrawing from the city earlier in the monthmonth.
- 23 April – An Israeli airstrike kills two people and injures six others in Hanine.
- 24 April – U.S. President Joe Biden signs a 1$ billion military aid package supporting Israel and Ukraine.
- 26 April –
  - An 18-year-old Israeli woman is injured after being stabbed by Palestinian of Lod in Ramla near Tel Aviv who was then fatally shot by a passerby.
  - Thirty U.S. and Israeli rabbis and peace activists were arrested near the Gaza border protesting to bring awareness to starvation in Gaza.
- 30 April – An Israeli police officer is injured in a stabbing by a Turkish national in the Old City of Jerusalem. The assailant is fatally shot by other responding officers at the scene.

=== May ===
- 1 May – Following American pressure, Israel reopens the Erez Crossing and allows aid trucks into the northern part of the Gaza Strip.
- 2 May –
  - Turkey suspends all trade with Israel in response to their conduct in the war in Gaza, after previously suspending exports in a limited category of goods in April.
  - Several people are injured in alleged Israeli airstrikes on Damascus, the first since the attack on the Iranian consulate in April.
- 5 May –
  - Ten Israeli civilians are injured after Hamas launches a rocket barrage at the Kerem Shalom border crossing.
  - Al Jazeera goes off the air in Israel after the government announces a decision to shut the broadcaster’s operations following a long-running feud with the network.
  - Israeli air raids in Meiss Ej Jabal, Lebanon, cause "massive destruction" according to a Lebanese state-run agency, killing four civilians and injuring three others. In response, Hezbollah fires dozens of Katyusha and Falaq rockets towards Kiryat Shmona.
  - Hamas announces the end of ceasefire talks in Cairo, Egypt, while Israel vows to continue its military operations.
- 6 May –
  - Israel tells Gazans to evacuate part of Rafah ahead of a planned ground offensive.
  - Hamas states that it has accepted the ceasefire proposal from Qatar and Egypt; Israel, however, rejects the proposal, saying it is "unacceptable".
- 7 May –
  - Israeli forces enter Rafah in a "limited" operation, taking control of the Rafah Border Crossing on the Egypt–Gaza border.
  - At least 27 people are killed by Israeli airstrikes in Rafah.
- 8 May –
  - Israeli troops reach the outskirts of Rafah with Hamas saying that heavy fighting is underway. The Israeli military says it has "uncovered terrorist infrastructure", and killed a number of Hamas militants as it advances.
  - Israel reopens the Kerem Shalom border crossing, allowing humanitarian aid into Gaza. However, no aid has entered according to the UN.
- 9 May –
  - US President Joe Biden vows to withhold weapons from Israel if they launch a major invasion of Rafah.
  - Israeli tanks and warplanes strike eastern Rafah, killing more than 65 civilians and causing 80,000 people to flee.
- 12 May – US Secretary of State Antony Blinken warns Israel lacks a credible plan to protect Rafah civilians.
- 13 May –
  - The IDF advances into northern and southern Gaza.
  - A staff member of the United Nations Department of Safety and Security is killed and another is injured in Rafah.
  - Hamas says it has "lost contact" with the militants holding four Israeli hostages in the Gaza Strip, including Israeli-American Hersh Goldberg-Polin.
- 14 May – Israeli tanks enter residential areas of Rafah as they attempt to capture the city. Hamas' armed wing, the al-Qassam Brigades says that it destroyed an Israeli troop carrier with a Al-Yassin 105 anti-tank missile, killing several troops and injuring several others, while the IDF claims to have "eliminated" several terrorists in the city.
- 15 May – Five Israeli soldiers are killed in a friendly fire incident in Jabalia after IDF tanks open fire on their position.
- 16 May – Palestinian fighters, including Hamas and Palestinian Islamic Jihad, claim dozens of attacks on Israeli troops in and around the Jabalia refugee camp.
- 17 May –
  - Humanitarian aid deliveries begin arriving at the U.S.-built Gaza floating pier.
  - The IDF recovers from Rafah the bodies of three people killed in the Re'im music festival massacre last October, including Shani Louk.
  - Hamas announces that an Israeli strike killed Sharhabil Sayed, a Hamas commander in Lebanon.
  - Israel announces that an airstrike kills Islaam Hamaisa, a commander of the Palestinian Islamic Jihad's Jenin Brigades.
- 18 May –
  - The Israeli army recovers the body of Ron Binyamin, who was killed and brought to Gaza by Palestinian militants in October.
  - Benny Gantz threatens to withdraw his party from the unity coalition if Prime Minister Benjamin Netanyahu doesn't submit a post-war plan for Gaza by 8 June.
- 20 May – The Prosecutor of the International Criminal Court Karim Khan requests a warrant for Prime Minister Netanyahu, Israeli Defence Minister Yoav Gallant, Hamas chief Yahya Sinwar, Mohammed Deif, and Ismail Haniyeh for alleged war crimes and crimes against humanity.
- 21 May –
  - The IDF launches a raid on Jenin, with sources claiming seven Palestinians were killed.
  - The Israeli Ministry of Communications seizes broadcasting equipment from the Associated Press and halt their live feed of Gaza, accusing them of breaking the new media law by supplying images to Al Jazeera.
- 23 May – At least 60 Palestinians are killed in Israeli attacks in Rafah, Deir al-Balah, and Gaza City.
- 24 May –
  - The IDF recovers the bodies of three captives who were killed and taken to Gaza by Palestinian militants in the 7 October attacks.
  - The International Court of Justice orders Israel to halt the military offensive in Rafah.
- 26 May –
  - The Al-Qassam Brigades of Hamas fire rockets towards Tel Aviv area in central Israel for the first time in four months.
  - Four U.S. Army vessels wash up on Israeli beaches, two of them in the Gaza Strip.
- 27 May – One Egyptian guard is killed in a shootout at the Rafah Border Crossing.
- 28 May –
  - Israeli tanks reach central Rafah for the first time with heavy clashes being reported.
  - At least 21 people are killed and 64 others are injured in an Israeli attack on a tent camp in al-Mawasi, Rafah Governorate.
  - The U.S. removes the Gaza floating pier from the Gaza Strip for repair after its flotilla was damaged in bad weather.
  - South Africa's genocide case against Israel: Mexico announces it will intervene in the genocide case on the side of South Africa.
- 30 May – The IDF lifts a ban on the sale of food to the Gaza Strip from Israel and the occupied West Bank.
- 31 May –
  - A medic is killed and another injured during an Israeli airstrike against an ambulance in Naqoura, Lebanon.
  - France bans Israeli defense firms from exhibiting at Eurosatory.

=== June ===
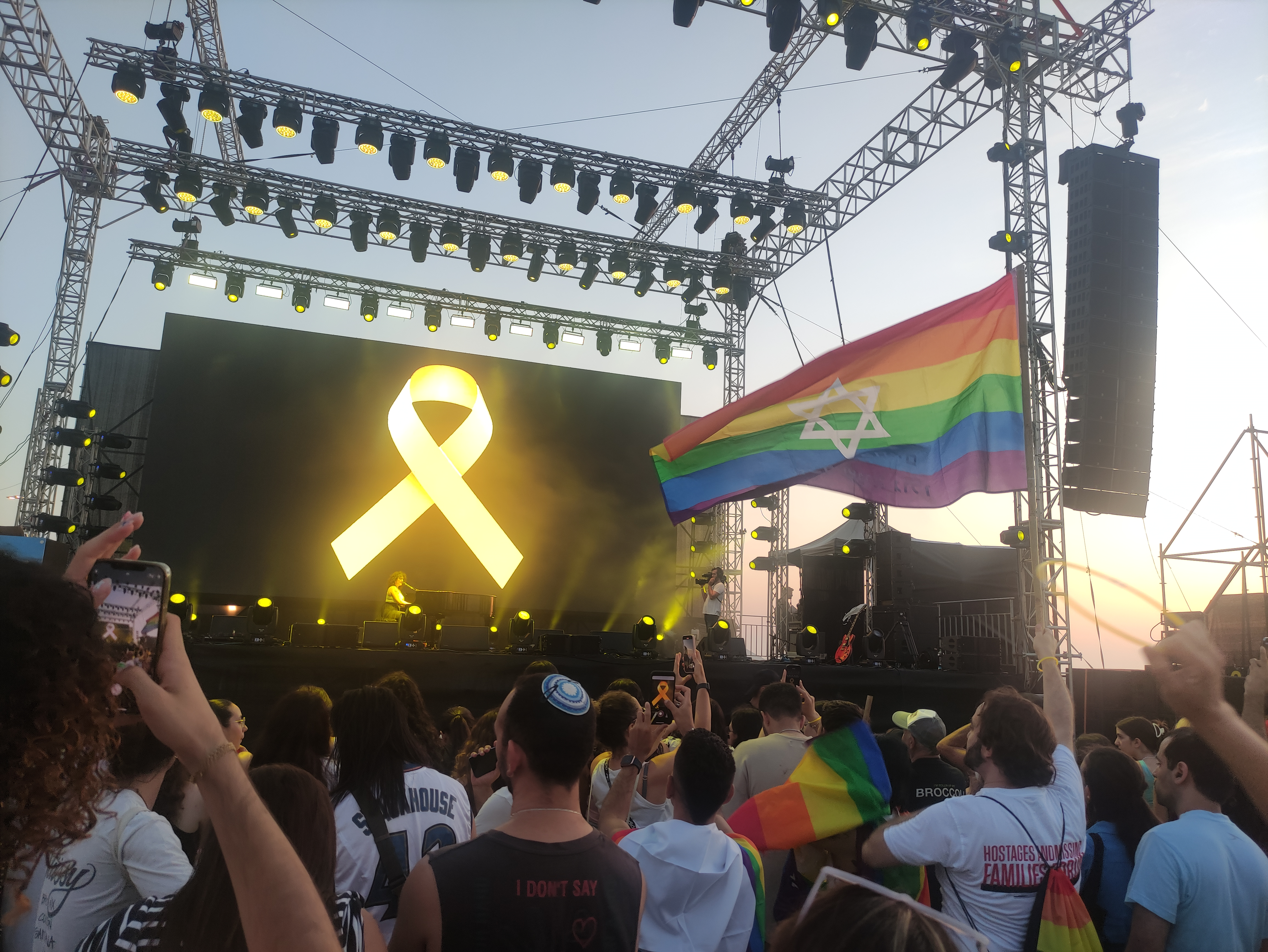
Gay Pride and Hope rally in Charles Clore Park, Tel Aviv-Yaffo, 6 June 2024

- 5 June – Hezbollah strikes an Iron Dome battery in Ramot Naftali.
- 6 June –
  - South Africa's genocide case against Israel: Spain applies to join South Africa's case at the International Court of Justice accusing Israel of genocide.
  - Three Palestinians are killed and several others are injured during an IDF raid on Jenin.
- 7 June –
  - UN advisors announce the intention of the organization to add Israel, Hamas and Palestinian Islamic Jihad to their list of countries and armed groups that harm children in their upcoming "Children and Armed Conflict" report.
  - USAID reinstalls a temporary aid pier while the Gaza floating pier is being fixed due to weather damage.
  - Benny Gantz schedules an 8 June announcement for his National Unity Party to leave the current coalition government run by Benjamin Netanyahu due to the latter failing to draw a post-war plan with the war cabinet.
- 8 June – 2024 Nuseirat rescue operation: Four hostages kidnapped by Hamas and held in the Nuseirat refugee camp, including Noa Argamani, are rescued in an Israeli special operation.
- 9 June –
  - Benny Gantz resigns from the war cabinet, citing Benjamin Netanyahu's failure to achieve a "true victory" in Gaza.
  - Two people are killed in IDF airstrikes near Aitaroun, Lebanon according to the National News Agency.
- 12 June – Israel kills three Hezbollah fighters and Taleb Abdullah, a senior commander, in southern Lebanon. Hezbollah retaliates by launching over 250 rockets towards northern Israel, the most it had deployed in the war.
- 14 June –
  - The U.N. pauses humanitarian aid deliveries at the U.S.-constructed Gaza floating pier pending investigations on if it was involved in the Israeli raid on the Nuseirat refugee camp and on its security for humanitarian workers.
  - The U.S. military announces plans to temporarily dismantle the Gaza floating pier and move it to Israel following predictions of rough seas, halting its humanitarian aid shipments for the 3rd time in one month.
  - The U.S. State Department officially adds the Israeli group Tsav 9 to its list of sanctioned entities for impeding the delivery of humanitarian aid to the Gaza Strip.
- 15 June – Eight Israeli soldiers are killed in an ambush in Tal al-Sultan, Rafah.
- 17 June –
  - Prime minister Netanyahu announces the dissolution of the war cabinet following the earlier resignation of Benny Gantz.
  - Eight Palestinians are killed by Israeli fire while waiting for commercial trucks in Gaza.
  - Hezbollah commander Muhammad Ahmed Ayoub is allegedly killed in an Israeli airstrike in Selaa, Lebanon, with further strikes occurring against Hezbollah targets across southern Lebanon.
- 19 June –
  - Three Hezbollah militants are killed in an Israeli strike in Tyre, Lebanon.
  - Two Hezbollah rockets damages several Israeli military vehicles in northern Israel.
  - Hezbollah secretary general Hassan Nasrallah threatens Cyprus if it allows Israel to use its airports and bases for military exercises.
- 20 June – The Israel Antiquities Authority announces the discovery of a 3,300-year-old ship and its cargo, one of the oldest known examples of a ship sailing far from land. The ship was discovered last year by a company drilling for natural gas off the coast of Northern Israel.
- 21 June – Israel and Ukraine mutually impose travel restrictions to each others' citizens, preventing reciprocal visa-free travel without an authorization permit.
- 23 June –
  - The Houthis claim to have carried out a joint military operation with the Islamic Resistance in Iraq to target four vessels in the Port of Haifa.
  - More than 150,000 Israelis rally and march in Tel Aviv to protest against Prime Minister Netanyahu and his government, calling for new elections, the return of hostages, and a ceasefire.
- 24 June –
  - Eleven Palestinians, including the director of Gaza's Ambulance and Emergency Department, are killed in Israeli airstrikes on the al-Shati refugee camp, Bani Suhaila, and Gaza City.
  - Prime Minister Netanyahu rejects the U.S.-backed ceasefire proposal for the war in Gaza, instead committing to continuing the war and "the goal of eliminating Hamas."
- 25 June –
  - Israeli forces bomb Gaza, with one strike killing 10 relatives of Hamas political chief Ismail Haniyeh.
  - The Supreme Court of Israel rules that the IDF and the government of Israel are legally bound to enforce Haredi conscription on yeshiva students.
- 26 June – An Israeli airstrike on a home in Beit Lahia in North Gaza allegedly kills at least 15 Palestinians.
- 30 June –
  - At least six Palestinians are killed in Rafah, as Israeli tanks re-enter Shuja'iyya and parts of northern Gaza, displacing more than 60,000 people.
  - Thousands of Haredi Jewish men clash with Israel Police during protests in Jerusalem against the 25 June Supreme Court ruling ordering the Haredi conscription of yeshiva students.

=== July ===
- 1 July – The IDF orders a mass evacuation of Palestinians from the entire eastern half of Khan Yunis and surrounding areas in anticipation of a new ground assault on the city.
- 2 July –
  - An IDF airstrike kills at least nine people in Khan Yunis, hours after Israel ordered a mass evacuation.
  - A dozen resigned U.S. federal government officials release a joint statement denouncing the Biden administration for its "undeniable complicity" in war crimes against Palestinian civilians by violating U.S. laws to continue sending Israel weapons.
- 3 July –
  - Two people are injured in a stabbing at a shopping centre in Karmiel. An Arab-Israeli is shot dead by security forces after being identified as the assailant.
  - The Israeli government approves the seizure of 12.7 square kilometers (4.9 square miles) of Palestinian land in the Jordan Valley, representing the largest land grab in the West Bank in more than three decades.
  - An Israeli strike kills Mohammed Nasser, a top commander in Hezbollah. He is considered to be one of the highest-ranking figures from the group to die during the conflict. In retaliation, Hezbollah launches a barrage of at least 100 Katyusha rockets towards northern Israel, targeting IDF positions.
- 4 July –
  - Israel approves the construction of 5,295 Israeli settler homes in dozens of settlements in the West Bank.
  - Hezbollah launches at least 200 rockets and several drones at ten IDF sites and threatens to expand its targeting range, in retaliation for the killing of Mohammed Nasser, a top Hezbollah commander.
- 5 July – At least seven Palestinians are killed during an IDF raid in Jenin that targeted a building that several militants had barricaded themselves in.
- 6 July – At least 16 Palestinians are killed by an Israeli strike on a school housing Palestinians displaced from ongoing military operations in the Nuseirat refugee camp.
- 7 July –
  - Israeli strikes across Gaza kill at least 27 Palestinians. In Gaza City, four are killed in a strike on a UNRWA school sheltering displaced people and six others are killed in a strike on a house. Two people are killed in the Sabra neighbourhood, with six others in a strike on a residential building in Az-Zawayda.
  - Protesters march in Tel Aviv to call for a ceasefire, the return of all hostages, and for Netanyahu to step down.
- 9 July –
  - July 9, 2024 Gaza attacks: At least 50 Palestinians are killed and dozens more are injured in Israeli attacks on Tel al-Hawa, Sabra, and Shuja'iyya, Gaza City.
  - Al-Awda school attack: At least 29 Palestinians are killed in an Israeli attack targeting the entrance of a UNRWA-ran school sheltering displaced Palestinians, becoming Israel's fourth attack on Gaza schools in the past four days.
  - United Nations human rights experts accuse Israel of carrying out a "targeted starvation campaign" that resulted in child malnutrition and death in Gaza.
  - Hezbollah launches dozens of rockets at the Israeli-occupied Golan Heights, killing two Israelis.
- 11 July – The Biden administration resumes shipments of 500-pound bombs to Israel following a suspension in May 2024.
- 13 July – The IDF targets Hamas' Al-Qassam Brigades leader Mohammed Deif and another Hamas militant leader, Rafa’a Salameh, in a strike on a building between al-Mawasi and Khan Yunis in southern Gaza; Deif's death is unconfirmed while Hamas claims that over 90 people are killed in the strike.
- 15 July – An Israeli airstrike on Bint Jbeil, Lebanon kills three civilians and injures three others. The IDF says that its fighter jets struck a Hezbollah weapons storage facility in the area.
- 17 July – At least 42 Palestinians are killed and more than 70 others are injured in Israeli strikes on a United Nations-run school in the Nuseirat refugee camp and on a designated "safe zone" in al-Mawasi, Rafah.
- 16 July –
  - At least 57 Palestinians are killed by Israeli bombardments in Rafah, Khan Yunis, and parts of Gaza City.
  - An investigation by the Associated Press and Israeli investigative organization Shomrim finds that the United States and Israel allowed tax-deductible donations totaling over US$200,000 to multiple Israeli far-right extremist groups involved in blocking and disrupting humanitarian aid delivery to the Gaza Strip.
- 18 July –
  - The Knesset votes 68-9 in favor of a resolution describing a Palestinian state as "an existential danger to the State of Israel".
  - Both the Gaza Health Ministry and the Israeli Health Ministry report traces of type 2 polio in Gaza's sewage system, caused by "severe overcrowding" and Israel's blockade of hygiene products from entering the enclave.
- 19 July –
  - At least one person is killed and ten others are wounded when a kamikaze drone strikes central Tel Aviv, near the United States embassy. The Houthis claim responsibility.
  - The International Court of Justice rules that Israel's land annexation and settlement construction in East Jerusalem and the West Bank is unlawful, and demands an end to these practices "as soon as possible". The Court also rules that Israel's occupation in the West Bank amounts to apartheid.
- 20 July –
  - At least 37 Palestinians are killed and 54 are injured in Israeli airstrikes across the Gaza Strip, with the confirmed death toll surpassing 38,900 people.
  - Israeli airstrikes hit oil refineries and power stations in the Yemeni port of Hodeidah, killing and wounding several people.
- 21 July –
  - The Houthis target Eilat with multiple ballistic missiles, in response to the previous day's airstrikes.
  - Israel begins issuing call-up notices for Haredi conscription amid mass protests in Jerusalem.
- 22 July –
  - Israel orders mandatory evacuations across the Gaza Strip, including sections of the heavily populated Al-Mawasi humanitarian zone.
  - At least 70 Palestinians are killed and more than 200 others are injured by Israeli tank shelling and airstrikes in Khan Younis Governorate in the Gaza Strip.
  - The Knesset votes in favor of classifying UNRWA as a terrorist organization, allowing the motion to undergo supplementary deliberation regarding Israel severing relations with the agency.
- 24 July – Prime Minister Benjamin Netanyahu addresses a joint session of the United States Congress amid protests over Israel's conduct of the war in Gaza.
- 25 July – United States President Joe Biden and Vice President Kamala Harris hold separate meetings with Prime Minister Benjamin Netanyahu in the White House regarding the Israel–Hamas war and plans following its conclusion.
- 26 July –
  - A Palestinian governmental body announces that senior Hamas leader Mustafa Muhammad Abu Ara has died in Israeli prison after being arrested in October 2023.
  - The United Kingdom drops its challenge to the International Criminal Court's issuance of arrest warrants against Prime Minister Benjamin Netanyahu and Defense Minister Yoav Gallant.
- 27 July –
  - Majdal Shams attack:
    - Twelve people, including several children, are killed in rocket strikes on the Druze village of Majdal Shams in the Israeli-occupied Golan Heights. Israel claims that Hezbollah is responsible for the attack, but Hezbollah denies any involvement.
    - Prime Minister Benjamin Netanyahu vows that Hezbollah will "pay a heavy price" which "it has not paid so far" in response to the attack.
  - More than fifty people, including fifteen children, are killed in Israeli attacks on a school sheltering displaced people in Deir al-Balah in the Gaza Strip.
- 29 July – Far-right Israeli protestors, including several members of the Knesset, storm the Sde Teiman detention camp after the IDF detained nine reservists on suspicion of abusing a Palestinian detainee.
- 30 July –
  - An Israeli civilian is killed in the HaGoshrim kibbutz by a rocket fired from Lebanon.
  - 2024 Haret Hreik airstrike: Israel launches a missile attack on southern Beirut, Lebanon, killing the Senior Hezbollah commander Fuad Shukr, an Iranian advisor and five civilians and injuring 80 others.
- 31 July – Assassination of Ismail Haniyeh: Hamas political leader Ismail Haniyeh is assassinated in a missile strike in Tehran, Iran, after attending the inauguration ceremony of the Iranian president Masoud Pezeshkian. Israel admits responsibility for the killing on 23 December.

=== August ===
- 1 August –
  - Israel claims to have verified that it assassinated Hamas military commander Mohammed Deif in the 13 July 2024 al-Mawasi attack.
  - At least fifteen Palestinians are killed and 29 others are injured in an Israeli strike on a school in the Shuja'iyya neighborhood of Gaza City.
- 2 August – US President Joe Biden deploys multiple U.S. military warships, troops, and other military assets to the Middle East to support Israel against potential attacks from Iran and its proxies.
- 3 August – At least 15 people are killed in an Israeli attack on a school sheltering displaced people in the Sheikh Radwan neighbourhood of Gaza City.
- 4 August – Two people are killed and two others are injured in a knife attack in an Egged parking lot and a grove park at Dan Shomron Street of the Holon suburb of Tel Aviv, by illegal migrant Palestinian Ammar Razek Kamel Odeh, 35, of Salfit, West Bank who is then killed by a police officer at a gas station on Moshe Dayan Street.
- 5 August –
  - Israel returns 89 decomposed, unidentifiable Palestinian bodies to the Gaza Ministry of Health.
  - Ahead of expected retaliation against Israel for the assassination of Ismail Haniyeh, Iran issues a NOTAM, advising aircraft to change their routes over the country due to potential dangers en route.
- 6 August – Haredi Israelis storm the IDF base in Tel HaShomer in protest of Haredi conscription.
- 7 August –
  - The IDF confirms the death of Bilha Yinon, the last person missing in Israel following the 7 October attack by Hamas.
  - Six Palestinians are killed in an Israeli raid on the Maghazi refugee camp and in Khan Yunis in the Gaza Strip.
- 8 August –
  - One Lebanese civilian and a Hezbollah militant are killed and three Lebanese civilians are injured in Israeli strikes in southern Lebanon.
  - Hezbollah fires 25 rockets at the Israeli-occupied Golan Heights and fifteen rockets at Shlomi and Kabri in Upper Galilee. All rockets are intercepted by the Iron Dome.
- 9 August –
  - Israeli troops launch a new assault on Khan Yunis, with airstrikes killing at least 21 Palestinians and Israeli troops initiating ground operations in the city for the third time since the war's beginning.
  - The United States finances Israel with $3.5 billion to spend on U.S. weapons and military equipment.
  - Samer al-Hajj, a Hamas security official for the Ain al-Hilweh Palestinian refugee camp, is assassinated by an Israeli drone strike in Sidon, Lebanon.
- 10 August – Israeli rockets strike a school in Gaza City, killing over 100 Palestinians and injuring dozens.
- 12 August –
  - US Secretary of Defense Lloyd Austin orders the USS Abraham Lincoln aircraft carrier strike group and the USS Georgia, a nuclear cruise-missile submarine, to the Middle East to defend Israel from possible retaliation from Iran and to strengthen U.S. military posture in the region.
  - Hezbollah fires 30 Katyusha rockets targeting the IDF 146th Division headquarters in Ga'aton and an IDF surveillance station in Metula. An Iron Dome interceptor missile destroys an Avdon residence.
- 13 August –
  - The IAF launches airstrikes on Hezbollah targets in Kfar Kila, Marwahin, Meiss Ej Jabal and Aita al-Shaab in southern Lebanon.
  - The US government approves $20 billion in weapon sales to Israel, including fifty F-15 fighter jets and advanced upgrade kits for Israel's existing F-15 jets.
  - Crowds led by far-right Israeli security minister Itamar Ben-Gvir storm the Al-Aqsa Mosque and several villages in the West Bank on Tisha B'av. Israel Police officers reportedly offer protection to Israeli settlers, while the United States and the United Nations denounce the raids.
- 15 August – Hezbollah launches four rockets at IDF targets in Shamir and Malkia in Upper Galilee which are intercepted by the Iron Dome, causing a fire in Shamir and Ruwaysat al-Alam of Kfarchouba in southern Lebanon.
- 17 August –
  - Israeli officials state that they are attempting to "lower expectations" of a ceasefire deal due to significant gaps between Israel and Hamas demands, after United States president Joe Biden stated that he was "optimistic" about US-mediated negotiation progress in Qatar.
  - Ten Syrian workers are killed during an airstrike by Israel against a factory in Nabatieh, Lebanon.
  - Hezbollah reportedly strikes the Ayelet HaShahar kibbutz in Upper Galilee, wounding two Israeli soldiers in retaliation.
  - Two senior Hamas militants are killed in an Israeli airstrike in Jenin.
- 18 August – An attacker is killed while one person is injured in a suicide bombing in Tel Aviv claimed by Hamas.
- 19 August –
  - Several Israeli civilians are injured in Ya'ara in Hezbollah rocket launches and drone strikes in Western Galilee that were intercepted by Israeli Iron Dome. Hezbollah claims that it attacked and repelled Israeli soldiers attempting to infiltrate southern Lebanon through the Hadab Aita forest and had inflicted casualties.
  - Israeli airstrikes strike Hezbollah infrastructure in Aita al-Shaab, Beit Lif and Hula.
- 20 August –
  - The IDF recovers the bodies of six hostages held in the Gaza Strip by Hamas.
  - The Israeli Air Force launches airstrikes on the Hezbollah stronghold of Baalbek in the Beqaa Valley.
  - Four people are killed and two others are injured by Israeli strikes in Daraya, Mount Lebanon Governorate, according to the Lebanese Health Ministry. In response, Hezbollah launches drone strikes on IDF positions in the Israeli-occupied Golan Heights.
- 22 August –
  - Eleven Palestinians are killed and six others are injured in an Israeli strike on a residential building in Beit Lahia.
  - An Israeli drone strike kills three Palestinians in Tulkarm in the West Bank, during a raid where IDF soldiers set fire to civilian homes and used bulldozers to destroy residential areas.
  - The IDF launches airstrikes on Hezbollah targets in Chihine and related infrastructure in southern Lebanon.
  - Hezbollah shells and launches Katyusha rockets on IDF outposts in Ramot Naftali, Biranit, Zaura, Kiryat Shmona, Jal al-Allam, Malikiya, al-Marj, Matla and Ghajar in the Golan Heights.
- 23 August –
  - Hezbollah launches rocket strikes on IDF targets in Mount Meron and al-Malikiyah that were intercepted by the Iron Dome and caused wildfires.
- 24 August – Hamas refuses any ceasefire conditions that allow Israel to hold onto the Rafah Crossing and the Philadelphi Corridor, and accuses the United States of spreading false optimism to support Democratic nominee Kamala Harris's presidential campaign instead of implementing constructive diplomatic measures.
- 25 August –
  - The IDF says that it has launched preemptive strikes on Hezbollah in Lebanon ahead of an expected major missile and drone attack on Israel.
  - Defence Minister Yoav Gallant declares an "emergency situation" in Israel for the next 48 hours due to the "special situation in the home front.
  - At least 71 people are killed and 112 others are injured in Israeli attacks in the Gaza Strip.
- 27 August –
  - The IDF says commandos have rescued from an underground tunnel in Gaza Qaid Farhan Al-Qadi, a Negev Bedouin hostage who was kidnapped by Hamas during the 7 October attack on Israel.
  - Five Palestinians are killed in an Israeli airstrike on the Nur Shams refugee camp in the West Bank. Separately, a Palestinian man is killed and six other people are injured in an attack by Israeli settlers in Wadi Rahal village.
  - Four civilians are injured in IDF airstrikes on Hezbollah targets in Bint Cabal, Chihine, Hair, Khiam, Meiss el-Jabal, Majadel and Odaisseh.
- 28 August –
  - The IDF launches a major military operation in the West Bank, mainly in Jenin and Tulkarm, with at least nine Palestinians killed and several others injured. The Al-Israa Specialised Hospital and the Thabet Thabet Governmental Hospital are surrounded, and ambulances are blocked from entering.
  - The United States Department of State imposes sanctions on Israeli settler group Hashomer Yosh and a civilian security coordinator for the Yitzhar settlement for settler violence against Palestinians in the West Bank.
- 29 August –
  - Mohammed "Abu Shujaa" Jaber, the leader of the Tulkarm Brigade, is killed during an Israeli attack against the Nur Shams refugee camp in Tulkarm. Four other militants are also killed.
  - The number of Palestinians killed since the beginning of the operation on 28 August increases to 18, while dozens are wounded and at least 20 more arrested.
  - Israeli airstrikes hit Hezbollah targets in Kafr Kila and Yarine in southern Lebanon.
  - The IDF carries out an airstrike on a humanitarian aid convoy in Gaza that kills five workers.
  - Israel and Hamas agree to three separate three-day humanitarian pauses to allow the World Health Organization to vaccinate more than 600,000 children against polio in the Gaza Strip.
- 30 August – Three Palestinian fighters, including Jenin Brigades leader Wissam Hazem, are killed in a drone strike inside the Jenin refugee camp. Separately, an Israeli soldier is killed and others injured in an IED attack in the camp.
- 31 August –
  - Israeli strikes kill at least 48 people in the Gaza Strip.
  - The IDF recovers the bodies of six hostages kidnapped by Hamas during the 7 October attack on Israel, including Israeli-American citizen Hersh Goldberg-Polin, from an underground tunnel near Rafah.

=== September ===
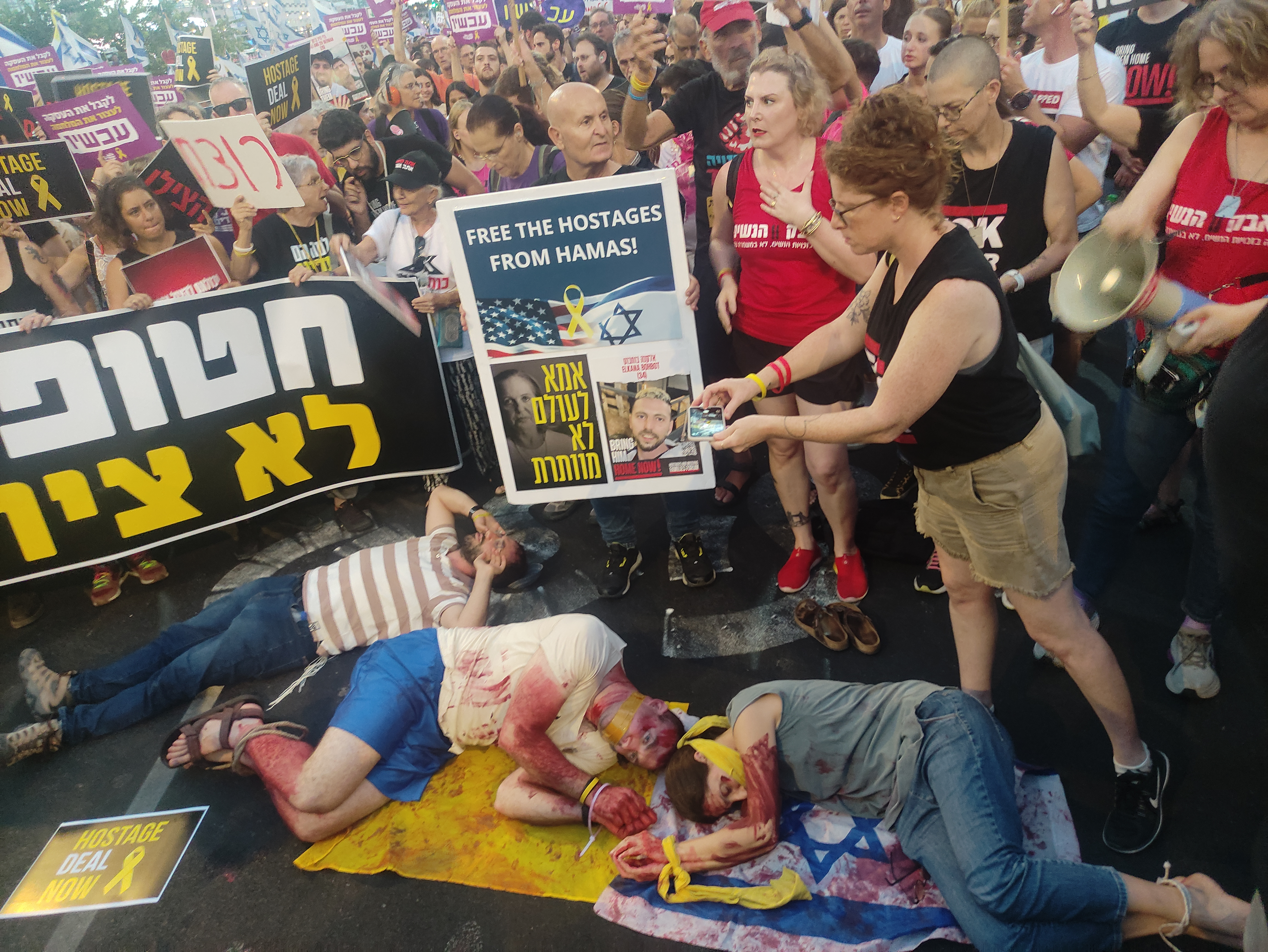
Rally supporting hostage deal, Tel Aviv, 2 September 2024

- 1 September –
  - 2024 Tarqumiyah shooting: Three Israeli police officers are killed during a shooting on a road in Tarqumiyah in the West Bank.
  - September 2024 Israel hostage deal protests: Hundreds of thousands of Israelis, including approximately 300,000 in Tel Aviv, protest in cities across the country following the recovery of the bodies of six hostages from Gaza, with the Histadrut calling for a general strike on 2 September and for Prime Minister Netanyahu to resign after failing to negotiate a ceasefire. At least 29 people are arrested on accusations of vandalism, disorderly conduct, and attacking police officers.
- 2 September – The general strike called by the Histadrut commences, but is ordered stopped by the Labor Courts of Israel following an intervention from finance minister Bezalel Smotrich.
- 4 September – A civilian is killed and seven others are injured in Israeli airstrikes and shelling in southern Lebanon.
- 5 September – Six people are killed and another is wounded during an Israeli airstrike on a vehicle in Tubas. Separately, a teenager is shot dead in the city by Israeli soldiers.
- 6 September –
  - Turkish-American activist Ayşenur Ezgi Eygi is shot dead by Israeli soldiers during an anti-Israeli settlement protest in the West Bank.
  - The IAF launches airstrikes on Hezbollah targets in Blida, Aita al-Shaab, al-Matmura and Yarin and uses white phosphorus artillery rounds on Tell en-Nhas and al-Hamams that causes wildfires in southern Lebanon. In response, Hezbollah launches missiles on Metula, Manara and IDF Zabadin barracks in Ruwaysat al-Qarn of the Shebaa Farms in northern Israel.
  - At least 27 Palestinians are killed by Israeli airstrikes in cities across the Gaza Strip, including in the Nuseirat refugee camp.
- 8 September –
  - IDF claims Hezbollah militants are killed in airstrikes on Hezbollah targets in Aitaroun, Maroun al-Ras and Yaroun in southern Lebanon.
  - Hezbollah launches Katyusha rockets on Kiryat Shmona and Shamir in northern Israel.
  - Three Israelis are killed by Jordanian gunmen in an attack at the Allenby Bridge of the Jordanian border.
  - Israel launches several airstrikes in central Syria, including the Tartus and Hama governorates.
- 9 September – At least eight people are killed and dozens are wounded in Israeli strikes across the Gaza Strip, bringing the confirmed Palestinian death toll to over 41,000.
- 10 September – At least 40 people are killed and over 60 are injured during an Israeli airstrike in Al-Mawasi, according to Hamas. Twenty tents for displaced people are hit during the attack. The IDF claims that it struck senior Hamas commanders who were operating in a command center embedded inside a designated humanitarian area. They are later named as Samer Abu Daqqa, the head of Hamas’s aerial forces; Osama Tabash, the head of surveillance and targets in Hamas’s intelligence division; and Ayman Mabhouh, another senior Hamas officer. All three were directly involved in the 7 October attack, according to the IDF.
- 11 September –
  - Five Palestinians are killed by an Israeli drone strike in Tubas, West Bank.
  - Six UNRWA staffers are killed in Israeli airstrikes on a school in central Gaza.
  - An IAF UH-60 Black Hawk helicopter crashes in Rafah during a mission to evacuate an injured combat engineer, killing two personnel on board.
- 12 September –
  - The death toll from Israel's military operation in the West Bank increases to 50, with three people killed after a drone strike in Tulkarm.
  - The U.S. State Department approves $165 million in weapons sales to Israel to fund tank transporters along with spare parts, tool kits, and technical and logistics support. The parts are expected to be delivered in 2027.
- 15 September – The Houthis in Yemen fire a ballistic missile into an open area in central Israel.
- 17–18 September – At least 42 people are killed and more than 3,500 others are injured in explosions of pagers and walkie-talkies across Lebanon mostly targeting Hezbollah and affiliated individuals. Israel is accused of orchestrating the attacks. which is denied by Israeli officials.
- 19 September – Two Israeli soldiers are killed and eight others are injured in Hezbollah drone and anti-tank missile attacks on the Israel–Lebanon border.
- 20 September – Assassination of Ibrahim Aqil: The IAF launches airstrikes on Dahieh, Beirut targeting Hezbollah’s operations commanders Ibrahim Aqil and Ahmed Wehbe. At least 45 people are killed, while more than 68 others are injured.
- 21 September – At least 22 people are killed and 30 others are injured in an Israeli airstrike on a school in the Zeitoun area of Gaza City.
- 22 September –
  - Hezbollah launches a barrage of rockets at an IDF base in Haifa, in retaliation for the assassination of Ibrahim Aqil. An Israeli civilian is slightly injured by an Iron Dome interception.
  - At least seven people are killed in an Israeli airstrike on the Kafr Qasim school on the Al-Shati refugee camp in the Gaza Strip.
  - Israeli forces raid and order the closure of the offices of Al Jazeera Arabic in Ramallah in the West Bank.
- 23 September –
  - The IAF launches Operation Northern Arrows, conducting over 1,300 airstrikes against Hezbollah in southern Lebanon, killing at least 558 people, including 50 children, and wounding over 1,835 others.
  - The IDF advises Lebanese civilians in southern Lebanon to evacuate north.
- 24 September –
  - The Israeli government declares a nationwide state of emergency amid its conflict with Lebanon.
  - The IDF announces that they killed Ibrahim Qubaisi, Hezbollah's missile and rocket force commander, in an airstrike in Beirut.
- 25 September –
  - Hezbollah launches a ballistic missile targeting the Mossad headquarters in Tel Aviv, which is intercepted, while Israel conducts a further 260 airstrikes across Lebanon.
  - The United States, the European Union, and several other countries call for an immediate 21-day ceasefire along the Blue Line on the Israel–Lebanon border.
- 26 September –
  - Two people are killed and 15 injured during an airstrike in Beirut. 115 airstrikes across the rest of Lebanon kills at least 60, and injures 81.
  - Israel rejects proposals from the United States, Australia, and the European Union to initiate a temporary 21-day ceasefire with Hezbollah.
  - The United States grants Israel a US$8.7 billion military aid package. Secretary of Defense Lloyd Austin states that the US will not change its commitment to giving military aid to Israel regardless of a reporter's question regarding U.S. "red lines".
- 27 September –
  - At least fifteen airstrikes are carried out against Beirut, in what is described as the worst attack in the city so far. Israel claims they have targeted Hezbollah's central headquarters. Four buildings are destroyed. Hezbollah Secretary-General Hassan Nasrallah is also killed in the attacks, along with Abbas Nilforoushan, an Iranian Islamic Revolutionary Guard Corps deputy commander.
  - Israel launches an airstrike against a Syrian Army post near Kfeir Yabous, Syria, killing five soldiers and wounding one.
- 28 September –
  - The IDF begins a blockade of Beirut–Rafic Hariri International Airport in order to prevent the shipment of Iranian weapons to Lebanon. The blockade will not affect the operation of civilian flights at the airport.
  - The Houthis launch a ballistic missile from Yemen towards Ben Gurion Airport in Israel, prompting air raid sirens in Tel Aviv and most of Central Israel.
- 29 September –
  - Israel carries out airstrikes on Houthi targets in Ras Isa and Hodeidah in Yemen.
  - New Hope leader Gideon Sa'ar joins the Netanyahu cabinet as a minister without portfolio.
- 30 September –
  - Three militants of the Popular Front for the Liberation of Palestine are killed during an Israeli airstrike in Kola District, Beirut. Separately, Hamas's commander in Lebanon, Fatah Sharif, is killed alongside his family in Sidon.
  - Israel tells the United States it will launch an imminent ground invasion of Southern Lebanon. The military operation will focus on clearing out Hezbollah infrastructure near Israeli border communities, according to officials.
  - A Lebanese Army soldier is killed in an Israeli drone strike in Wazzani.

=== October ===
- 1 October –
  - Israeli forces launches full-scale ground operations in southern Lebanon against Hezbollah for the first time since the 2006 war.
  - Israel launches an airstrike in the Ain al-Hilweh refugee camp in Sidon targeting Munir al-Maqdah, an official with the Al-Aqsa Martyrs' Brigades in Lebanon.
  - An explosion is reported in Tel Aviv, while a drone is intercepted over the Mediterranean Sea.
  - Iran launches Operation True Promise 2, a series of missile attacks against Israel.
  - Palestinian gunmen open fire on a light rail train station in Jaffa, killing seven people. The two suspects are killed, while Hamas' military wing, the Al-Qassam Brigades claims responsibility.
- 2 October –
  - Foreign Minister Israel Katz declares United Nations Secretary-General Antonio Guterres persona non grata in Israel for not condemning the October 2024 Iranian strikes against Israel in a statement on the Middle East conflict.
  - Israeli strikes kill 51 people in southern Gaza,
  - Hezbollah kills two Israeli soldiers and wounds 18 others who conducted an incursion into Lebanon.
  - The US imposes sanctions against the Israeli settler group Hilltop Youth and two other Israelis for attacks on Palestinians in the West Bank.
  - Israel introduces new customs regulations and restrictions on humanitarian aid deliveries into the Gaza Strip, significantly impeding food and essential supply delivery via the Jordan route.
- 3 October –
  - An Israeli airstrike kills Abdul Aziz Saleha, known for his role in the 2000 Ramallah lynching, in central Gaza.
  - Israel launches an airstrike against an Islamic Health Authority's office in Beirut, Lebanon, killing nine medics.
  - Two Lebanese army soldiers are killed in separate Israeli strikes on south Lebanon.
  - The IDF announces that it killed Rawhi Mushtaha, the head of the Hamas government in Gaza, along with Sameh al-Siraj and Sami Oudeh, who were responsible for security in Hamas in an airstrike in July.
  - Hossein Ali Hazimeh, head of Hezbollah's intelligence headquarters, is killed in an Israeli airstrike in Beirut.
  - A Yazidi woman is freed from Gaza in an operation involving U.S. and Israeli forces, the woman was kidnapped from her home in Iraq aged 11 and sold and trafficked to Gaza. Her captor was recently killed presumably from an Israeli airstrike allowing her to escape and seek repatriation.
  - The Lebanese Armed Forces open fire on Israeli troops near Bint Jbeil for the first time since the invasion began.
  - The IAF launches an airstrike on Tulkarm in the West Bank, reportedly killing at least 16 people.
  - Senior Hezbollah official Hashem Safieddine, who is expected to succeed Hassan Nasrallah as the group's secretary-general following his assassination, is killed by an Israeli airstrike in Beirut, later confirmed by Hezbollah on 23 October.
- 4 October –
  - Hamas' armed wing, the Al-Qassam Brigades confirms the death of commander Zahi Yaser Oufi in an Israeli strike in Tulkarm in the West Bank.
  - Two rockets launched from Gaza at Israeli communities of Kissufim and Ein Hashlosha.
- 5 October – Hamas says that an Israeli strike killed Saeed Atallah, a leader in the Al-Qassam Brigades, along with three family members in a Palestinian refugee camp in Tripoli, Lebanon.
- 6 October – A knife-wielding gunman kills a border police officer and injures ten people at a McDonald's at the central bus station of Beersheba before being killed by a responding medic.
- 7 October
  - Hamas, Hezbollah and the Houthis fire rockets across Israel on the anniversary of the 7 October attacks.
  - The National Memorial Ceremony of October 7 Families
- 9 October –
  - Two civilians are killed in a Hezbollah rocket attack on Kiryat Shmona.
  - One person is killed and five others are injured in a mass stabbing in Hadera.
- 11 October – A building in Herzliya is hit by a drone attack from Lebanon, causing power outages in the area.
- 13 October – Four soldiers are killed and 61 others are injured in a Hezbollah drone strike on Binyamina.
- 17 October – Israeli forces kill Yahya Sinwar, chairman of the Hamas political bureau, during an encounter in Rafah.
- 18 October – The IDF kills two assailants south of the Dead Sea who entered the country from Jordan in an encounter that leaves two Israeli soldiers injured. The Muslim Brotherhood in Jordan claims responsibility for the incursion.
- 19 October –
  - A drone attack is made on the residence of Benjamin Netanyahu in Caesarea. No casualties are reported, while Hezbollah claims responsibility for the attack.
  - Israeli airstrikes kill at least 50 people in Beit Lahia in the northern Gaza Strip with at least 33 people, including 21 women, killed at the Jabalia refugee camp which the U.N. strongly condemns.
- 20 October –
  - Colonel Ehsan Daxa, the commander of the IDF's 401st Armored Brigade, is killed by an IED attack in Jabalia in northern Gaza, becoming the most senior officer to have been killed in the fighting in Gaza.
  - U.S. Defense Department officials announce an investigation into the leaking of two confidential U.S. intelligence documents to a pro-Iranian Telegram channel showing U.S. assessments of and intelligence given for Israel's detailed military preparations for retaliatory attacks against Iran.
  - Three Lebanese soldiers are killed in an Israeli strike on their truck after being mistakenly identified as Hezbollah militants, prompting an apology from the IDF.
- 21 October –
  - Israeli airstrikes kill thirteen people and injure 57 more near Rafik Hariri University Hospital in Beirut.
  - Israel launches airstrikes across Southern Lebanon, including in Beirut and the Beqaa Valley, targeting alleged Hezbollah financial institutions.
- 22 October –
  - At least fifteen people killed in an Israeli drone strike on Beit Lahia, Northern Gaza.
  - The FBI announces an investigation into the leaking of classified U.S. intelligence documents regarding military plans for Israeli retaliation against Iran.
- 23 October – Israeli airstrikes across Gaza kill 42 people.
- 24 October –
  - Five Israeli soldiers are killed and seven others are injured in clashes with Hezbollah militants in southern Lebanon.
  - An Israeli airstrike on a school kills at least 17 Palestinians, including children in Nuseirat refugee camp.
- 25 October –
  - Israeli forces storm Kamal Adwan Hospital in Jabalia, Gaza.
  - Israeli airstrikes across Gaza kill 72 people with at least 38 killed in Khan Younis.
  - Three soldiers from the IDF's Armored Corps are killed in an IED attack in Jabalia, Gaza.
  - Two Al Mayadeen and Al-Manar cameramen and a technician are killed in an Israeli airstrike at a guest house in Hasbaya, Lebanon with several more injured.
- 26 October – Israel launches Operation Days of Repentance (also known as "Days of Atonement" against Iran, with multiple airstrikes against Tehran, Karaj and Imam Khomeini International Airport in response to recent ballistic missile attacks launched by Iran. Four Iranian soldiers are killed.
- 27 October –
  - One person is killed and at least 40 others are injured, ten of the critically in a truck-ramming at a bus stop near Glilot military base and Mossad headquarters in the Tel Aviv neighbourhood of Ramat HaSharon, the suspect is shot dead.
  - Four IDF soldiers, including a military rabbi, are killed and five personnel are injured in fighting in southern Lebanon.
  - 22 people are killed in Israeli airstrikes in Beit Lahia.
  - Egyptian President Abdel Fattah el-Sisi proposes a temporary two-day ceasefire in Gaza to exchange four Israeli hostages for several Palestinian prisoners.
- 28 October –
  - The Knesset passes legislation designating the United Nations Relief and Works Agency for Palestine Refugees in the Near East (UNRWA) as a "terrorist organization", which will take effect "within 90 days".
  - Seven people are killed in IDF raids and airstrikes on Tyre, Lebanon.
  - Israeli airstrikes kill at least 60 people and injure 58 others in the Beqaa Valley, Lebanon.
- 29 October –
  - At least 93 people are killed and 40 others are reported missing in Israeli airstrikes on a residential building in Beit Lahia.
  - The World Food Programme warns of intensifying famine conditions in northern Gaza caused by ongoing Israeli aid blockades.
  - Sixteen people are killed in Israeli airstrikes in southern Lebanon, including ten in Sarafand.
  - Eight Austrian peacekeepers are injured when a rocket hits the UNIFIL headquarters in Naqoura, Lebanon.
- 30 October –
  - Nineteen people are killed in Israeli airstrikes on two villages in Baalbek, Lebanon.
  - Mustafa Ahmad Shahadi, deputy head of the Radwan Force, is killed in an Israeli airstrike in Nabatieh, Lebanon.
- 31 October –
  - A Hezbollah missile barrage kills at least seven people and critically wounds one other near Metula, Haifa and Kiryat Ata in northern Israel with the victims entailing four foreign agricultural workers and two Israeli Arabs.
  - At least six medics are killed and four others are wounded in Israeli attacks on areas in Duris and around Baalbek, Lebanon.

=== November ===
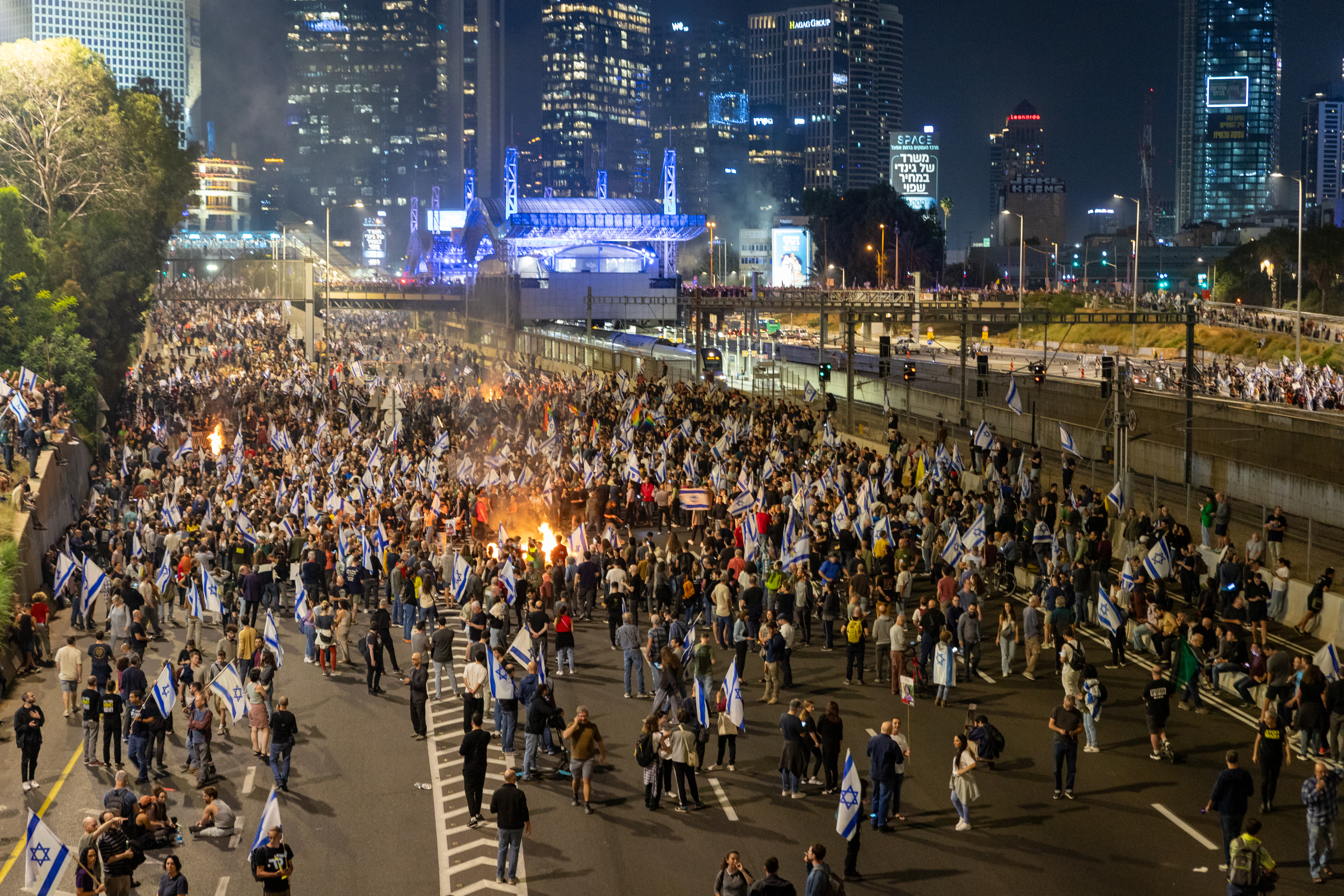
Demonstration against the dismissal of Defense Minister Yoav Gallant, 5 November 2025

- 1 November – The United Nations declares the situation in northern Gaza as "apocalyptic", with the entire Palestinian population at "imminent risk of dying from disease, famine and violence" due to Israeli bombardments and aid blockage.
- 2 November – Six people are injured, including two children, in an Israeli strike on a polio vaccination centre in northern Gaza as the World Health Organization vaccination campaign resumes with its second phase.
- 3 November –
  - More than 50 children are killed in Israeli airstrikes in Jabalia in northern Gaza in the past two days.
  - At least 31 people are killed in Israeli airstrikes across the Gaza Strip, primarily in northern Gaza, according to Palestinian medics.
  - 18 people are killed in a series of Israeli airstrikes on over two dozen settlements in the Beqaa Valley.
  - Three people are killed and nine others are injured in Israeli airstrikes in Sidon, Lebanon.
- 4 November –
  - At least twelve Palestinians are killed in Israeli attacks across the Gaza Strip, including seven at the Kamal Adwan Hospital in Beit Lahia.
  - Police arrest a top aide to Prime Minister Netanyahu after opponents accuse the aide of leaking allegedly false classified intelligence to prevent a potential Gaza ceasefire and hostage deal.
  - At least three people are killed in an Israeli attack on residential buildings in Ghazieh and Sidon.
- 5 November –
  - At least 29 Palestinians are killed in Israeli airstrikes on several refugee camps across the Gaza Strip.
  - Thirty people are killed after an Israeli airstrike against a residential building in Barja, Lebanon.
  - Yoav Gallant is dismissed as defense minister by Prime Minister Netanyahu and is replaced by foreign minister Israel Katz, who is in turn replaced by Gideon Saar. The decision leads to widespread protests.
- 6 November –
  - Israeli airstrikes in the Beqaa Valley kill 55 people and injure 59 others.
  - Hezbollah fires rockets at Tel Aviv, Israel, with a rocket striking Ben Gurion Airport.
- 7 November –
  - At least twelve Palestinians are killed and several others are injured in Israeli airstrikes on a school used to shelter displaced people in the Al-Shati refugee camp in the Gaza Strip.
  - The Israeli Ministry of Defence announces that it has signed an agreement to acquire 25 F-15EX fighter jets from Boeing as part of a $5.2 billion aid package from the U.S. government. At least four jets will be delivered annually beginning in 2031.
  - Hezbollah launches drones at the IDF base in Kfar Bilu and the Haifa naval base. No casualties are reported.
  - Israel Police forcibly enter the French-administered Church of the Pater Noster compound in Jerusalem and detain two French consulate employees. French foreign minister Jean-Noël Barrot cancels his visit to the site while the French government summons the Israeli ambassador Aliza Bin-Noun in response.
  - The Knesset passes a law allowing for the deportation of relatives of Palestinians and Arab-Israelis who engage in attacks deemed as terrorism.

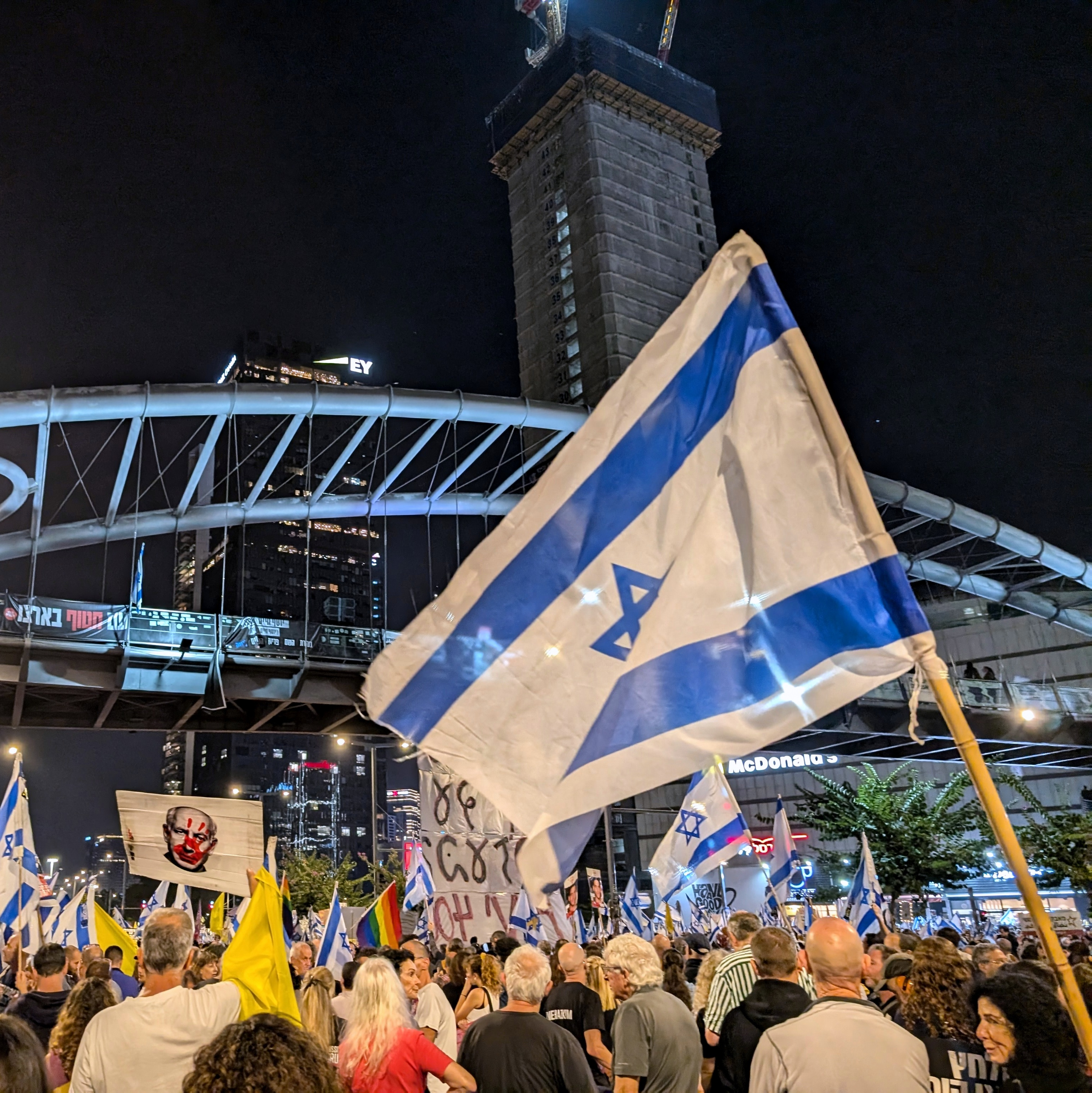
Rally for the return of the hostages, Tel Aviv, 9 November 2024

- 8 November – Pro-Palestinian locals attack supporters of Israeli football team Maccabi Tel Aviv F.C. after a match with AFC Ajax in Amsterdam, Netherlands, following instances of anti-Palestinian and anti-Arab chants and vandalism by Maccabi ultras. At least 30 people are injured, with five hospitalized, and 62 people are arrested. Dutch authorities condemn the attacks as antisemitic with the government of Amsterdam subsequently banning protests and demonstrations in the city for three days.
- 9 November –
  - At least one Palestinian man is killed and two others are injured in a raid by Israeli forces in Aqqaba in the West Bank.
  - At least 40 people, including several children, are killed in Israeli airstrikes on several cities in Lebanon.
- 10 November –
  - At least 40 people are killed in Israeli airstrikes across the Gaza Strip, including at least 24 in the Jabalia refugee camp. The IDF claims they killed a top Palestinian Islamic Jihad commander in the strikes.
  - An Israeli airstrike on a house in Gaza City kills Wael al-Khour, a minister in the Hamas-run government, along with his wife and their three children.
  - Qatar withdraws from ceasefire talks between Hamas and Israel as mediator due to "a refusal to negotiate a deal in good faith" from both sides.
  - An Israeli airstrike in the village of Aalmat, Lebanon, kills at least 23 people, including seven children, and injures six others.
- 11 November –
  - At least 30 people are killed in Israeli strikes across the Gaza Strip, including at least 20 in the Nuseirat refugee camp.
  - At least 44 people are killed and 88 more injured during Israeli airstrikes across Lebanon.
- 12 November –
  - At least 40 people are killed in Israeli airstrikes across the Gaza Strip, including ten in a double tap strike on a designated humanitarian zone in the Al-Mawasi refugee camp in Rafah Governorate.
  - At least 14 people are killed and at least 15 others are injured in an Israeli airstrike on a residential building in Ain Yaaqoub, northern Lebanon.
- 13 November –
  - Six Israeli soldiers from the Golani Brigade are killed in a three-hour gun battle with Hezbollah militants in southern Lebanon.
  - Turkish President Recep Tayyip Erdoğan announces that Turkey has suspended all diplomatic relations with and will not develop any further relations with Israel. However, the Turkish embassy in Tel Aviv will continue to operate. Israel's foreign ministry denies any change in its diplomatic relationship with Turkey.
- 14 November –
  - Fifteen rescue workers are killed during an Israeli airstrike on the Lebanese Civil Defense's headquarters in Baalbek.
  - Sixteen people are killed and 15 others are injured in Israeli airstrikes against residential buildings in Damascus, Syria. The Palestinian Islamic Jihad announces that a number of its militants are among the fatalities.
- 17 November –
  - Pope Francis calls for the global community to investigate whether Israel is committing genocide in Gaza.
  - At least 72 people are killed, a third of whom are children, in an Israeli strike against a residential building in Beit Lahia.
  - An Israeli airstrike on the Lebanese Ba'ath Party headquarters in Ras el-Nabaa, Beirut, kills seven people, including Hezbollah spokesman Mohammed Afif. Sixteen others are wounded. Three people are also killed and 29 more injured in another airstrike in Mar Elias.
- 18 November –
  - Hezbollah launches more than 100 missiles at Israel, mainly targeting Tel Aviv, killing one person and injuring dozens of others.
  - Five people are killed and 24 others are injured in an Israeli airstrike on Zuqaq al-Blat, Beirut.
  - Hezbollah and Lebanon both agree to an American proposal for a ceasefire.
- 19 November – Three Lebanese soldiers are killed and 17 other people are injured in an Israeli airstrike in Sarafand.
- 20 November –
  - The United States vetoes a United Nations Security Council proposal for a ceasefire in Gaza, citing the proposal's not linking the ceasefire to the return of hostages taken during the conflict.
  - The United States Senate rejects three resolutions by senator Bernie Sanders that would block the sale of weapons to Israel in its war in Gaza.
  - Thirty-six people are killed and more than 50 others are injured in Israeli airstrikes in Palmyra, Syria.
- 21 November –
  - The International Criminal Court issues arrest warrants for Benjamin Netanyahu, Yoav Gallant and Hamas military commander Mohammed Deif for war crimes committed during the Gaza war.
  - Hezbollah fires a rocket barrage at northern Israel, killing one person in Nahariya.
- 22 November –
  - An Israeli airstrike targeting the Dar El Amal Hospital in Duris in the Bekaa Valley, kills the hospital director and six other health workers.
  - At least five medics are killed when Israeli airstrikes hit a multistorey building in Chyah, Beirut.
- 23 November –
  - 29 people are killed and 67 others are injured in an Israeli airstrike in Basta, Beirut.
  - Two people are killed and three others are injured in an Israeli drone strike on Tyre, Lebanon. The victims are Palestinian refugee] from the nearby Rashidieh refugee camp.
  - Israeli airstrikes across Lebanon kill 18 people, including four children, in Shmustar, Roumieh, and Bodai.
- 24 November –
  - The government approves a resolution barring government funding agencies from communicating or placing advertisements with the newspaper Haaretz following critical articles on the Israel–Hamas war and statements made by publisher Amos Schocken.
  - Israeli artillery targets a Lebanese Army base in Tyre District, killing one soldier and injuring 18 others.
  - Hezbollah launches over 300 missiles at Israel, targeting the Ashdod Naval Base for the first time and injuring eleven people.
  - At least six people are killed in Israeli attacks across the Gaza Strip, one in the Nuseirat refugee camp, two in the Maghazi refugee camp, and three in Rafah. The IDF issues a new evacuation order in Shuja'iyya, Gaza City.
  - Missing Israeli-Moldovan rabbi Zvi Kogan is found murdered in the United Arab Emirates, with three Uzbek nationals later arrested for the murder.
  - An unidentified gunman injures three police officers near the Israeli embassy in Amman, Jordan, before being shot dead.
- 25 November – Foreign ministers of the G7 nations hold a meeting in Fiuggi and Anagni, Italy, to discuss ceasefire efforts between Israel and Lebanon as well as the International Criminal Court's arrest warrants for Benjamin Netanyahu and Mohammed Deif.
- 26 November –
  - The Security Cabinet of Israel agrees to a 60-day ceasefire in Lebanon.
  - For the first time since the start of the conflict, the IDF issues evacuation orders for central Beirut, warning residents of four neighbourhoods to leave as soon as possible. Airstrikes are later carried out by the IAF across several areas of Beirut, hitting at least 20 locations and resulting in several casualties.
- 27 November –
  - A ceasefire agreement comes into effect between Israel and Hezbollah, under which both of its forces would withdraw from southern Lebanon south of the Litani River in exchange for the Lebanese army being deployed in the area.
  - Seventeen people, including one journalist, are killed in Israeli strikes on the Kamal Adwan Hospital and the Nuseirat refugee camp.
  - The Biden administration provisionally approves a $680 million military arms package to Israel, including hundreds of small diameter bombs and thousands of JDAMs.
- 28 November – Israel and Hezbollah accuse each other of violating ceasefire terms that came into action the prior day, following an Israeli airstrike on a Hezbollah missile storage facility and the IDF opening fire on suspected combatants moving into southern Lebanon.
- 29 November – A gunman injures eight people on a bus near the Israeli settlement of Ariel in the West Bank. The attack is claimed by al-Qassam Brigades.
- 30 November – Two people are killed and six more injured in three Israeli airstrikes on southern Lebanon, despite the mutually agreed ceasefire.

=== December ===
- 8 December – Prime Minister Benjamin Netanyahu orders the IDF to seize control over the buffer zone separating it and Syrian forces in the Golan Heights that had been in place since 1974 following the collapse of the regime of President Bashar al-Assad in Damascus.
- 9 December – The IDF destroys multiple vessels of the Syrian Navy following attacks on the ports of Al-Bayda and Latakia.
- 12 December – Paraguay moves its embassy in Israel to Jerusalem for the second time since relocating it to Tel Aviv in 2018.
- 15 December – Israel announces that it will close its embassy in Ireland due to what it describes as "the extreme anti-Israel policies of the Irish government". An Taoiseach Simon Harris calls the decision "deeply regrettable", while the Tánaiste Micheál Martin says that there are no plans to close the Irish embassy in Israel.
- 21 December – A rocket fired from Yemen hits Tel Aviv, injuring 16 people.

== Holidays ==
- 23 April – Passover
- 29 April – Seventh day of Passover
- 14 May – Independence Day
- 12 June – Feast of Shavuot
- 3 October – Rosh Hashanah
- 12 October – Yom Kippur
- 17 October – Sukkot
- 24 October – Simchat Torah

== Art and entertainment ==
- List of Israeli submissions for the Academy Award for Best International Feature Film

== Deaths ==
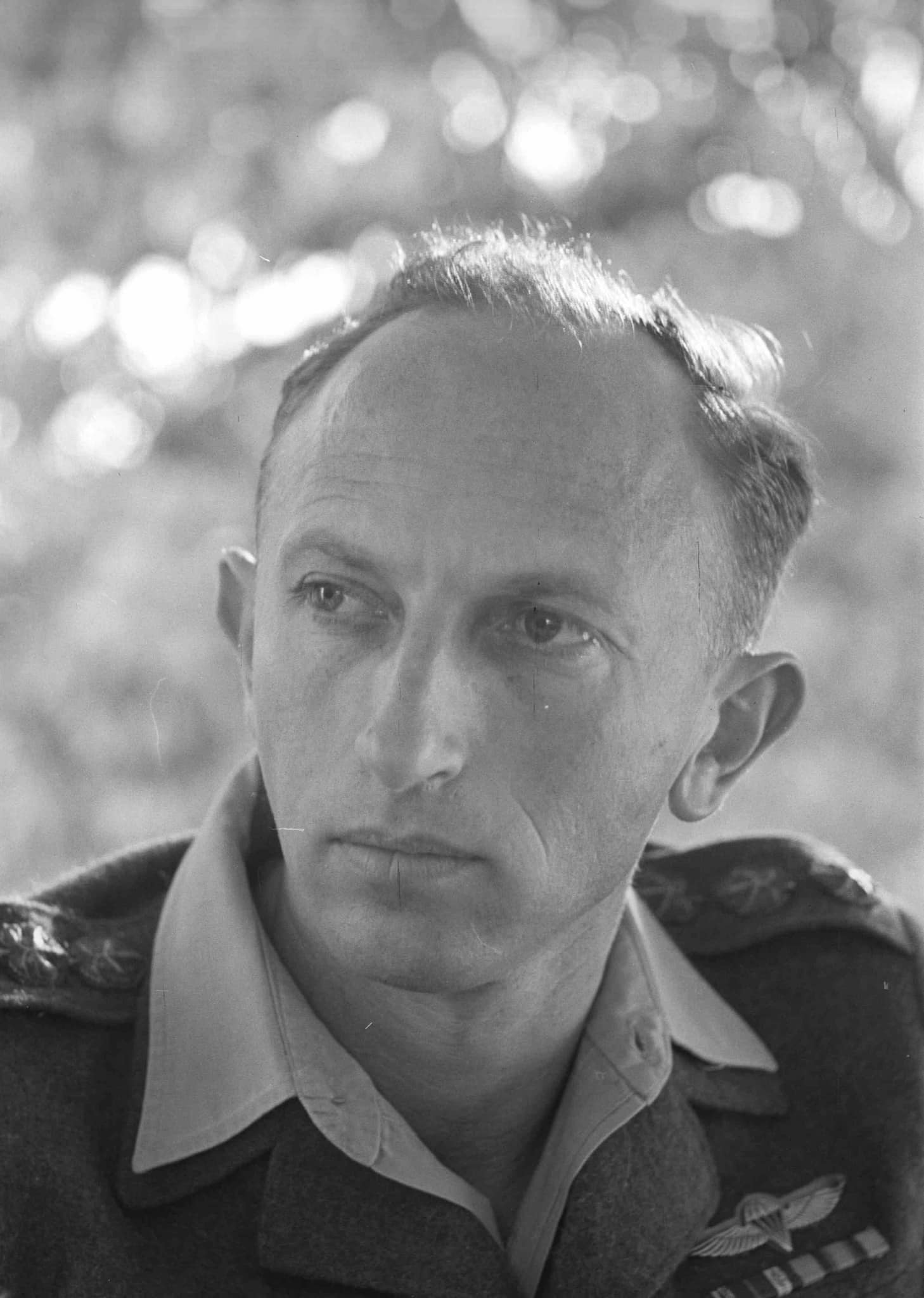
Zvi Zamir

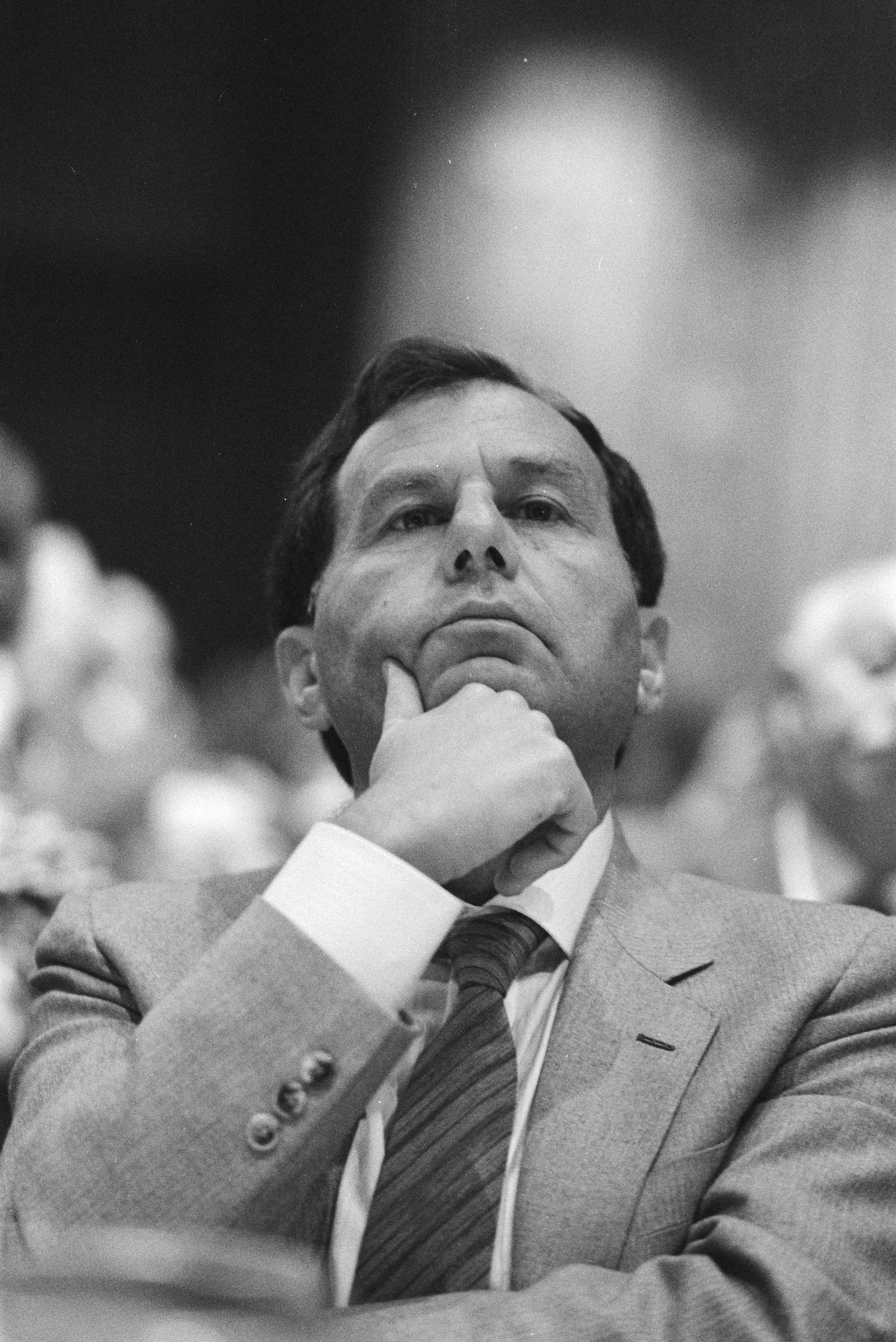
Amnon Rubinstein

- 2 January – Zvi Zamir (b. 1925), soldier in the Palmach and officer in the Israel Defense Forces, director of the Mossad (1968–1974).
- 6 January – Sabetai Unguru (b. 1931), historian of mathematics and science, professor, and director of the Institute for the History and Philosophy of Science and Ideas at Tel Aviv University.
- 13 January – Ran Poliakine (b. 1967), business, wireless power industry executive, founder of Powermat Technologies.
- 15 January – Dror Kashtan (b. 1941), football player (Hapoel Petah Tikva, national team) and manager (national team).
- 18 January – Amnon Rubinstein (b. 1931), politician, MK (1977–2002), minister of communications (1984–1987) and education (1993–1996), winner of the Israel Prize for Legal Studies (2006).
- 19 January – Raymond Apple (b. 1935), Australian-Israeli rabbi.
- 22 January – Lior Lubin (b. 1977), basketball player (Ironi Ramat Gan, Maccabi Tel Aviv, Hapoel Tel Aviv) and coach.
- 25 January – Bat-Sheva Dagan, (b. 1925), Polish-Israeli Holocaust survivor, educator and author.

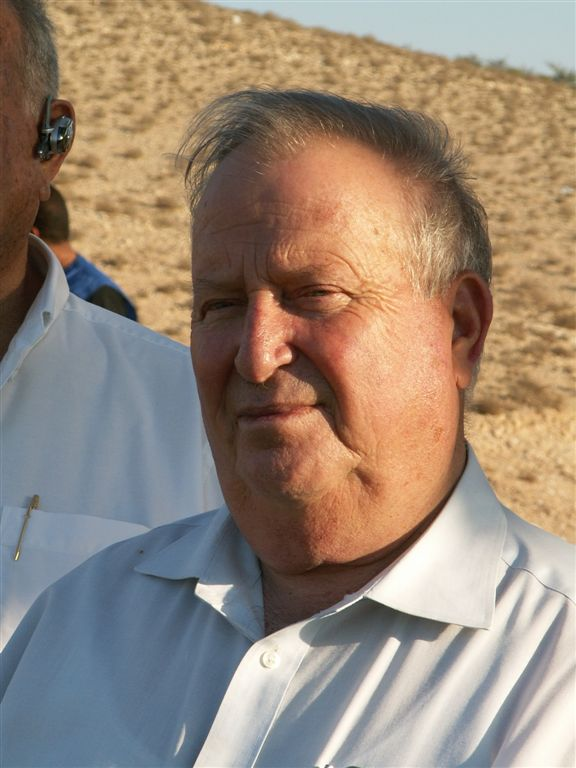
Avraham Shochat

- 2 February – Baruch Weisbecker, (b. 1940), Haredi rabbi.
- 10 February – Yoram Dinstein, (b. 1936), scholar.
- 14 February – Dani Koren, (b. 1945), politician, member of Knesset (2006).
- 18 February – Emile Shoufani, (b. 1947), Melkite Greek Catholic archimandrite, educator and activist.
- 24 February – Charlie Biton, (b. 1947), social activist and politician, MK (1977–1992).
- 28 February – Avraham Shochat, (b. 1936), politician, minister of finance (1992–1996, 1999–2001).

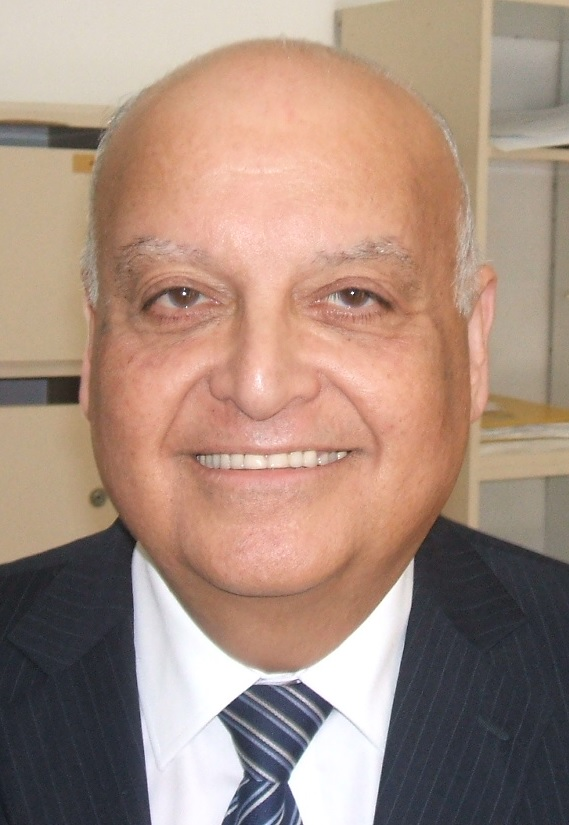
Salim Joubran

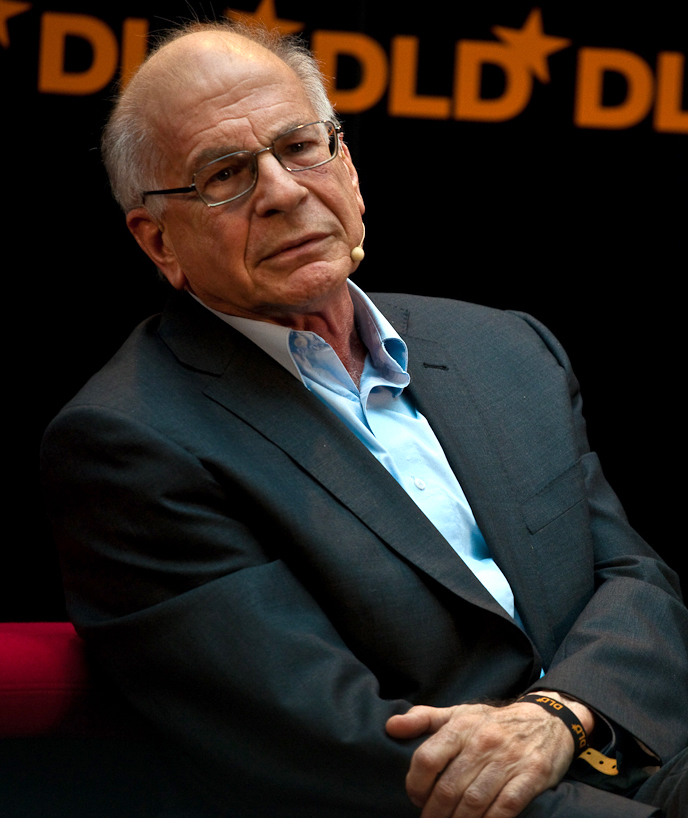
Daniel Kahneman

- 4 March – Amnon Weinstein, (b. 1939), luthier.
- 7 March – Nili Tal, (b. 1944), journalist, film director, producer.
- 11 March – Tamar Pelleg-Sryck, (b. 1926), lawyer and human rights activist.
- 14 March –
  - Eliezer Fishman, (b. 1943), businessman.
  - Joshua Zak, (b. 1929), theoretical physicist (Zak transform) and writer.
- 15 March – Salim Joubran, (b. 1947), Arab-Israeli Supreme Court judge (2003–2017).
- 24 March – Judith Hemmendinger, (b. 1923), German-born researcher and author.
- 27 March –
  - Avraham Grossman, (b. 1936), historian and professor.
  - Alfred Hassner, (b. 1930), organic chemist.
  - Sara Japhet, (b. 1934), biblical scholar.
  - Daniel Kahneman, (b. 1934), Israeli-American psychologist, author, Nobel Prize in Economic Sciences recipient (2002).
- 1 April – Sami Michael, (b. 1926), Iraqi-Israeli author and activist.
- 2 April – Yagutil Mishiev, (b. 1927), Russian-Israeli author.
- 9 April – Edna Solodar, (b. 1930), politician, member of Knesset (1982–1992).
- 15 April – Naomi Polani, (b. 1927), musical and theater director, producer, actress, singer, dancer.
- 21 April – Haim Levin, (b. 1937), footballer (Maccabi Haifa, Maccabi Tel Aviv, national team).
- 4 May – Avraham Harshalom, (b 1925), Czech-Israeli businessman and Holocaust survivor.
- 9 May – Avner Ben-Gal, (b. 1966), artist.
- 18 May –
  - Yael Dayan, (b. 1939), lawmaker, activist, member of Knesset (1992–2003).
  - Agustín Ramón Martínez, (b. 1961), Paraguayan-Israeli serial killer and fraudster.

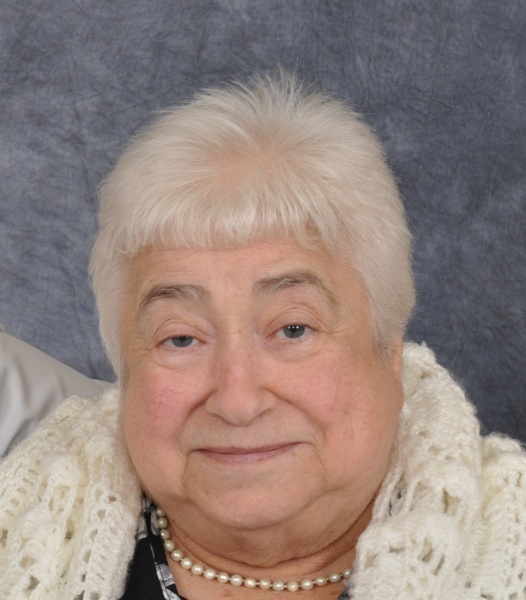
Matilda Koen-Sarano

- 2 June –
  - David Levy, (b. 1937), Moroccan-Israeli activist, member of Knesset (1969–2006).
  - Uzi Geller, (b. 1931), chess master.
- 4 June – Matilda Koen-Sarano, (b. 1939), Italian-born writer.
- 7 June – Daliyah Ya'iri, (b. 1936), journalist, author, poet.
- 20 June – Zeev Kun, (b. 1930), Hungarian-born painter.
- 22 June – Rafael Edri, (b. 1937), Moroccan-born politician, member of Knesset (1981–1999), minister without portfolio (1988–1990), minister of the environment (1990).
- 27 June – Alon Confino, (b. 1959), historian.
- 9 July –
  - Yehuda Deri, (b. 1958), Chief Rabbi of Beersheba.
  - Ana Šomlo, (b. 1935), Serbian-Israeli writer and journalist.
- 17 July – Avraham Trahtman, (b. 1944), Soviet-born mathematician and academic.
- 19 July – Eliyahu Rips, (b. 1948), Latvian-born mathematician.
- 22 July – Alex Dancyg, (b. 1948), Polish-born Israeli historian and hostage.
- 25 July – Harold Zvi Schiffrin, (b. 1922), American-born sociologist and intelligence officer (Ritchie Boys).
- 9 August – Lee Spetner, (b. 1927), American-Israeli biophysicist and creationist author.
- 11 August – Ofra Bikel, (b. 1929), Israeli-American documentary filmmaker and television producer.
- 31 August – Hersh Goldberg-Polin, (b. 2001), Israeli-American Hamas hostage.

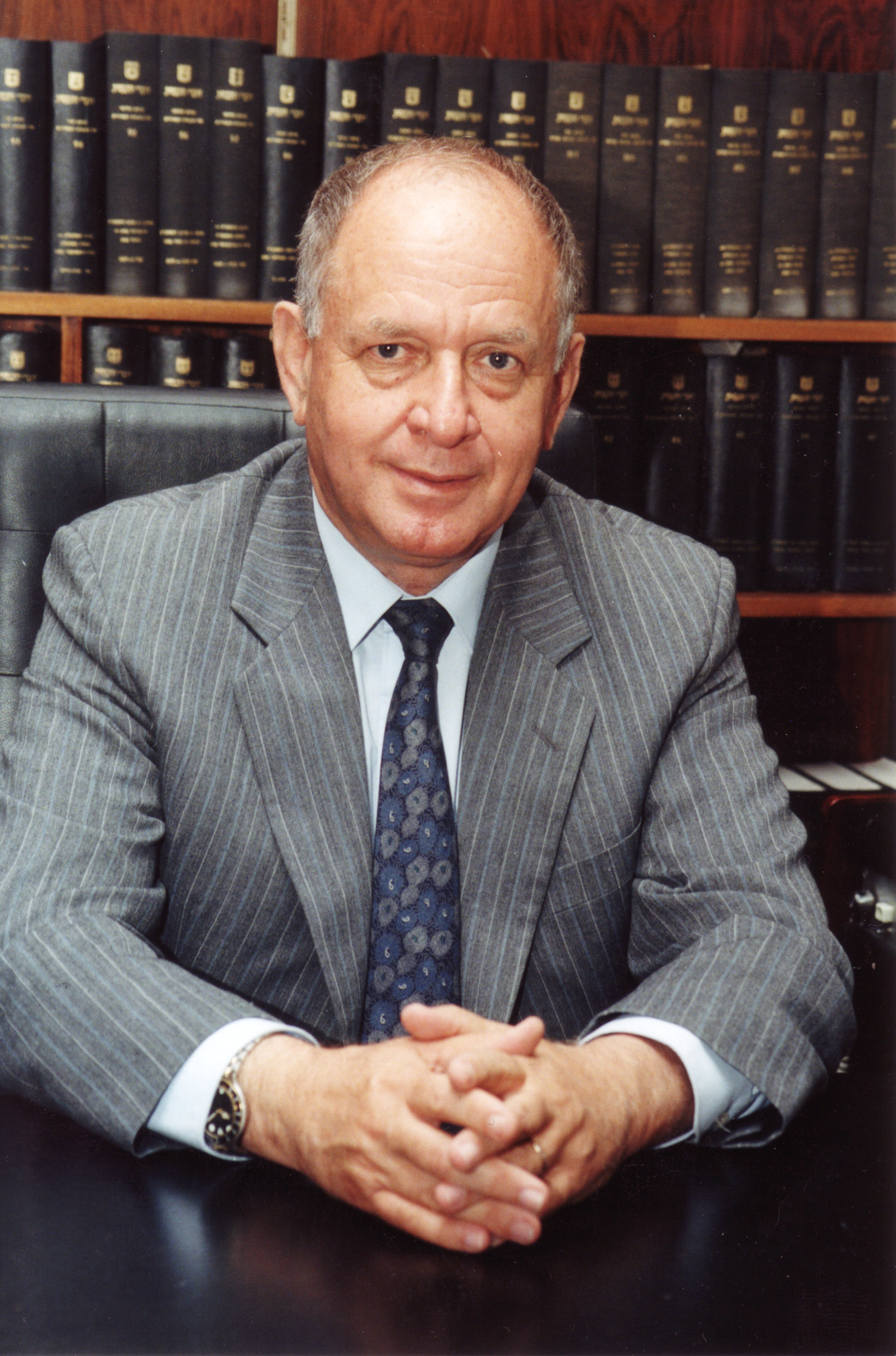
Dan Tichon

- 1 September – Naftali Hershtik, (b. 1947), Hungarian-born hazzan.
- 8 September – Ian Froman, (b. 1937), South African-born tennis player.
- 17 September – Joseph Ciechanover, (b. 1933), diplomat and civil servant.
- 23 September – Murray Greenfield, (b. 1926), American-born writer and publisher.
- 30 September – Dan Tichon, (b. 1937), Likud lawmaker (1981–1999), Speaker of the Knesset (1996–1999).

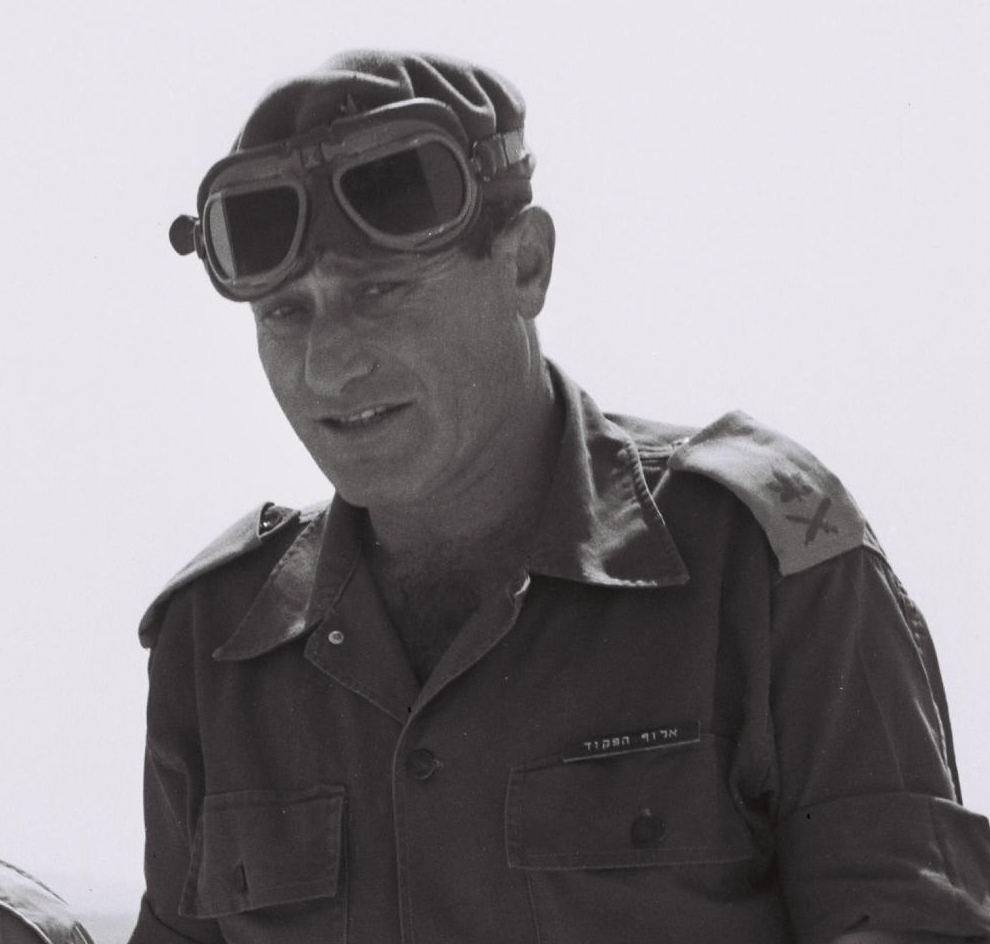
Yeshayahu Gavish

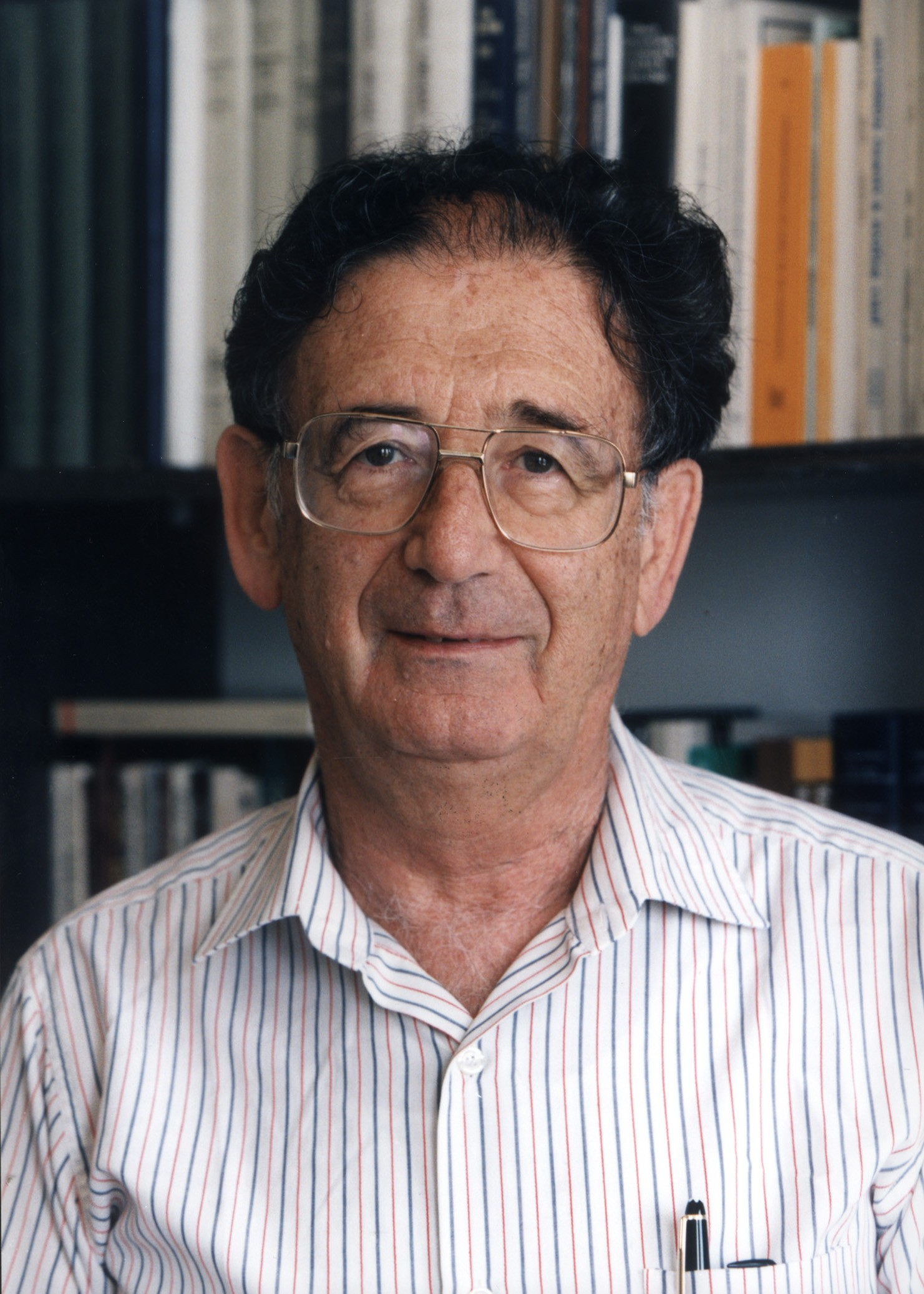
Yehuda Bauer

- 3 October – Yeshayahu Gavish, (b. 1925), general, chief commander of the Southern Command (1965–1969).
- 4 October – Chazom Chazom, (b. 1948), footballer (Hapoel Petah Tikva, Hapoel Yehud, Hapoel Ramat Gan Givatayim).
- 6 October – Shimon Kagan, (b. 1942), chess player.
- 7 October – Elhanan Tannenbaum, (b. 1946), Polish-born businessman and former hostage of Hezbollah.
- 18 October – Yehuda Bauer, (b. 1926), Czech-born Holocaust historian.
- 20 October – Ehsan Daxa, (b. 1983), Druze colonel and commander of the 401st Brigade.
- 24 October – Paul R. Mendes-Flohr, (b. 1941), American-Israeli historian and scholar.
- 27 October – Yaakov Turner, (b. 1935), air force pilot, politician, General Commissioner of the Israel Police (1990–1993), mayor of Beersheba (1998–2008).

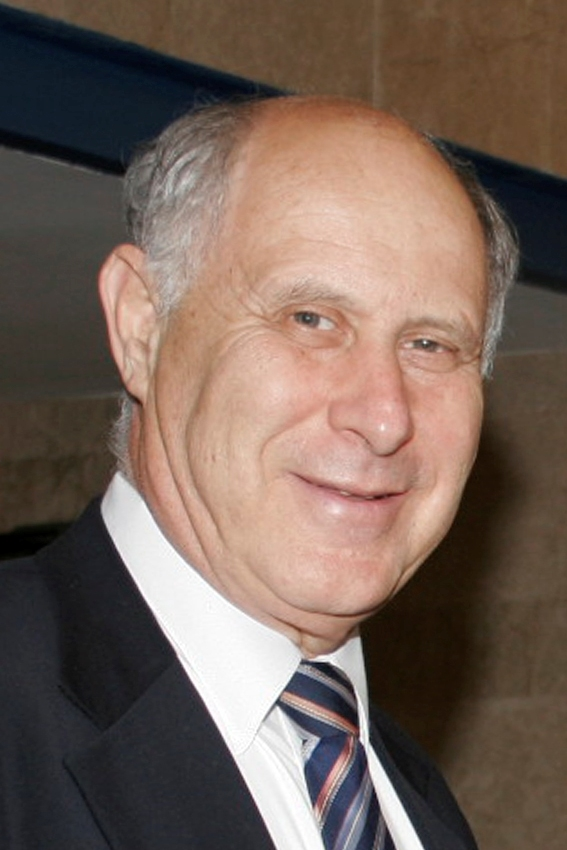
Michael Eitan

- 2 November – Yaakov Cohen, (b. 1958), Moroccan-born actor, comedian, stand-up artist.
- 6 November – Yigal Shilon, (b. 1946), television host and prankster.
- 8 November – Michael Eitan, (b. 1944), politician, member of Knesset (1984–2013), minister of science and technology (1997–1998), minister of improvement of government services (2009–2013).
- 20 November – Zhabo Erlich, (b. 1953), historian.
- 21 November – Zvi Kogan, (b. 1996), Israeli-Moldovan rabbi and Chabad emissary.
- 26 November – Shalom Nagar, (b.1936/1938), Yemeni-born prison guard, executioner of Adolf Eichmann.

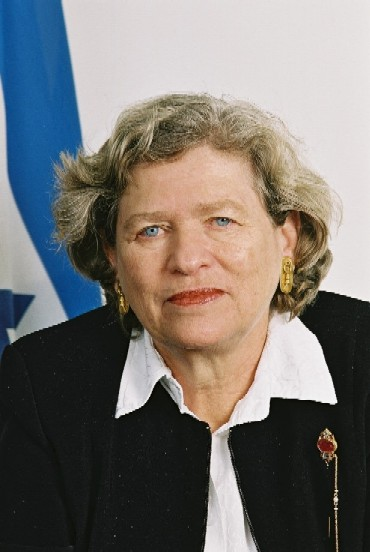
Elisheva Barak-Ussoskin

- 2 December – Eli Lancman, (b. 1936), historian.
- 9 December – Elisheva Barak-Ussoskin, (b. 1936), jurist, judge (1995–2006) and vice president (2000–2006) of the National Labor Court.
- 11 December – Corinne Allal, (b. 1955), Tunisian-born rock musician and music producer.
- 14 December –
  - Israel Charny, (b. 1931), psychologist and genocide scholar.
  - Rachel Dror, (b. 1921), German-Israeli teacher and Holocaust survivor.
- 22 December – Eduard Kuznetsov, (b. 1939), Russian-Israeli dissident, journalist, and writer, co-leader of the Dymshits–Kuznetsov hijacking affair.

== See also ==
- Timeline of the Israeli–Palestinian conflict in 2024
