= Ehsan Daxa =

Israeli army colonel (1983–2024)

- احسان دقسا
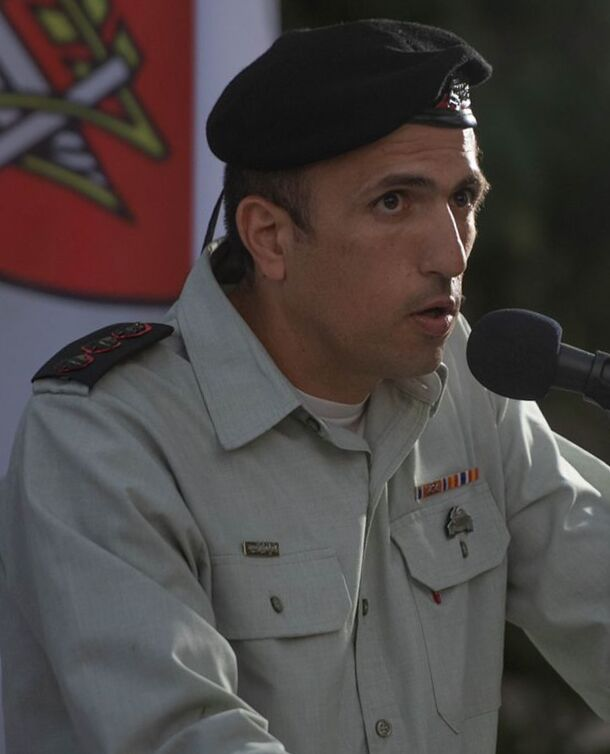
- Daxa in 2021
- Born: 19 February 1983; Daliyat al-Karmel, Israel
- Died: 20 October 2024 (aged 41); Jabalia, Gaza Strip, Palestine
- Military career
- Allegiance: Israel
- Branch: Israel Defense Forces
- Conflicts: 2006 Lebanon War: Battle of Ayta ash-Sha'b (WIA); Gaza war: Siege of North Gaza †

Ehsan Daxa (Arabic: احسان دقسا; Hebrew: אחסאן דקסה; 19 February 1983 – 20 October 2024) was an Israeli Druze army colonel and commander of the 401st Armored Brigade of the Israel Defense Forces. He was killed by an explosion in the Gaza war on 20 October 2024, at the age of 41.

== Biography ==
Daxa was born and raised in the Druze town of Daliyat al-Karmel. He enlisted in the Israel Defense Forces in 2001, joining the 7th Armored Brigade. During the 2006 Lebanon War, he served as a company commander in the 75th Battalion of the 7th Brigade. Daxa was wounded at the Battle of Ayta ash-Sha'b.

In 2024, Daxa became commander of the 401st Brigade. He was killed after the tank he was in ran into a booby-trapped explosive device in Jabalia in the northern Gaza Strip during the Gaza war on 20 October 2024. He was buried in Daliyat al-Karmel the next day. He is considered to be the highest-ranking officer to have died in ground combat since the start of the war. Meir Biderman was appointed as the acting commander of the unit.

== Personal life ==
Daxa was married and had three children.
