= Matilda Koen-Sarano =

Israeli writer (1939–2024)

- מתילדה כהן-סראנו
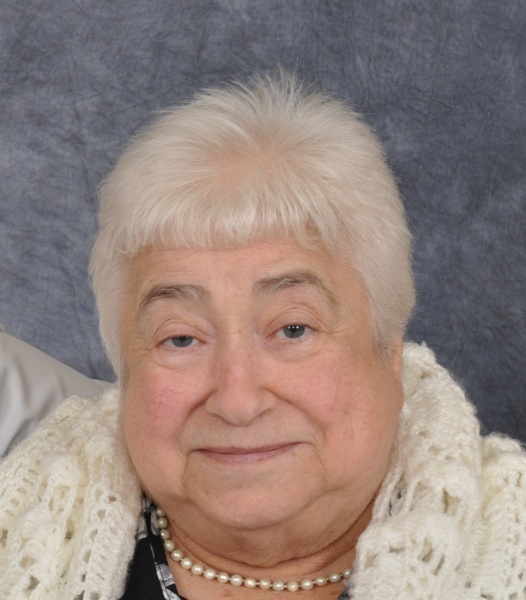
- Koen-Sarano in 2016
- Born: 31 July 1939; Milan, Italy
- Died: 4 June 2024 (aged 84)
- Education: Hebrew University of Jerusalem
- Occupations: Poet; writer

Matilda Koen-Sarano (Hebrew: מתילדה כהן-סראנו; 31 July 1939 – 4 June 2024) was an Italian-born Israeli writer. Born to Turkish Jewish parents, she was one of the most widely known writers in the Ladino language.

== Early life ==
Koen-Sarano was born in Milan on 31 July 1939, to a Sephardic family from Turkey. Her grandfather, Moshe, was born in Bergama in 1874. Her parents, Alfredo Sarano and Diana Hadjes, were both born in Aydın. Her father lived in Rhodes until 1925, while her mother in İzmir until 1938, marrying in Milan in 1938. During World War II, the family hid in the Italian mountains from the Nazi persecutions. Her father became the Secretary of the Jewish Community of Milan from 1945 until 1969. She married Aaron Koen and made aliyah in 1960.

== Career ==
Koen-Sarano studied in the Jewish Community School of Milan, and also studied languages at the Bocconi University in Milan and also Italian literature and Judaeo-Spanish literature and Judaeo-Spanish folklore at the Hebrew University of Jerusalem.

In 1960, she made aliyah. In the summer of 1979, she participated in the seminar for Ladino language radio producers held at Kol Israel. This sparked in her the desire to write in this language and to put the spotlight on everything she lived by the end of her childhood. In order to achieve this, she started interviewing several people from the Sephardic world to record and keep hundreds of folk tales and traditional stories. Besides, this activity made her return to the university as a scholar. Then she published her first book of Sephardic folk tales, named Kuentos del Folklor de la Famiya Djudeo-Espanyola (Folk Tales of the Judaeo-Spanish Family) in 1986, in Jerusalem.

In April 2009 she published her last book, Kon bayles i kantes, Sefaradis de dor en dor (With Dances and Songs, Sephardim from Generation to Generation).

Koen-Sarano taught Ladino at the Ben-Gurion University of the Negev since 1996 and a course for Ladino teachers, organized by The National Authority for Ladino and its Culture, in Jerusalem, since 1998. She also wrote Judaeo-Spanish news copy and served as a frequent contributor in Ladino at Kol Israel.

== Personal life and death ==
Koren-Sarano was a mother of three and grandmother of at least eight. Her daughter, Liora Kelman, co-authored with her the cookbook Gizar kon Gozo.

Koen-Sarano died on 4 June 2024, at the age of 84.

== Published works ==
=== Story books ===
- Kuentos del folklor de la famiya djudeo-espanyola + kaseta de kuentos, Kana, Yerushaláyim, 1986 (djudeo-espanyol/ebreo).
- Djohá ke dize?, Kana, Yerushaláyim, 1991 (dito).
- Konsejas i konsejikas del mundo djudeo-espanyol, Kana, Yerushaláyim, 1994 (dito).
- Lejendas i kuentos morales de la tradisión djudeo-espanyola, Nur, Yerushaláyim (dito), 1999.
- Sipuré Eliau Anaví, kon notas de Shifra Safra, Midreshet Amalia, Jerusalem, 1993-4 (dito).
- De Saragoza a Yerushaláyim, Ibercaja, Zaragoza, 1995 (in Ladino language).
- Storie di Giochà, in two editions:one for schools (1991) and another for the general public, Sansoni, Firenze, 1990 (in Italian language).
- Le storie del re Salomone. Sansoni, Firenze, 1993 (in Italian).
- King Solomon and the Golden Fish, with notes from Reginetta Haboucha, Wayne State University Press, Detroit, Michigan (in English ), 2004.
- Ritmo antiko, poezías i kantigas, Edisión de la Autora. Jerusalem, 2005 (djudeo-espanyol-ivrit).
- Por el plazer de kontar – Kuentos de mi vida. Selection of stories. Nur Afakot. Jerusalem, 2006 (in Ladino).
- Kuentos salados djudeo-espanyoles, Editorial Capitelum, Valencia, 2000 (in Ladino).
- Folktales of Joha, Jewish Trickster. Translation to by David Herman, Jewish Publication Society, Philadelphia 2003.
- El kurtijo enkantado, Kuentos populares djudeo-espanyoles. Nur Hafakot, (in Ladino and Hebrew), Jerusalem 2003.
- Guerta muzikal: Koleksión de piesas muzikales djudeo-espanyolas, (Sefaradís de dor en dor, Music Comedy and Radio adaptation; Maridos i mujeres, Mil i un Djohá, El novio imajinario i Tres ermanikas). Matilda Koén-Sarano, Moshé Bahar, Hayim Tsur and Avraham Reuveni. Jerusalem, 2002 (djudeo-espanyol).
- Kuentos del bel para abasho. Kuentos djudeo-espanyoles, Ed. Shalom, Istanbul 2005.
- Kon bayles i kantes, Sefaradis de dor en dor (in Ladino). 2009
- Vejés liviana, kuentos djudeo-espanyoles. Nur Hafakot, Jerusalem (in Ladino and Hebrew) (2006).

=== Scripts ===
- Sefaradís de dor en dor, music soap opera. Music by Hayim Tsur. Israeli Ministry for Education and Culture, Jerusalem., 1997, (dito). Adapted for the Radio in 1999 (dito).
- Mil i un Djohá, komedia muzikal (múzika de Hayim Tsur), Edisión de la Autora, Jerusalem 1998 (in Ladino). Translated into English by Gloria J. Ascher, U.S.A., 2003.
- Maridos i mujeres, radio soap opera in 12 sketches, music by Hayim Tsur, Edisión de la Autora. Jerusalem, 2000 (in Ladino).
- Tres ermanikas, komedia radiofónika, music of Hayim Tsur, Edisión de la Autora. Jerusalem, 2000 (in Ladino). Adapted into a play in 2004.

=== Audiobooks ===
- Viní kantaremos, koleksión de kantes djudeo-espanyoles, Edisión de la Autora, Jerusalem, 1993. Tresera edisión 2003, kuartena edisión 2006.
- Jewish Ladino Songs, Hataklit, Ramat-Gan, 1993 (five stories in Ladino) Narration by Matilda Koén-Sarano, music by Hayim Tsur.
- Nostaljía, Hataklit, Ramat-Gan, 1995 (18 stories in ladino. Narration by Matilda Koén-Sarano, music by Hayim Tsur.
- Sefaradís de dor en dor (las kantigas de la komedia muzikal), narrated by Matilda Koén-Sarano; music by Hayim Tsur. Hataklit, 1999.
- Dí ke no es tadre, 14 new stories in Ladino. Narration by Matilda Koén-Sarano, music by Avraham Reuveni. Jerusalem, 2002.
- Guerta muzikal: Koleksión de piezas muzikales djudeo-espanyolas (Sefaradís de dor en dor, Music Comedy and Radio adaptation; Maridos i mujeres, Mil i un Djohá, El novio imajinario i Tres ermanikas). Matilda Koén-Sarano, Moshé Bahar, Hayim Tsur and Avraham Reuveni. Jerusalem, 2002.

=== Language courses ===
- Kurso de Djudeo-Espanyol (Ladino) para Prinsipiantes, Ben Gurion University in the Negev, 1999. En traduksión al inglés de Gloria J. Ascher, idem 1999/2002.
- Kurso de Djudeo-Espanyol (Ladino) para Adelantados, Ben Gurion University in the Negev, 1999. (En traduksiyón, idem komo arriva).
- Kon Maymon Benchimol, Vokabulario Djudeo- Espanyol (Ladino) – Ebreo; Ebreo -Djudeo-Espanyol (Ladino), Ben Gurion University in the Negev, 1999.
- Tabelas de verbos en Djudeo-Espanyol (Ladino), Ed. de la Autora. Jerusalem, 1999.

=== Cookbooks ===
- Gizar Kon Gozo. Co-written with Liora Kelman. S. Zack. Jerusalem. 2010

=== Dictionaries ===
- Diksionario Ebreo-Djudeo-Espanyol (Ladino), Djudeo-Espanyol (Ladino)-Ebreo, (Hebrew-Ladino-Hebrew Dictionary). Zak, Jerusalem, (2010).
