= Avraham Harshalom =

Czech-Israeli businessman (1925–2024)

- אברהם הרשלום
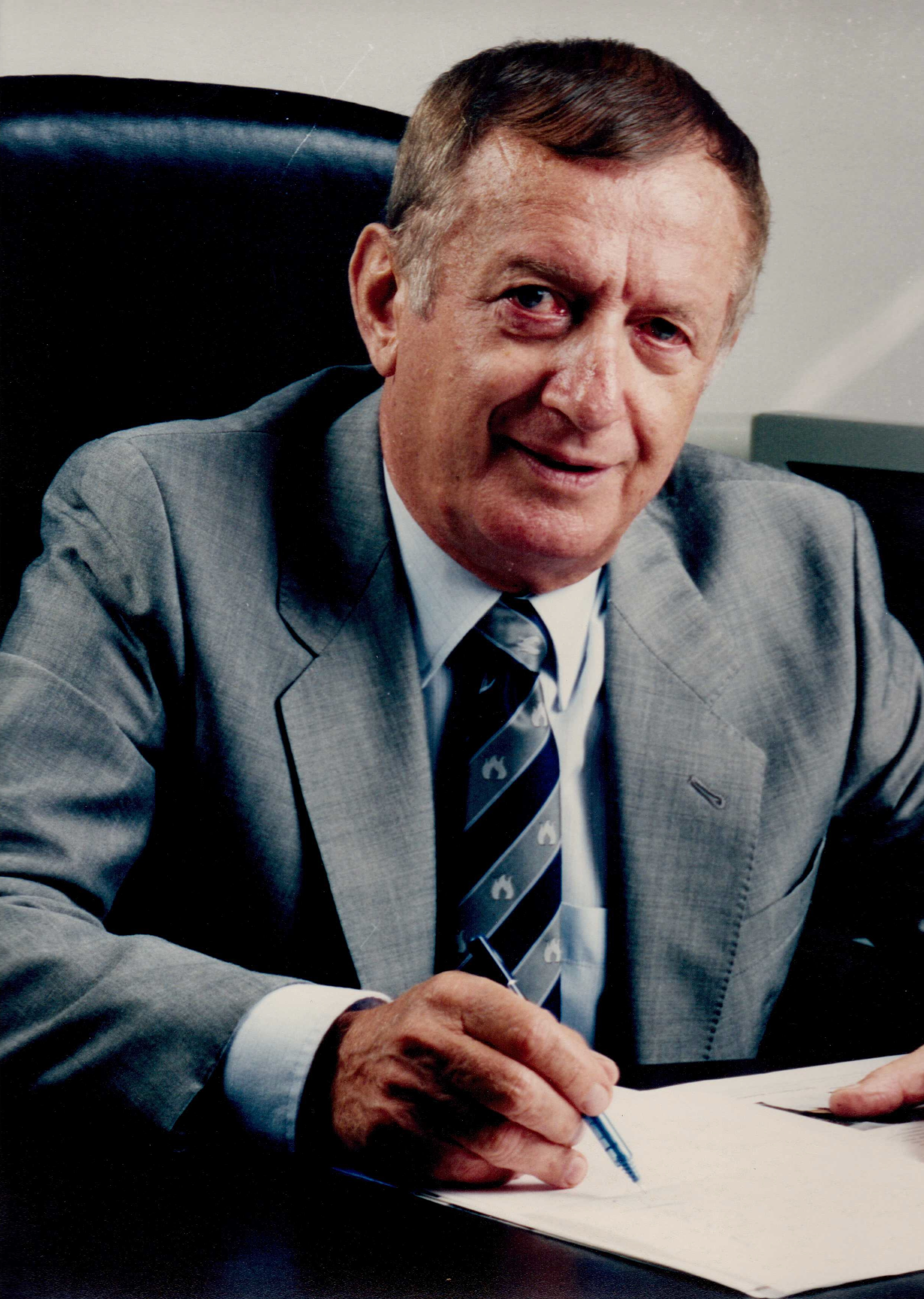
- Born: Adam Friedberg/Fridberg; 4 February 1925; Pruzhany, Second Polish Republic (now Belarus)
- Died: May 2024 (aged 99); Israel
- Occupations: Businessman (from 1951); Army pilot (1948–1950)
- Awards: Gratias Agit Award (2016)

Avraham Harshalom (Hebrew: אברהם הרשלום; born Adam Friedberg/Fridberg, 4 February 1925 – May 2024) was a Czech-Israeli businessman and a survivor of the Holocaust. Born on 4 February 1925, he died in May 2024, at the age of 99.
