= Chazom Chazom =

Israeli footballer (1948–2024)

Chazom Chazom חזום חזום
Personal information
- Date of birth: 1948
- Date of death: October 4, 2024 (aged 76)
- Place of death: Tel Aviv, Israel
- Position: Midfielder

Youth career
- 1954-1966: Hapoel Petah Tikva

Senior career*
Years	Team	Apps	(Gls)
1966–1970	Hapoel Petah Tikva	89	(4)
1970–1971	Hapoel Ramat Gan Givatayim		
1971–1972	Hapoel Petah Tikva	9	(1)
1972–1973	Grimstone Collins		
1977–1984	Hapoel Yehud		
1990	Givat Shmuel		
- * Club domestic league appearances and goals

Chazom Chazom (Hebrew: חזום חזום; 1948 – October 4, 2024) was an Israeli footballer who played as a midfielder for several teams. He is primarily associated with Hapoel Petah Tikva, where he played during the late 1960s and early 1970s, and with Hapoel Yehud, where he spent about seven seasons and contributed to the club's victory in Israel State Cup (IFA) during the 1981–82 season.

== Career ==
Chazom was born in 1948 and began playing for the Hapoel Petah Tikva youth team in the mid-1950s. At the age of 17, in 1966, he moved up to the senior team. Chazom played as a midfielder for Hapoel Petah Tikva's senior team, contributing to the club's success as runners-up in the 1965–66 Liga Leumit season and during the double season of 1966–68 Liga Leumit. During this period, the club was in its golden era and was considered strong, although it did not secure major titles. He later played with Hapoel Ramat Gan for one season before returning to Hapoel Petah Tikva for half a season.

In 1972, Chazom decided to leave Israel to play with Grimstone Collins in South Africa. He returned briefly in 1973 to serve in the Israeli Defense Forces (IDF) as a tankman during the Yom Kippur War. Afterward, he joined several other teams in South Africa before coming back to play for Hapoel Yehud, which at the time was promoted to the Liga Leumit.

In 1982, Chazom helped Hapoel Yehud win its first and only title to date—the Israel State Cup for the 1981–82 season. In 1984, he transferred to Maccabi Lazarus Holon, where he competed for promotion from Liga Alef to the National League (then the second tier of Israeli football). However, in 1985, he returned to Hapoel Yehud. Later, in the late 1990s, he played for smaller teams from lower leagues, such as Givat Shmuel in 1990, before retiring from professional football.

== Death ==
Chazom died at Tel Aviv Sourasky Medical Center on October 4, 2024, at the age of 76.
