= Disappearance of Heimnot Kassau =

2024 disappearance in Safed, Israel

Heimnot Kassau
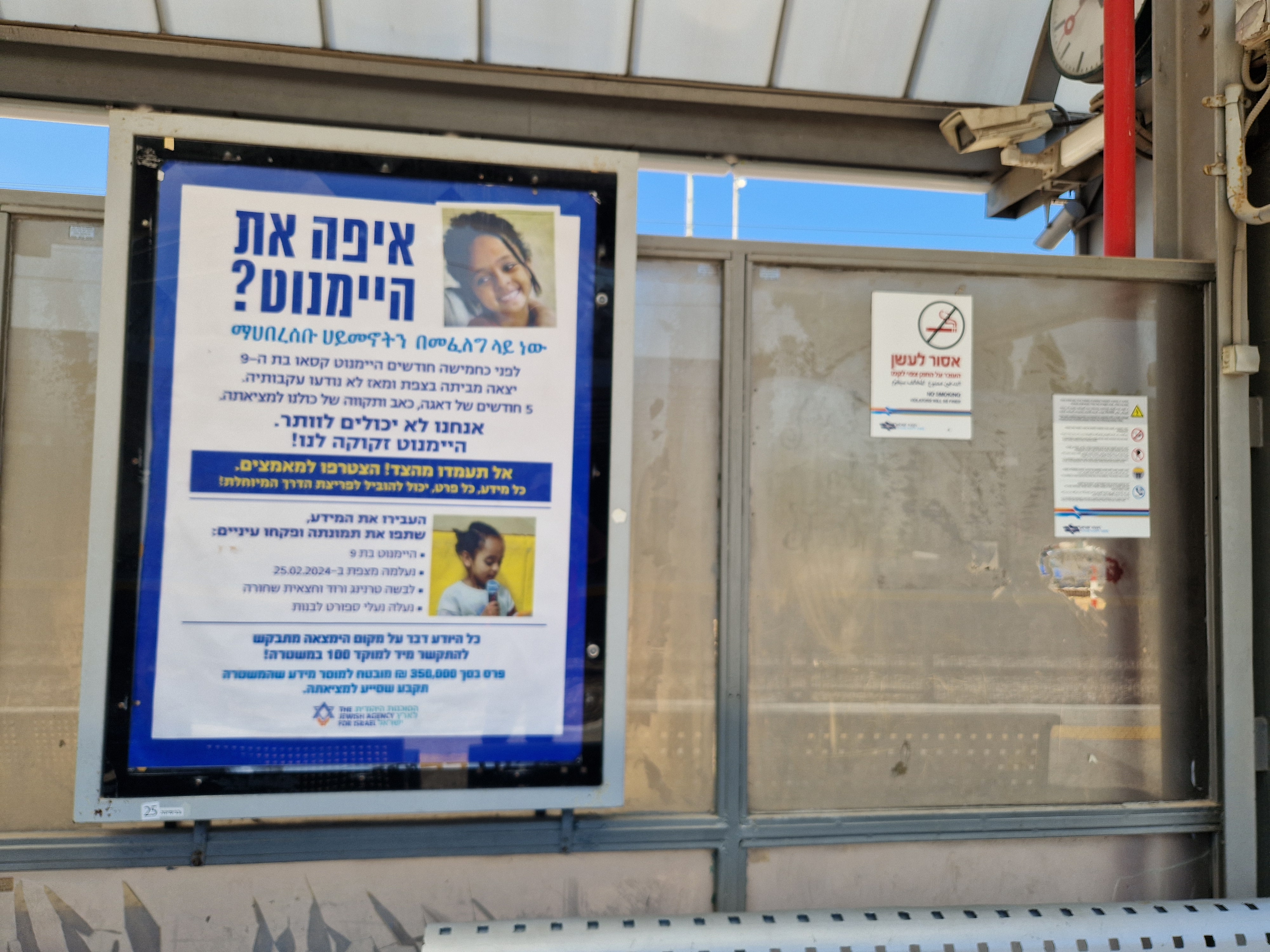
- Search poster for Heimnot Kassau at the train station in Binyamina
- Disappeared: 25 February 2024 (aged 9); Safed, Israel
- Status: Missing for 2 years, 6 months and 18 days

Haymanut Kasau, also transliterated as Heimnot Kasao, is an Ethiopian-Israeli girl who, at the age of nine, disappeared from the Safed reception center on February 25, 2024, at around 7:30 pm, after she went out with her friends to distribute flyers for one of the candidates in the city's municipal elections.

== Personal background ==
Heimnot immigrated with her family from Ethiopia to Israel about three years before the incident. She lived with her family at the reception center on 9 IDF St. in Safed.

== Disappearance ==
Heimnot's father was on a family visit to Ethiopia at the time of the disappearance, and about a week after her disappearance, he returned to Israel with the assistance of the Jewish Agency to be cleared as to not be a suspect.

== Search ==
On February 27, 2024, a leaflet document was published of Heimnot Kassau with her relatives handing out the leaflets on the streets of Safed. This is her last record. At 22:00 the police were informed of her absence, and the search for her began.

Only after about 40 hours after her disappearance, did the police deploy a search helicopter. It was stated that this was because permission of approval from the IDF was delayed, due to the escalating tensions of the Hezbollah conflict in the northern districts. On February 28, the search was extended to the Meron area as well. A police dog unit was used in the building to confirm her absence. About 1,800 volunteers joined the search during the first week of the search. After two weeks of searching, the Jewish Agency offered a reward of NIS 100,000 for information leading to her being found. In June 2024, the reward was increased to 350,000 shekels.

== Other incidents in the area ==
According to an investigation by Mako, in the years before Heimnot's disappearance, two complaints were filed about sexual abuse of children on the street where Heimnot disappeared, but no clear connection has been linked to her disappearance and the attacks.

== Investigation ==
A month after Kasau's disappearance, police reported they had investigated all potential lines of inquiry and had no clues about her disappearance.

On 17 December 2025, police extended the detention of a Beersheba man who was arrested over his alleged involvement in an attempted child abduction six days earlier after prosecutors suspected that he was connected to Kasau's disappearance.

== See also ==
- List of people who disappeared mysteriously (2000–present)
