= Daliyah Yaʼiri =

Israeli journalist (1936–2024)

- דליה יאירי דולב
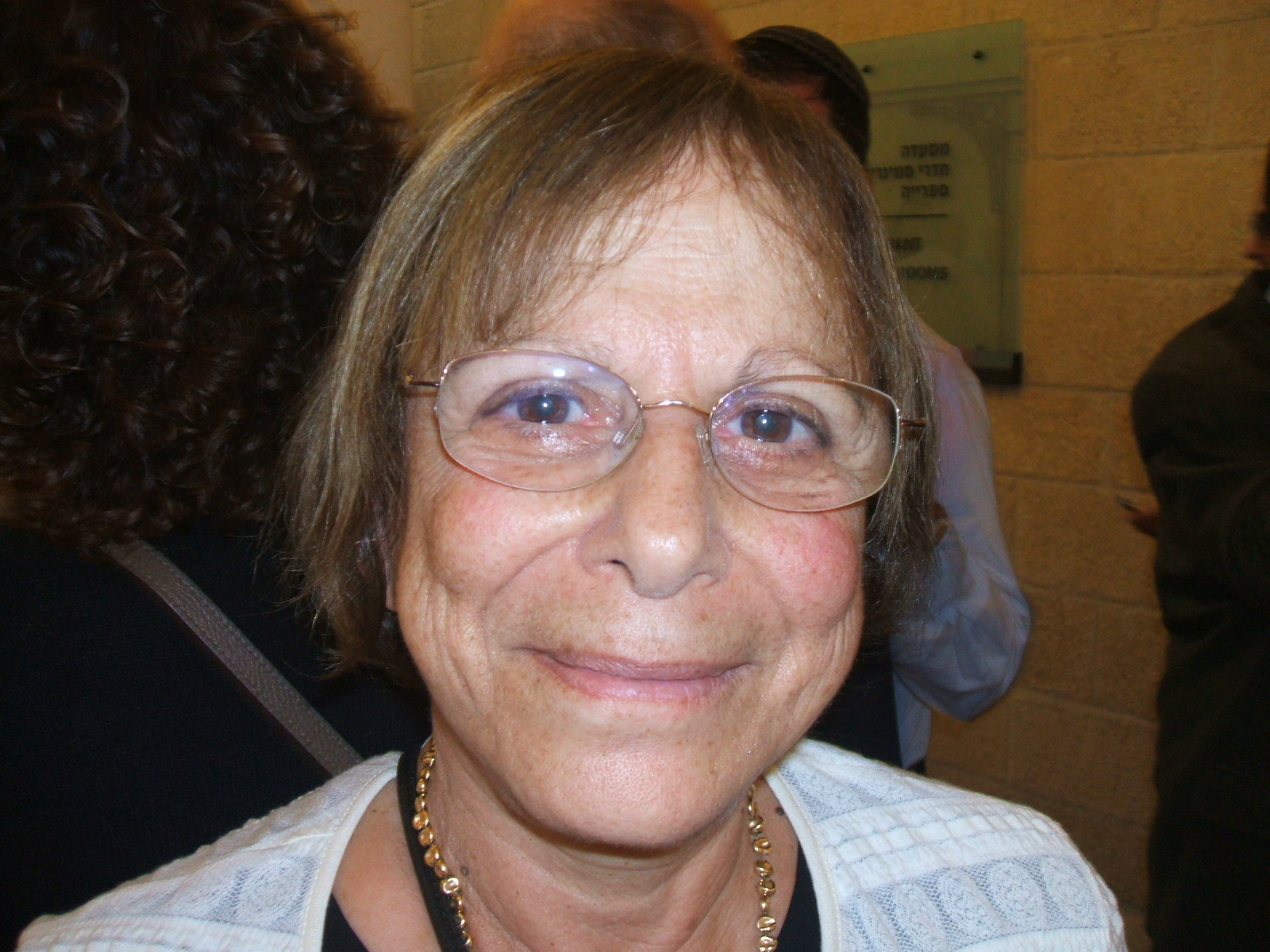
- Yaʼiri in 2009
- Born: November 23, 1936; Tel Aviv, Mandatory Palestine
- Died: June 7, 2024 (aged 87); Ramat HaSharon, Israel
- Citizenship: Israel
- Education: Hebrew University of Jerusalem
- Years active: 1962–2024
- Spouse(s): Uzi Yairi, Eran Dolev

Daliyah Yaʼiri Dolev (Hebrew: דליה יאירי דולב; November 23, 1936 – June 7, 2024) was an Israeli journalist, celebrity, writer, and poet.

== Early life ==
Dalia Yairi was born in Tel Aviv on November 23, 1936. She was the eldest daughter of Sima (Gingis) and Yaakov Tsidkoni (Rechtman). Her mother, born in Serbia, immigrated to Israel in 1921, and her father, born in Sochaczew, immigrated in 1924. Yaakov was a clerk, a collector of Israeli ethnography, and a researcher of Israeli folklore. Her father was one of the founders of YIVO.

Her family moved to Jerusalem in 1950 due to Yaakov's work with Israeli government offices.

Yairi served in the Nahal, a program in Israel Defense Forces. She also served at Kibbutz Nahal Oz. In 1956, after completing her military service, she married Uzi Yairi. She studied social work at the Hebrew University of Jerusalem and later studied at Israel Broadcasting Authority.

== Career ==
In the 1960s, Yairi began working in a current affairs program at the Israel Broadcasting Authority. Her husband Uzi was killed in 1975 during a Palestinian terror attack and hostage taking at the Savoy Hotel attack. She remarried in the late 1970s to Eran Dolev, an internist and later chief medical officer.

In 1984, Yairi joined Dolev when he was sent to the United States to teach at the US Department of Defense School of Medicine. During her stay, she studied French, communication, and international relations. Upon returning to Israel in 1986, she resumed work at the Voice of Israel as editor-in-chief and presenter of the weekly online newspaper. She also co-hosted "All Talk" with Razi Barkai.

In 1993, Prime Minister Yitzhak Rabin invited Yairi to the signing ceremony of the Oslo Accords in Washington. From 1994 to 2002, she presented the current affairs program "An Other Matter" on Channel B of Kol Israel, focusing on domestic violence and car accidents.

In 2020, she was one of the organisers of the 2020–2021 protests against Benjamin Netanyahu.

== Personal life and death ==
Ya'iri had five children and lived in Ramat HaSharon. She died there on June 7, 2024, at the age of 87.
