= Mar Elias, Beirut =

Mar Elias
- Quarter: Mousaitbeh

Mar Elias (Arabic: مار إلياس) is a street in the Mousaitbeh quarter of Beirut, the capital of Lebanon. It is considered a residential area as well as a commercial center in the western part of the city. The business sector of the street flourished from the civil war onwards, as many shop owners moved in to flee combat zones. It is a mixed Christian-Muslim neighborhood.
