= March 1980 =

Month of 1980

<<	March 1980					>>
Su	Mo	Tu	We	Th	Fr	Sa
						1
2	3	4	5	6	7	8
9	10	11	12	13	14	15
16	17	18	19	20	21	22
23	24	25	26	27	28	29
30	31

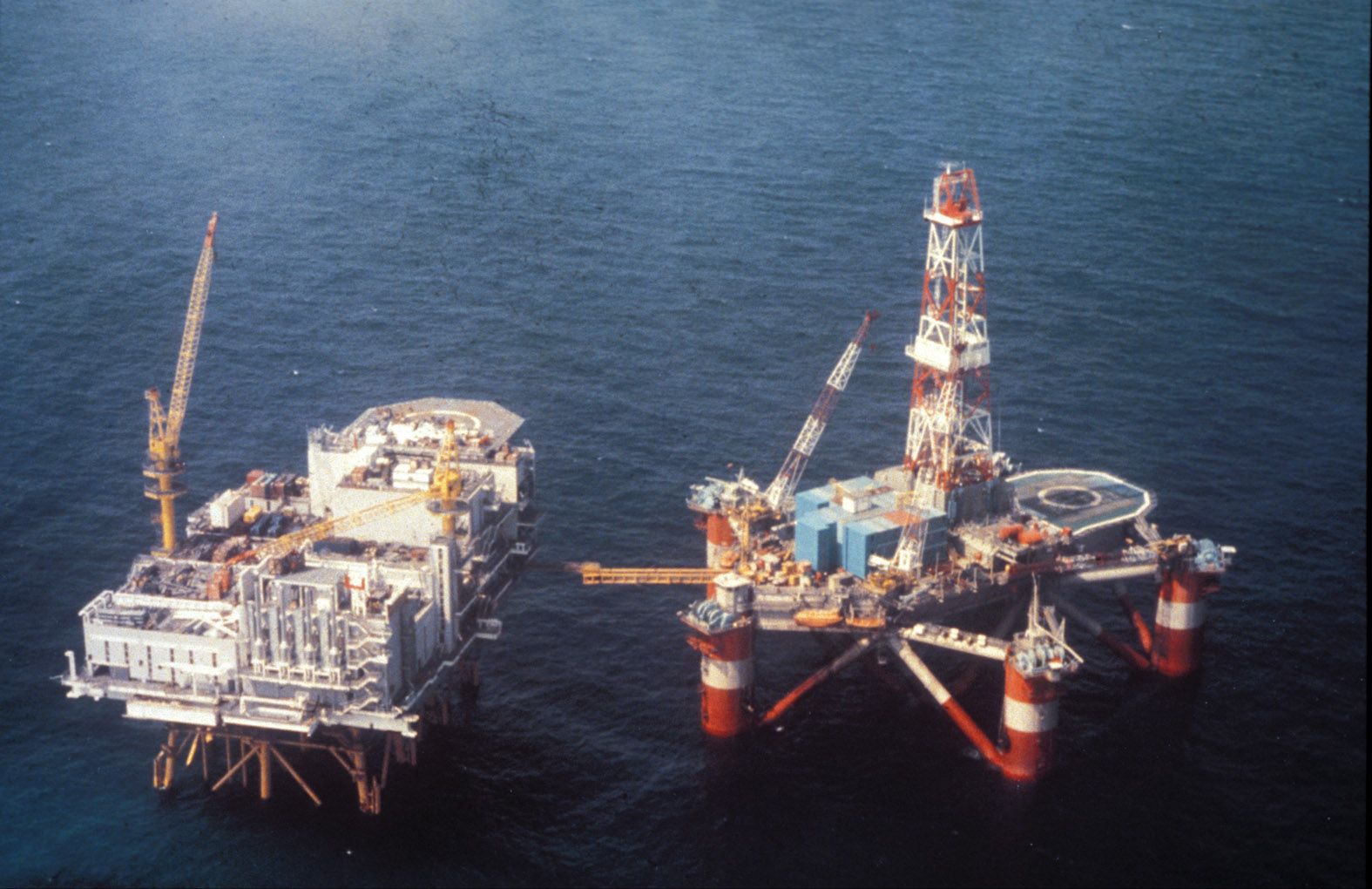
March 27, 1980: Alexander L. Kielland offshore platform (on the right), before toppling and killing 123 employees

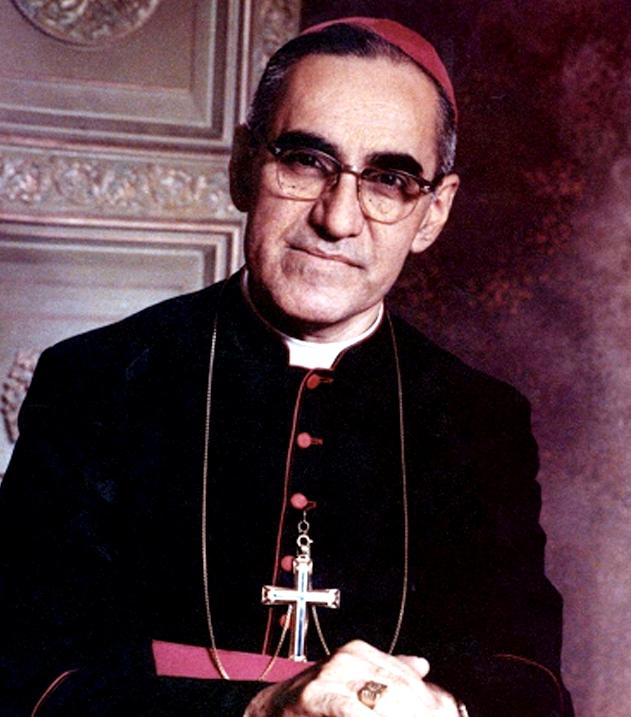
March 24, 1980: Archbishop of San Salvador Oscar Romero assassinated during Mass

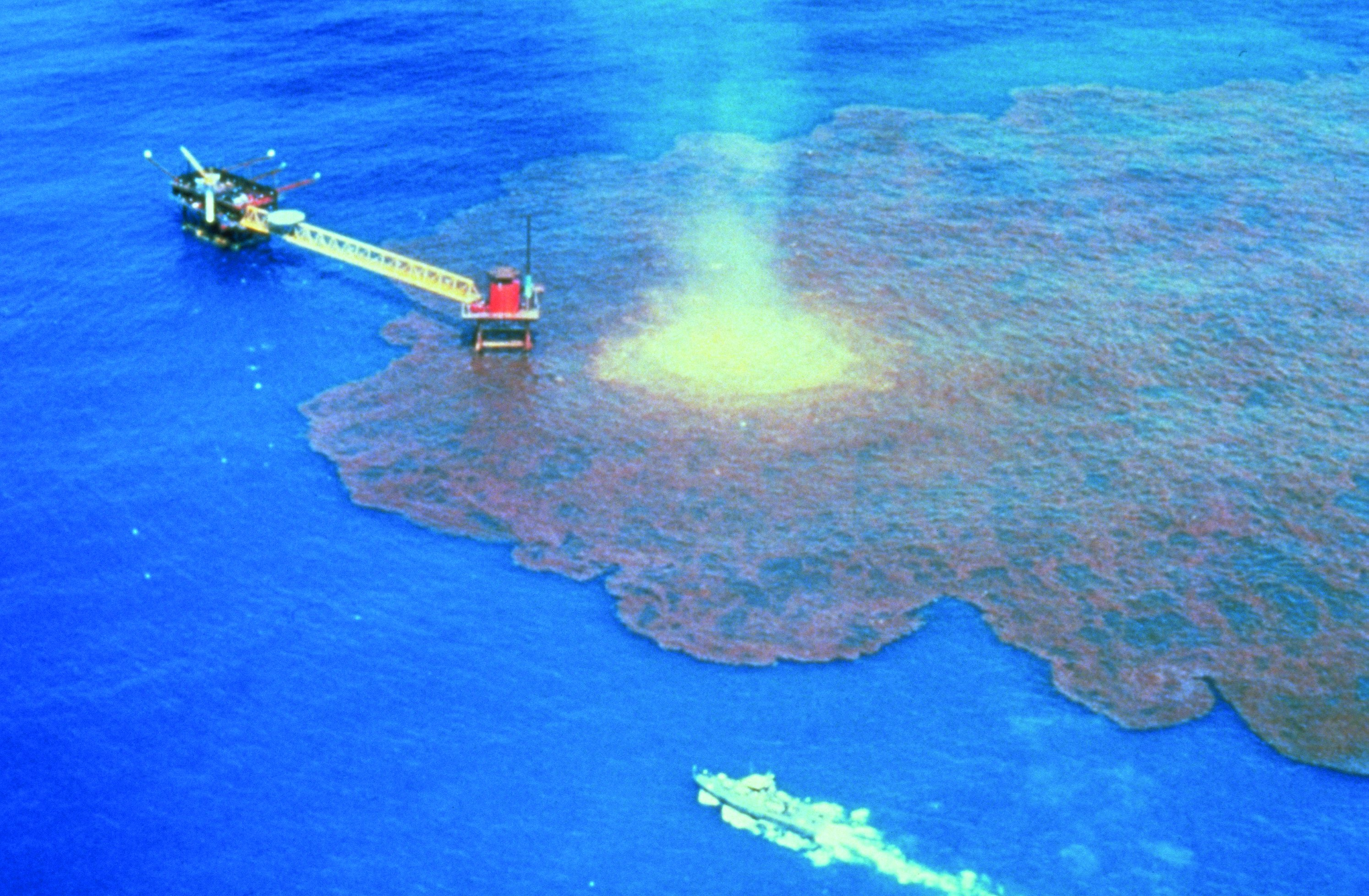
March 23, 1980: Ixtoc I oil spill capped in Gulf of Mexico

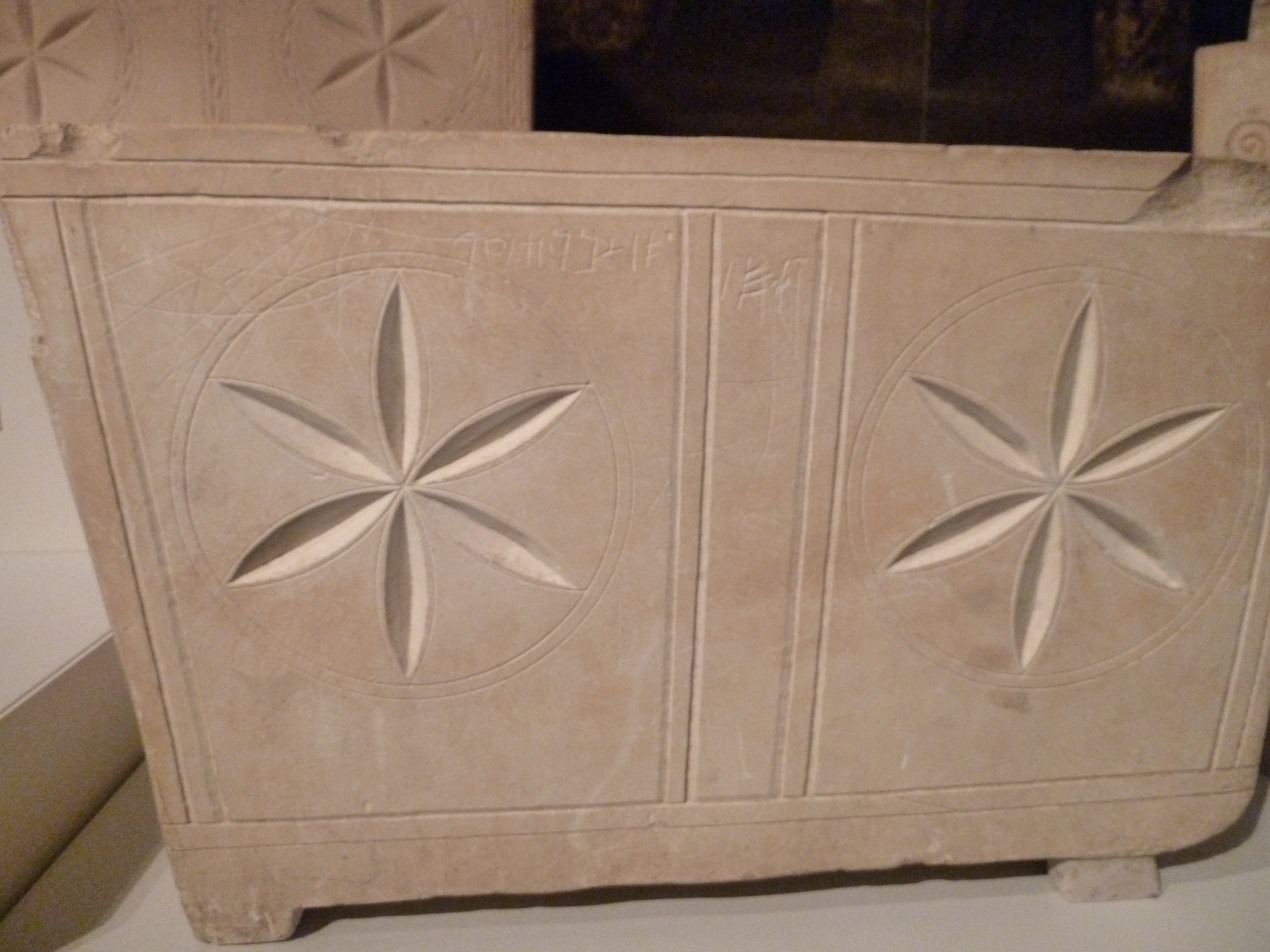
March 28, 1980: Possible tomb of Jesus discovered

The following events happened in March 1980

== March 1, 1980 (Saturday) ==
- Steven Stayner, kidnapped by Kenneth Parnell seven years earlier from his home in Merced, California, appeared at a police station in Ukiah after rescuing another kidnapped boy, Timmy White, who had been missing since February 13. Stayner had been abducted on December 4, 1972. Police arrested the kidnapper, Kenneth Eugene Parnell hours later at a Ukiah hotel where he was working as a night clerk.
- For the first time in the history of the United Nations, the United States voted against Israel in a UN Security Council resolution. The Security Council unanimously adopted United Nations Security Council Resolution 465, calling on Israel to dismantle Israeli settlements in the West Bank and other occupied territories, which Israel had acquired during the Six-Day War in 1967. U.S. Ambassador Donald McHenry cast the vote on behalf of the United States, though acknowledging that dismantling would be impractical. A spokesman for Israel's Foreign Ministry responded, using its term for the West Bank, that "Settling in Judea and Samaria is not only our right but part of our security." The resolution, sponsored by Security Council temporary members Jordan and Morocco, came after Israel had allowed Jewish settlers to move into the occupied territory of Hebron. U.S. President Jimmy Carter reversed the decision two days later, and U.S. Secretary of State Cyrus R. Vance blamed McHenry's vote on a "failure in communications."
- Died:
  - Wilhelmina Cooper, 40, Netherlands-born American model known for founding the Wilhelmina Models agency, from lung cancer.
  - Emmett Ashford, 66, the first black umpire in Major League Baseball
  - William "Dixie" Dean, 73, English soccer football forward
  - Daniil Khrabrovitsky, 56, Soviet film director

== March 2, 1980 (Sunday) ==
- Voters in Switzerland overwhelmingly rejected a proposal to separate church and state. The proposed amendment to the Swiss Constitution would have ended government sponsorship of the Protestant Swiss Reformed Church and of the Roman Catholic Church. There were 1,052,294 votes against the measure and 281,760 in favor of it.
- General Prem Tinsulanonda was elected as the new Prime Minister of Thailand by the Asian kingdom's House of Representatives, the Ratsadon. Tinsulanonda succeeded Kriangsak Chamanan, who had resigned on February 29 after disapproval of his economic policies.
- Born: Rebel Wilson, Australian comedian and actress, as Melanie Bownds in Sydney

== March 3, 1980 (Monday) ==
- The Convention on the Physical Protection of Nuclear Material, adopted by the International Atomic Energy Agency on October 26 in Vienna, was signed by nations in both Vienna and New York City, and would be ratified by sufficient nations to enter into force on February 8, 1987.
- Following the victory of his Liberal Party over the Progressive Conservative Party in Canadian elections, Pierre Trudeau returned to office as Prime Minister of Canada, taking the oath at the Government House in Ottawa. Trudeau, who had previously served as Prime Minister from 1968 to 1979, was sworn in by Marcel Masse, the Clerk of the Privy Council. Earlier in the day, Prime Minister Joe Clark sent his resignation to Governor General Edward Schreyer.
- Iran's governing Islamic Revolutionary Council announced that it would allow a five-man United Nations commission to meet with the 50 American diplomats held captive at the besieged U.S. Embassy in Tehran. Iran's leader, the Ayatollah Khomeini had overruled the militant students who had earlier refused to allow the UN panel to meet the hostages.
- José Napoleón Duarte, in exile in Mexico since 1968, returned to El Salvador and replaced Héctor Dada Hirezi on the five-member Revolutionary Government Junta (Junta Revolucionaria de Gobierno or JRG) and took office as the Central American nation's Foreign Minister. By December 13, Duarte became the first President of the Junta.
- The Audi Quattro, a four-wheel drive sporting coupe, was launched in West Germany.
- The first ShowBiz Pizza Place restaurant opened in Kansas City, Missouri, launched by Robert L. Brock, who had been a holder of a Chuck E. Cheese Pizza Time Theatre franchise. In 1984, ShowBiz would acquire the Chuck E. Cheese stores and, in 1990, rename its restaurants with the Chuck E. Cheese brand name.
- The controversial television show That's Incredible!, which showcased people performing dangerous stunts, premiered on the ABC network in the U.S. and began a five-season run. It was hosted by John Davidson, Fran Tarkenton, and Cathy Lee Crosby. Criticized as a copy of the popular NBC show Real People, or the 1950s series You Asked for It, the series captured its time slot on the first evening. As syndicated critic Peter J. Boyer noted about the stunts, the series opener was "a filmed feature on some guy who works with bees" who "let a bee sting him for the cameras, as everyone on stage gushed 'That's incredible!'". Boyer added "No one within microphone range offered 'That's Stupid!'"
- American tennis player John McEnroe reached the ATP's #1 player in the world ranking for the first time in his career. Between 1980 and 1985, McEnroe would be the #1 ranked player on multiple occasions for 170 weeks out of 260.

== March 4, 1980 (Tuesday) ==
- A conspiracy, led by Pakistani Army Major General Tajammul Hussain Malik, to assassinate Pakistan's President Muhammad Zia-ul-Haq during the annual March 23 Pakistan Day Parade, was foiled. Malik and his co-conspirators were sentenced to life imprisonment, but would be released after Zia's death in 1988.
- The first civilian killings known as the "Río Negro massacres" took place in a chapel of the Guatemala village of El Oratorio, when members of the Guatemalan Army shot seven people identified as opponents to the construction of the Chixoy Hydroelectric Dam. Located on the banks of the Rio Negro River in the Baja Verapaz Department, El Oratorio was one of the communities whose residents, mostly indigenous Maya peoples, the Achi, were forcibly relocated. According to a 2005 petition to the Inter-American Commission on Human Rights, as many as 5,000 people were killed over a period of two years, most notably on March 13, 1982, when 440 men, women and children were shot in the village of Río Negro.
- The Walt Disney Company entered the video rental business for the first time, as VHS videotapes of 13 of its films were authorized for rental by the Fotomat film developing kiosks nationwide. Among the video rentals were Davy Crockett, King of the Wild Frontier, The Love Bug and the more recent Disney release, The Black Hole.
- A little-known candidate, U.S. Representative John B. Anderson of Illinois, won the Massachusetts primary election for the Republican Party nomination, ahead of former U.S. Representative George Bush and former California Governor Ronald Reagan. Teddy Kennedy, the U.S. Senator for Massachusetts, won 66% of the vote in his home state with twice as many votes as U.S. President Carter. Anderson would later run as a third-party candidate for the U.S. presidency.
- The West German TV mystery series, Anderland premiered on the ZDF television network as an entertaining and informative program for children. It would run for 45 episodes until December 14, 1986.
- Born:
  - Jeong Da-bin, South Korean TV actress (committed suicide, 2007)
  - Omar Bravo, Mexican soccer football forward and national team member, in Los Mochis
- Died: Salim Lawzi, 57, Lebanese journalist and publisher of the weekly magazine Al Hawadeth, was found dead nine days after being kidnapped. He had probably died on February 28 or February 29.

== March 5, 1980 (Wednesday) ==
- Independent Sector, an American coalition of nonprofit organizations, foundations and corporate charities, was created by a merger of the Coalition of National Voluntary Organizations and the National Council of Philanthropy.
- After losing in the New Hampshire Primary, Tennessee U.S. Senator Howard Baker became the first candidate to withdraw from the Republican race for the presidential nomination.
- Beyond Westworld premiered on CBS but ran for only three episodes before being canceled. In its final showing on March 19, it finished 69th out of 69 shows in the Nielsen ratings. It was nominated for two Primetime Emmy Awards, for art direction and for makeup.
- Born: William Owens, U.S. Navy SEAL, in Peoria, Illinois (killed in action, 2017)
- Died:
  - Jay Silverheels (stage name for Harold Jay Smith), 67, Mohawk American TV actor known for portraying Tonto in The Lone Ranger
  - Marc Edmund Jones, 91, American astrologer

== March 6, 1980 (Thursday) ==
- Edwin H. Land, who had founded the Polaroid company that was a major manufacturer of cameras and film, and a pioneer in self-developing photographs, resigned as its CEO after the corporation's loss of money from attempting to market the Polavision video camera system. Among the problems with Polavision was that, although films could be seen soon after they had been made, the film could not be reused.
- The Iranian students who had held the U.S. Embassy diplomats hostage since November announced that they were ready to turn their captives over to the control of Iran's government. The students then made new demands the following day.
- Colombian terrorists, who had seized the Dominican Republic's Embassy and taken 15 ambassadors hostage, released one of their captives, Austrian Ambassador Edger Selzer, whose wife was terminally ill in Vienna.
- Died:
  - Barbara Brukalska, 80, Polish architect and exponent of functionalism
  - Park Heung-ju, 40, was shot by a firing squad, becoming the first of the co-conspirators to be executed for the October 26 assassination of President Park Chung Hee. The other five would be hanged on May 24.

== March 7, 1980 (Friday) ==
- CovertAction Information Bulletin, an American periodical opposed to spy agencies, revealed the identity of 39 agents of the Central Intelligence Agency (CIA), publishing the names and biographies of 16 CIA station chiefs and 23 other senior officers, including some in Moscow and Beijing.
- Born:
  - Laura Prepon, American television actress; in Watchung, New Jersey
  - Murat Boz, Turkish singer and TV actor; in Karadeniz Ereğli

== March 8, 1980 (Saturday) ==
- The "Spring Rhythms Festival" (Festivalya Vesennye Ritmy), also known as "Tbilisi-80", began in Tbilisi, capital of the Georgian SSR as the Soviet Union's first approved rock music festival and would run for nine consecutive days.
- Iran began the break off diplomatic relations with neighboring Iraq, recalling its ambassador from the Iraqi capital, Baghdad, and expelling Iraq's ambassador from Tehran. The next day, Iraq announced that Iran's ambassador in Baghdad, Mohammed Duaei, was persona non grata. Both nations allowed relations to continue at the chargé d'affaires level. The two nations would go to war on September 22.
- Jaime Roldós, the President of Ecuador, announced his National Development Plan to advance the nation's economy over a period of years.
- Busan Kyungsang College opened to students in Busan, South Korea. Its first graduation ceremony would be on February 13, 1982.
- A group of 50,000 Brazilians gathered at the village of Casimiro de Abreu after a local farmer had told a national TV audience that a flying saucer from Jupiter would land on his farm at dawn. The saucer did not arrive as scheduled, and the crowd dispersed peacefully.
- A plan to release the U.S. Embassy hostages in Iran was rejected by the Iranian students who were holding the diplomats hostage in Tehran.

== March 9, 1980 (Sunday) ==
- Cyclosporin A, the immunosuppressive drug which would revolutionize organ transplantation by eliminating the danger of the body's rejection of the transplanted organ, was first tested on a human being. The first person to receive the drug was a 28-year-old patient of Dr. Thomas Starzl at the University of Pittsburgh Medical Center. The test was successful and the drug was approved for clinical use in the United States in 1983.
- Syrian troops killed more than 200 anti-government protesters in the northwest Syrian city of Jisr al-Shughur, after Ba'ath Party offices and Syrian Army barracks had been attacked earlier in the day. Helicopters loaded with troops landed in the city of about 45,000 people, and a door-to-door search of houses followed, with some agitators killed on site, and others arrested and brought before military tribunals. Troops also killed 30 protesters in Ma'arra and 16 in Idlib.
- Pedro Alonso López, a serial killer from Colombia who confessed to raping and strangling over 100 children over a seven-year period, was arrested in Ecuador in the city of Ambato. López was picked up by police after attempting to kidnap a young girl in a market place. After being apprehended, he led police to the burial sites of 28 of his victims.
- The first elections for the Basque Parliament, the 60-member legislature created by Spain for the new Basque Autonomous Community, were held. The Basque Nationalist Party won a plurality of the seats. The 1979 act provided for the region consisting of the provinces of Álava, Biscay, and Gipuzkoa to be granted internal government.
- Born:
  - Volker Bruch, German television actor; in Munich
  - Chingy (stage name for Howard Bailey Jr.), American rapper and actor; in St. Louis
  - Matthew Gray Gubler, American TV actor; in Las Vegas
  - Anna Clyne, English composer; in London
- Died:
  - Nikolay Bogolyubov, 80, Soviet film actor
  - Heinz Linge, 67, personal valet to Adolf Hitler who claimed to have been the last person to see Hitler and Eva Braun on the day of their suicides

== March 10, 1980 (Monday) ==
- The Berber Spring, protests began against the government of Algeria by the Berber minority that makes up about one-fourth of Algeria's population, in their homeland, the Kabylia region on the northeast coast. The triggering event was the cancellation of a Kabyle language poetry reading by Mouloud Mammeri at the University of Tizi Ouzou.
- Rádio e Televisão de Portugal (RTP-1), which had started TV broadcasting on March 7, 1957, introduced color television broadcasting to Portugal.
- At Rancho Mirage, California, the National Football League held its annual meeting, where 22 of the NFL's 28 teams voted unanimously against allowing the Oakland Raiders to move to Los Angeles. The Raiders did not participate and the owners of five teams (Cincinnati, the Los Angeles Rams, Miami, Philadelphia and San Francisco) abstained. Team owner Al Davis announced that he reserved the right to ignore the vote and to move the team anyway, a move which would take place in 1982 after his suit against the league. In the years that followed the Oakland Raiders moved to Los Angeles, then back to Oakland in 1995, then to Las Vegas in 2020. Six of the other teams in 1980 would relocate, and others would threaten to do so unless they received concessions from the cities where they operated.
- Died: Dr. Herman Tarnower, 69, American cardiologist and dietician famous for the high-protein, low-fat Scarsdale diet, was murdered by his former lover, school executive Jean Harris, who claimed that the death was an accident during her own suicide attempt

== March 11, 1980 (Tuesday) ==
- Thirty-six of the 43 crew on the Spanish oil tanker MV María Alejandra were killed when the ship broke apart after a natural gas explosion and sank within 40 seconds. On its way from the Canary Islands to be filled with crude oil from the Persian Gulf, the ship went down 100 miles (160 km) west of Cap Blanc, Mauritania. With no time to put on life jackets, the seven survivors jumped into the ocean and hung on to floating debris, long enough to be rescued by a Greek-registered frigate Luehesand.

Papua New Guinea

- Michael Somare, the first Prime Minister of Papua New Guinea, resigned after losing a vote of confidence, 57 to 49, in the south Pacific nation's National Parliament. He was succeeded by Julius Chan. Somare would become Prime Minister again in 1982.
- The 500-member Azanian People's Liberation Army, organized by South African guerrilla Potlako Leballo in 1961 to overthrow the white minority government of South Africa, split into several factions after a mutiny at the APLA's camp in the Tanzanian district of Chunya.
- Born: Gabriela Pichler, Swedish film director, in Huddinge
- Died: Maud Hart Lovelace, 87, American children's author known for the Betsy-Tacy series of books

== March 12, 1980 (Wednesday) ==
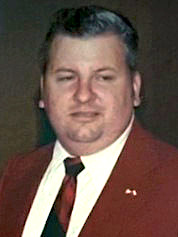
Gacy

- Serial killer John Wayne Gacy was convicted of 33 counts of murder of young men and boys between 1972 and 1978. A jury in Chicago deliberated for 1 hour and 50 minutes before finding him guilty. The jury recommended a death sentence Gacy would be executed by lethal injection on May 10, 1994.
- At Linz, in Austria, the International Federation for Systems Research was founded by the cybernetic systems research organizations of the United States, Austria and the Netherlands.
- The Société Nationale des Hydrocarbures (SNH), the government-owned oil and gas company for the West African nation of Cameroon, was established to work with foreign oil companies to manage the sale of the nation's petroleum and natural gas resources.
- Died: Jay Anson, 58, American novelist who wrote the bestseller The Amityville Horror; following complications from heart surgery

== March 13, 1980 (Thursday) ==
- In State of Indiana v. Ford Motor Company, a jury in Winamac, Indiana acquitted the automaker in the first criminal trial in the U.S. of a corporation for homicide. Ford Motor Company was found not guilty of manslaughter in the deaths of three teenaged females from a product defect in its Ford Pinto economy cars. On August 11, 1978, Judy Ulrich, her sister and her cousin had died in a fiery crash after her 1973 Ford Pinto economy car had been struck from behind by another car. Although a conviction would have carried a maximum penalty of a $10,000 fine for each count, the evidence developed in the trial established Ford's knowledge of the defect in the design and placement of its gasoline tanks.
- Died:
  - Roland Symonette, 81, the first Premier of the Bahamas after it was granted self-government by the British
  - Lillian Ngoyi, 68, South African black nationalist known as "the mother of black resistance"
  - Nettie Rosenstein, 90, American fashion designer who popularized the little black dress style

== March 14, 1980 (Friday) ==
- All 87 people on board LOT Polish Airlines Flight 7, including the 14-member U.S. amateur boxing team and 42 citizens of Poland, were killed when the flight from New York crashed short of the runway during an emergency landing attempt at Warsaw. The Ilyushin Il-62 jet airliner had departed New York City the night before at 9:18. A turbine disc on the jet had failed, from metal fatigue, in the number 2 engine of the Ilyushin Il-62, causing the engine to fall apart. Debris then damaged the jet's rudder and its elevator control lines, causing it to dive into the ground 800 metres (2,600 ft) from the runway at 11:14 in the morning local time The main part of the fuselage fell into a 14 foot (4.3 m) deep pond that had been frozen over.
- The first round of voting for the Majlis, the 270-member Islamic Consultative Assembly that served as Iran's Parliament. A second round, for seats that had no candidate receiving 50% or more of the vote, took place on May 9.
- The Grob G 109, manufactured by the West German Grob Aircraft Company as the first all-composite motor glider, flew for the first time.
- U.S. President Carter signed legislation abolishing three federal government agencies whose existence was no longer necessary. The 188-year-old United States Assay Commission, formed in 1792 to supervise the testing of gold and silver in U.S. Mint coins, had served no purpose after the passage of the Gold Reserve Act of 1934 and the Coinage Act of 1965, and as Carter noted, "the United States no longer produces gold or silver coins of equivalent value." The U.S. Marine Corps Memorial Commission had continued to exist even after it had completed its plan to create a plan for a memorial in Chicago's Grant Park, and the Low-Emission Vehicle Certification Board, created to certify low-emission federal government vehicles, had been superseded by the Electric and Hybrid Research & Development Demonstration Act of 1976.
- Died:
  - Anna Jantar, 29, Polish singer, in the crash of LOT Flight 007 on her way home from her U.S. tour
  - Félix Rodríguez de la Fuente, 52, Spanish naturalist and TV show host, in a plane crash
  - Mohammad Hatta, 77, Prime Minister of Indonesia from 1948 to 1949 and the nation's first Vice President
  - Allard K. Lowenstein, 51, political activist and former U.S. Congressman, was murdered in his office by a mentally ill friend.

== March 15, 1980 (Saturday) ==
- The Boston Globe inadvertently ran one of the most famous headline mistakes in U.S. history, when an editorial on economic proposals by U.S. president Jimmy Carter, supposed to be titled "All Must Share the Burden", carried the headline "Mush from the Wimp" instead in its early edition. Globe editorial writer Kirk Scharfenberg, who would later become the deputy managing editor, took the blame for the mistake and would note later, "I meant it as an in-house joke and thought it would be removed before publication. It appeared in 161,000 copies of the Globe the next day." The Globe corrected the blunder in the second print run of the day, and apologized three days later with a statement at the bottom of page 14 of its Tuesday editorial page, writing "The first editions of last Saturday's Globe carried a headline on the lead editorial that was inappropriate and not intended for publication. In later editions the editorial, which supported President Carter's new initiatives on the economy, was titled, 'All must share the burden.'"
- Former U.S. President Gerald R. Ford announced that he would not run for the Republican Party nomination for the 1980 U.S. presidential election, reversing earlier comments that he didn't believe that front-runner Ronald Reagan would be able to defeat President Carter.
- The nuclear-powered aircraft carrier USS Carl Vinson was launched from the shipyard at Newport News, Virginia. For the first time since 1900, the U.S. Navy named a vessel for a living person, and retired U.S. Congressman Carl Vinson of Georgia, 96 years old, was present for the launch. During his Congressional tenure from 1914 to 1965, Vinson had successfully marshaled support for building new warships for the Navy with the Vinson-Trammell Act of 1934, the Naval Act of 1938 and the Two-Ocean Navy Act of 1940.
- The Circle K Sunkus chain of Japanese convenience stores began with the opening of the first "Circle K" store in Japan, located in the Tenpaku-ku ward of the city of Nagoya. Four months later, on July 23, the first "Sunkus" store opened at the Aoba-ku ward of Sendai. The chains would merge in 2004 as Circle K Sunkus and would be rebranded in 2016 as part of the FamilyMart chain.
- Voters in the Penobscot Indian Nation voted, 234 to 113, to accept a proposed settlement of $81,500,000 to drop further claims for 12,500,000 acres of land 19,531 square miles (50,590 km^{2}), almost two-thirds of the 30,862 square miles (79,930 km^{2}) of land in the U.S. state of Maine.
- In an upset victory, Wolverhampton Wanderers F.C. defeated defending champion Nottingham Forest F.C., 1 to 0, before a crowd of 96,527 spectators at Wembley Stadium to win The Football League Cup championship. Nottingham Forest was the defending European Cup champion and was expected to easily win its third consecutive League Cup. Andy Gray scored the winning goal in the 67th minute, after Nottingham goalkeeper Peter Shilton collided with his teammate, David Needham.
- Died: Abram Grushko, 61, Soviet Russian painter

== March 16, 1980 (Sunday) ==
- Closed captioning was first shown on a television program in the United States. The first program to use captioning (visible through the Telecaption adapter sold by Sears for $249.95 for regular TV sets) was Disney's Wonderful World on NBC at 7:00 p.m., a showing of the 1963 film Son of Flubber. ABC debuted captioning with the ABC Sunday Night Movie (the 1978 film Force 10 from Navarone). The ABC and NBC networks initially offered five hours per week each of captioned programming, and the PBS network began with four (starting on March 18 with Masterpiece Theatre), with plans to increase to 10½ by July. The CBS network elected not to participate, arguing that the decoding equipment would soon become obsolete.
- Only seven days after taking office as the first woman Mayor of St. Albans, Vermont, Janet L. Smith was fatally wounded by a handyman who lived in the Smith house. Smith, the only female mayor in the state of Vermont, died the next day after several hours of surgery.
- Died: Neville D'Souza, 47, India soccer football team striker in the 1956 Olympic Games; from a brain hemorrhage.

== March 17, 1980 (Monday) ==
- In San Salvador, militant leftists barricaded themselves inside the National University of El Salvador as the Salvadoran Army closed in. According to the Salvadoran government, 53 people were killed in the first 24 hours of fighting.
- The United Kingdom House of Commons voted, 315 to 147, in favor of a nonbinding resolution urging the UK Olympic team to boycott the 1980 Summer Olympics in Moscow.
- One of the hostages escaped from the siege of the Dominican Republic's Embassy in Colombia by tying together bedsheets and climbing out a window. Uruguay's ambassador, Fernando Gomez, suffered only bruises from a fall after his bedsheet rope broke after he had climbed halfway down the building, and despite being shot at by the guerrillas.
- The CASA C-101 Aviojet, designed and built by Spain's aircraft manufacturer Construcciones Aeronáuticas SA (CASA), went into regular service for its primary customer, the Spanish Air Force.
- Died:
  - Boun Oum, 68, Prime Minister of Laos from 1948 to 1950 and 1960 to 1962
  - Rafael Paasio, 76, Prime Minister of Finland 1966-1968
  - John M. Slack Jr., 64, U.S. Representative for West Virginia since 1959, from a heart attack

== March 18, 1980 (Tuesday) ==
- Forty-five Soviet Army soldiers were killed at the Plesetsk Cosmodrome in Russia, when a Vostok-2M rocket exploded on its launch pad during a fueling operation. News of the disaster was suppressed, and would not be revealed worldwide until nearly 10 years later. Russian TV viewers would not be informed about the disaster until the year 2000.
- In the case of Rummel v. Estelle, the United States Supreme Court upheld the constitutionality of the most harsh habitual offender law in the United States, ruling, 5 to 4 that life imprisonment without parole was not "cruel and unusual punishment", even for minor theft. Under a law in the state of Texas, three felony convictions qualified for a mandatory life sentence. In three separate crimes over nine years, William James Rummel had obtained less than $230. On October 3, Rummel would obtain a new trial after a ruling that he had received ineffective assistance from his attorneys, and he would be released under a plea bargain reducing his sentence to time served.
- Born: Alexei Yagudin, Russian figure skater, World Championship and Olympic gold medalist; in Leningrad, Russian SFSR, Soviet Union
- Died:
  - Erich Fromm, 79, German psychiatrist and psychoanalyst
  - Louise Lovely (Nellie Carbasse), 85, Australian-born U.S. silent film actress and leading lady
  - Jessica Dragonette, 80, American opera singer who starred on the Philco Hour radio show from 1927 to 1930
  - Tamara de Lempicka, 81, Polish Art Deco painter
  - Frank Gotti, 12, the son of New York mobster John Gotti, was accidentally killed in Howard Beach, New York, after riding a minibike into the path of a car driven by a neighborhood resident, John Favara. Although Favara was cleared of responsibility by police investigators, he was kidnapped on July 28 and would never be seen again, apparently murdered by Gotti's Gambino crime family.

== March 19, 1980 (Wednesday) ==
- U.S. President Jimmy Carter invited Israel's Prime Minister Menahem Begin and Egypt's President Anwar Sadat to return to the White House in separate discussions on creating an autonomous Palestinian Arab homeland on the West Bank and Gaza. In the Camp David Accords signed in 1979, the two nations had agreed upon a deadline of May 26, 1980, to decide on a plan.
- Born: Johan Olsson, Swedish cross-country skier and Olympic gold medalist; in Skultuna

== March 20, 1980 (Thursday) ==
- The first "Tough Guy Contest", a mixed martial arts (MMA) competition organized by CV Productions, Inc. as the original government-sanctioned MMA tournament for men willing to pay a fee to fight for a cash prize, was held. The fights were held at a Holiday Inn in New Kensington, Pennsylvania over three days, and 42 contestants entered the first tournament.
- At 3:47 in the afternoon in the U.S. state of Washington, Mount St. Helens resumed volcanic activity after being dormant for 123 years. The first event was a minor 4.2 magnitude earth tremor below its north side, detected by an observatory in Newport, Washington. Located less than 12 miles from Cougar, Washington in Skamania County, the volcano vented steam on March 27 and steadily increased its activity, ending with a massive eruption on May 18 that would kill 57 people.
- All 26 people were killed in the crash of a twin-engine turboprop operated by China's national carrier, CAAC Airlines. The Antonov An-24RV crashed on landing in Changsha after departing from Guiyang.
- The first elections were held for the Parliament of the newly autonomous community of Catalonia in Spain. Catalonia, like the Basque Country and Galicia, was one of the three autonomous "nationality" communities among the 17 provided for in the 1978 constitutional reform.
- MV Mi Amigo, the ship housing pirate radio station Radio Caroline, sank off the English coast, after its anchor chain broke and it ran aground on a sandbank during a broadcast. The lifeboat Helen Turnbull rescued the crew of four before Mi Amigo went down in waters 16 feet (4.9 m) deep. From March 8, 1961, until the 1980 disaster, the ship had operated outside of British territorial waters to serve various pirate radio stations. Radio Caroline would return on August 19, 1983, on a new host ship, MV Ross Revenge.
- Born:
  - Mikey Day, American actor-comedian, Saturday Night Live cast member, in Anaheim, California
  - Jamal Crawford, American NBA point guard, in Seattle

== March 21, 1980 (Friday) ==
- The U.S. television show Dallas set up a mystery that would captivate TV audiences around the world with its final episode of the season, raising the question of "Who shot J.R.?". The episode itself, which set a precedent for cliffhanger endings for a TV season, was called "A House Divided". For the next eight months, viewers debated (and placed bets on) the answer to the mystery of who shot the star character of Dallas, J. R. Ewing (portrayed by Larry Hagman. On November 21, 1980, an estimated 83,000,000 viewers in the U.S. would watch the 1980–81 season premiere to learn the answer, the largest audience up to that time for an episode of a television series.
- Currency returned to the southeast Asian nation of Cambodia, five years after the former Communist Khmer Rouge government had created a "moneyless society" as part of its Democratic Kampuchea revolution and required all residents to give and receive rice in payment for goods and services. Heng Samrin, the Vietnamese-installed President of Cambodia announced that the Cambodian riel would be re-established as Cambodia's national currency on April 1, with a nominal exchange rate of four riels for a U.S. dollar.
- Angelo Bruno, the 69-year old organized crime boss of the South Philadelphia mob since 1959, was murdered while sitting in a car in front of his house at 934 Snyder Avenue. Bruno's bodyguard had driven Bruno home from Cous' Little Italy restaurant, and at 9:50 in the evening, a man stepped up to the passenger side window, placed a sawed-off shotgun behind Bruno's right ear and fired one shot. The mob hit began a 4-year long war between rival gangs that would claim 28 lives between 1980 and 1985, including Bruno's successor, Philip Testa, in 1981. The day before, Bruno had resumed answering questions before the New Jersey State Commission of Investigation.
- Born:
  - Marit Bjørgen, Norwegian cross-country skier, World Championship and Olympic gold medalist; in Trondheim
  - Ronaldinho (Ronaldo de Assis), Brazilian soccer football midfielder and national team member; in Porto Alegre
  - Deryck Whibley, Canadian-born American rock musician, frontman of Sum 41, in Scarborough, Ontario
- Died: Marcel Boussac, 91, French textile magnate and multimillionaire

== March 22, 1980 (Saturday) ==
- The Grand National Assembly of Turkey and the Turkish Senate met in joint session to vote for a successor to President Fahri Korutürk, whose 7-year term of office was set to expire on April 6. The session adjourned because nobody wanted to run for the office.
- U.S. President Carter met with his national advisers at Camp David and invited U.S. Air Force General David C. Jones, the Chairman of the Joint Chiefs of Staff to describe the Desert One rescue. General Jones explained that the commander of Delta Force, Special Forces Colonel Charlie Beckwith had devised a plan to land in Iran and rescue the U.S. Embassy hostages.
- Fighting broke out in N'Djamena, the capital of Chad, triggered a 10-day long battle between the Forces Armées du Nord (FAN) troops loyal to former Prime Minister Hissène Habré and the pro-Libya FROLINAT (Front de libération nationale) loyal to President Goukouni Oueddei. Over the next ten days, 3,000 people were killed and a new phase of the Chad Civil War began.
- The Georgia Guidestones were unveiled in Elbert County, Georgia, consisting of four granite slabs, engraved with "guides to mankind" written in 8 different languages.

== March 23, 1980 (Sunday) ==
- After nearly 10 months of leaking petroleum into the Gulf of Mexico, the Ixtoc I oil spill was finally capped by engineers of Petróleos Mexicanos (PEMEX), Mexico's government-operated oil company, who sealed the well by pouring gallons of cement into it, under pressure, to form three plugs. Two relief wells added to the main well had lowered the oil pressure enough by May 21 to begin the final three deposits to create cement plugs, starting at 4:00 in the afternoon. The first batch of 200 sacks of wet cement was pushed to a depth of 5,140 feet (1,570 m) below the sea floor and hardened into a 685 foot (209 m) plug. After a second plug was sent to a depth of 4,923 feet (1,501 m), the third and final plug was poured shortly before midnight to a depth of 4,431 feet (1,351 m) forming a mass 1,650 feet (500 m) long. The offshore well had been spilling oil since a blowout on June 3, 1979, and placed 3.3 million barrels (138,600,000 U.S. gallons or 524,650,000 liters) of oil, the largest amount in history up to that time.
- The Totonero scandal, a match-fixing scheme implicating 27 players in Italy's top two levels of professional soccer football (Serie A and Serie B), was revealed partway through the season after two investors filed a complaint with the national prosecutor. Eleven players of defending Italian Serie A champion, A.C. Milan were arrested in their locker room after their 1–0 win over visiting Torino, along with the club president, Felice Colombo. Four players for S.S. Lazio were arrested at the end of the matches played that day. Eight of the 16 Serie A clubs were implicated, and although the accused players were acquitted, five of the Serie A teams were penalized at the end of the 1979–1980 season. Notably, A.C. Milan (which had won the 1978–79 championship and had finished in third place in the standings with 14 wins and 8 losses) were relegated to the second-division Serie B, a fate normally reserved for the three teams with the worst records. Lazio, finishing 13th out of the 16 teams, were demoted as well.
- Voters in Sweden chose the slowest of three options for the phasing out of nuclear power in a non-binding referendum that attracted more than 75% of the eligible electorate.
- With only two nations in the world ready to bring him within their borders, the former Shah of Iran ended 100 days of exile on Panama's Contadora Island and flew with his family to Egypt in order to receive surgery. The Shah departed Panama City on a chartered DC-8 jetliner operated by Evergreen International Airlines, a contractor for the American CIA. Since leaving Iran on January 16, 1979, the Shah had lived in Morocco, the Bahamas, Mexico, the United States and, since December 15, in Panama. The Shah's arrival in New York City on October 22 had triggered the Iran Hostage Crisis.
- Single candidate elections were held in Poland for approval of the 460 seats in the Sejm, Poland's parliament, but for the first time, secret balloting was allowed. "A surprisingly high proportion" of voters chose the option of going into curtained booths in order to strike out the names of candidates they didn't want, although, as a UPI report noted, "The orthodox thing to do was to drop the slips without any changes into a ballot box." The Polish United Workers' Party (PUWP), the nation's Communist Party led by First Secretary Edward Gierek, had allotted itself 261 seats, while approving the candidates for other 169 seats for the United People's Party (ZSL) and the Democratic Alliance (SD).
- The Old Dominion University Lady Monarchs defeated the University of Tennessee Lady Volunteers, 68 to 53, to win the women's college basketball championship, sponsored since 1972 by the Association for Intercollegiate Athletics for Women (AIAW).
- Born: Russell Howard, English comedian, TV host and actor; in Bristol

== March 24, 1980 (Monday) ==
- Óscar Romero, the Roman Catholic Archbishop of San Salvador, was assassinated by a gunman while celebrating evening Mass at the chapel of the Divine Provincence Hospital in El Salvador's capital. When Romero elevated the chalice of wine for the Consecration, a .22 caliber bullet was fired into his chest by the assassin. Although nobody would ever be convicted of the crime, a United Nations Commission concluded that the killing was ordered by Roberto D'Aubuisson, the leader of the right-wing Nationalist Republican Alliance (ARENA). Romero would be canonized as a Roman Catholic saint on October 14, 2018.
- In the U.S., the ABC news program Nightline, hosted by Ted Koppel, premiered at 11:30 at night. Nightline was a continuation of America Held Hostage, Koppel's nightly special reports about the Iran hostage crisis that had started on November 8.
- The University of Louisville Cardinals won the NCAA college basketball championship, defeating the UCLA Bruins, 59 to 54.
- Died:
  - Pierre Etchebaster, 86, French courte-paume tennis champion
  - John Barrie, 62, English TV and film actor

== March 25, 1980 (Tuesday) ==
- Delegates of the British Olympic Association voted to send a team to the 1980 Summer Olympics in Moscow, declining to joining the boycott of the games.
- U.S. Senator Teddy Kennedy won his first challenge against President Carter for the Democratic Party nomination, winning the primary elections in New York and Connecticut.
- The unmanned Soviet transport spacecraft Soyuz T-1 returned to Earth, two days after being undocked by remote control from the Salyut 6 space station. T-1 had docked successfully with the station on December 19.
- Died:
  - Erminio Macario, 77, Italian comedian and film actor
  - Walter Susskind, 66, Czech-born British conductor
  - James Wright, 52, Pulitzer Prize-winning American poet
  - Milton H. Erickson, 78, American psychiatrist specializing in medical hypnosis

== March 26, 1980 (Wednesday) ==
- An attempt by the three Hunt brothers to own most of the world's silver failed after Texas billionaire Nelson Bunker Hunt announced in Paris that he and four investors planned to issue bonds for sale, backed by their combined holdings of 200 million ounces of silver. Hunt's partners in the venture were introduced as Prince Faysal Ben Abdallah al-Saud, Sheik Mohammed al Amoudi and Mahmoud Fustok of Saudi Arabia, and Naji Nahas of Brazil. The next day, the price of silver (which had reached a record of $53 per ounce in January before sliding to $17.50) dropped steeply when the London Commodities Exchange opened, and fell to $10.50 at the New York Comex.
- Born: Sammy Flex (stage name for Samuel Atuobi Baah), Ghanaian journalist, newspaper editor and TV show host.
- Died: Roland Barthes, 64, French semiotics pioneer

== March 27, 1980 (Thursday) ==
- A landslide buried the village of Ayvazhacı in Turkey's Kayseri Province, killing at least 64 people.
- The 3.05 mi (4.91 km) Eikefet Tunnel, at the time the longest road tunnel in Norway, was opened to motorists on Norway's highway E39. Rated as one of the most unsafe tunnels in Europe, the route was bored through Mount Kjellrusen between the villages of Eikefet and Odnåstjørni.
- Thirty-one miners were killed in the plunge of an elevator, more than a mile down a shaft at South Africa's Vaal Reefs gold mine. The group— 28 black and three white miners— had boarded a double decker elevator cage and were being lowered when one of the supporting cables broke. The elevator plunged roughly 6,200 feet — 1.2 miles (1.9 km) — killing everyone on board, and the 12-foot (3.7 m) high cage was compressed to a height of less than 12 inches (300 mm) on impact. While the death toll was originally reported as 23, 31 bodies were identified from the wreckage.
- The first (and only) Aston Martin Bulldog, intended to be one of the fastest production cars ever, was introduced to the public at the English village of Aston Clinton in Buckinghamshire. Although the Aston Martin company planned to build 25 of the vehicles, the company would shelve the project in 1981. The company claimed that the car was capable of a speed of 237 miles per hour (381 km/h). In time trials in 1979, it had been timed at 192 miles per hour (309 km/h).
- The Alexander L. Kielland, an accommodation platform built offshore as living quarters for oil company employees working on the Edda 2/7C oil rig, collapsed during a storm in the North Sea, killing 123 of the 212 people there. At 6:30 in the evening local time, the rig tilted 30° as five of the six anchor cables on one of its supports, trapping many of the workmen in their rooms, in a dining hall and in a theater where some were watching a film. Over the next 23 minutes, the rig continued to tilt until the final cable snapped. The disaster would be traced to metal fatigue in one of the six bracings and a crack that had started from "a 14-inch hole drilled in the brace to accommodate a hydrophone."
- The Silver Thursday market crash occurred in the United States commodity markets after brothers Nelson Bunker Hunt, William Herbert Hunt, and Lamar Hunt attempted to corner the silver market, after months of buying and selling using futures to pay a particular price for silver on a future date. The day before, the Tiffany's jewelry store chain took out a full-page ad in The New York Times, condemning the Hunt Brothers and stating, "We think it is unconscionable for anyone to hoard several billion, yes billion, dollars' worth of silver and thus drive the price up so high that others must pay artificially high prices for articles made of silver."

== March 28, 1980 (Friday) ==
- The Talpiot Tomb, claimed in a 2007 documentary to be "The Lost Tomb of Jesus", was discovered by construction workers who were excavating a site to build an apartment complex in East Jerusalem. Identified by archaeologists as a Jewish family tomb that existed during the time of the Second Temple (between 516 BC and 70 AD), the tomb had six ossuary caskets, including one that appeared to be inscribed with the name "Yeshua bar Yehosef", a reference to "Jesus, son of Joseph".
- A stolen Havana transit bus crashed through the gates of the Peruvian Embassy in Cuba, carrying a group of Cubans anxious to flee the country and starting the events that would lead to the Mariel Boatlift. By April 1, there were 24 asylum-seekers on the embassy grounds after a second bus crashed the embassy and a Cuban guard was killed. After the Cuban government withdrew its protection on April 4, over 10,000 Cuban citizens occupied the embassy's grounds and the Cuban government announced that it would grant diplomatic protection to the occupiers and would allow them to peacefully emigrate.
- Mohammad Reza Pahlavi, the deposed Shah of Iran, received cancer surgery in Egypt, delayed for several months after he was ordered to leave the United States and a week after Houston surgeon Dr. Michael DeBakey had concluded that facilities in Panama were inadequate. Upon removing the Shah's cancerous spleen, surgeons found that the cancer had spread to his liver. The Shah died four months later, on July 27.
- The Jetstream 31, a turboprop airliner built by the nationalized British Aerospace company's subsidiary, Scottish Aviation, made its first flight.
- "Strawberry Shortcake", a cartoon character originally invented in 1973 by the American Greetings card company and the Kenner toy company to sell merchandise, was introduced to young girls with "The World of Strawberry Shortcake", a 30-minute syndicated program, seen on 90 U.S. television stations. The cartoon was popular enough that five sequels, each telecast in the spring, were produced, followed by a television series.
- Died:
  - Dick Haymes, 61, Argentine-born American actor and singer
  - Helena Bochořáková-Dittrichová, 85, Czech illustrator and graphic novelist

== March 29, 1980 (Saturday) ==
- Iraq and Iran fought their first border skirmish, ultimately leading to the eight-year long Iran-Iraq War. Iraq's state-operated Radio Baghdad gave no details but said that Iranian aggression took place at an Iraqi border post and that, after encountering resistance, the Iranians "fled with their tails between their legs."
- Pars News Agency, the state-controlled Iranian press organization, alleged that U.S. President Carter had offered to apologize to Iran in return for the release of the U.S. Embassy hostages, and released the text of what it said was a "text of a conciliatory message" sent on March 26 from President Carter to the Ayatollah Khomeini, and read a text over state radio at 9:00 in the evening local time. According to the text, Carter said that "a very sensitive international situation... made us all make mistakes in the past" and that "The great advantage of American democracy is that it always could recognize its mistakes or condemn them." White House Press Secretary Jody Powell told reporters, "The president has sent no message to Khomeini. Period."
- Born: Prince Hamzah bin Hussein, Crown Prince of Jordan from 1999 to 2004 until his status was rescinded by his older half-brother King Abdullah II; in Amman
- Died:
  - Annunzio Paolo Mantovani, 74, Italian-born British classical composer and recording artist known simply as "Mantovani"
  - Vicente López Carril, 37, Italian cyclist who won various stages of several Grand Tours (including three stages of the Tour de France); from a heart attack suspected to be a consequence of performance-enhancing drug use

== March 30, 1980 (Sunday) ==
- The Tony Award winning play Children of a Lesser God, the first major theatrical production to feature a deaf actor in the leading role, began a successful run on Broadway. Critics' reactions were mixed. Walter Kerr of the New York Times called the play "the season's unexpected find" while Douglas Watt of New York's Daily News said of author Mark Medoff's approach to the problems of the deaf, "His concern and understanding are clear, but he hasn't bothered to present their story in any but the most elementary dramatic terms. Instead, he has relied on our obvious sympathies and the novelty of his subject to carry the evening..."
- Delegates of the Canadian Olympic Committee voted to send a team to the 1980 Summer Olympics in Moscow, declining to joining the boycott of the games.

Syrian flag (1980–2024)

- Syria changed its flag for the fifth time in 34 years since becoming independent in 1946, after changes made in 1958, 1961, 1963 and 1972. The sixth flag, which was a return to the flag it had adopted in 1958, had remained the state's banner for 44 years until the collapse of the Ba'athist Syria in 2024.
- For the first time, West Germany and East Germany simultaneously set their clocks ahead one hour in the spring to observe for Central European Summer Time (similar to the advancement of clocks in North America for daylight saving time). West Germany's government had voted in 1978 to reintroduce summer time, but had waited until an agreement could be reached with East Germany on simultaneous implementation.

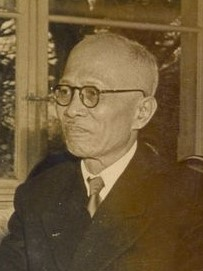
Ton Duc Thang

- Died:
  - Ton Duc Thang, 91, the oldest president in the world. He had succeeded Ho Chi Minh as President of North Vietnam in 1969, and unified Vietnam from 1976 onward. Ton was succeeded by Vice President Nguyen Huu Tho, who had administered South Vietnam after the conquest of that nation to by North Vietnam in 1975.
  - David Sharpe, 70, American film actor and stuntman

== March 31, 1980 (Monday) ==
- U.S. President Carter signed the Depository Institutions Deregulation and Monetary Control Act into law, giving the Federal Reserve System authority to set rules for all banks, whether members or not; raising the deposit insurance on banks from $40,000 to $100,000; allowing institutions to compete on loan interest rates; deregulating savings and loan associations; and allowing, effective January 1, nationwide use of the NOW Account, an account that could pay interest on deposits but would still allow unlimited withdrawal of the deposits through the use of a Negotiable Order of Withdrawal.
- World Boxing Association heavyweight champion John Tate, previously unbeaten with 20 wins, 11 by knockout, was himself knocked out by Mike Weaver with 45 seconds left in a 15-round bout in Knoxville, Tennessee. On the same evening in Las Vegas, World Boxing Council heavyweight champion Larry Holmes, unbeaten (33-0), defended his title with his sixth consecutive knockout, delivering a TKO to Leroy Jones in the 8th round.
- The bankrupt Chicago, Rock Island and Pacific Railroad, commonly called "The Rock Island", operated its final train, bearing freight that was unloaded at Denver. Its assets, including tracks, cars and equipment, and land, were liquidated by being sold to other railroad companies, raising more than $500,000,000 to pay off creditors at full value along with interest.
- The Aerospace Defense Command (ADCOM) of the U.S. Air Force was permanently deactivated, after its functions and equipment had been transferred to four other USAF commands.
- Born:
  - Kate Micucci, American comedian, actress and songwriter; in Jersey City, New Jersey
  - Maaya Sakamoto, Japanese actress, in Tokyo
- Died:
  - Jesse Owens, 66, African-American track and field athlete and Olympic gold medalist
  - Vladimír Holan, 74, Czech poet
