= February 1980 =

Month of 1980

<<	February 1980					>>
Su	Mo	Tu	We	Th	Fr	Sa
					1	2
3	4	5	6	7	8	9
10	11	12	13	14	15	16
17	18	19	20	21	22	23
24	25	26	27	28	29

February 18, 1980: Canada's Liberal Party wins elections, replaces Progressive Conservative government

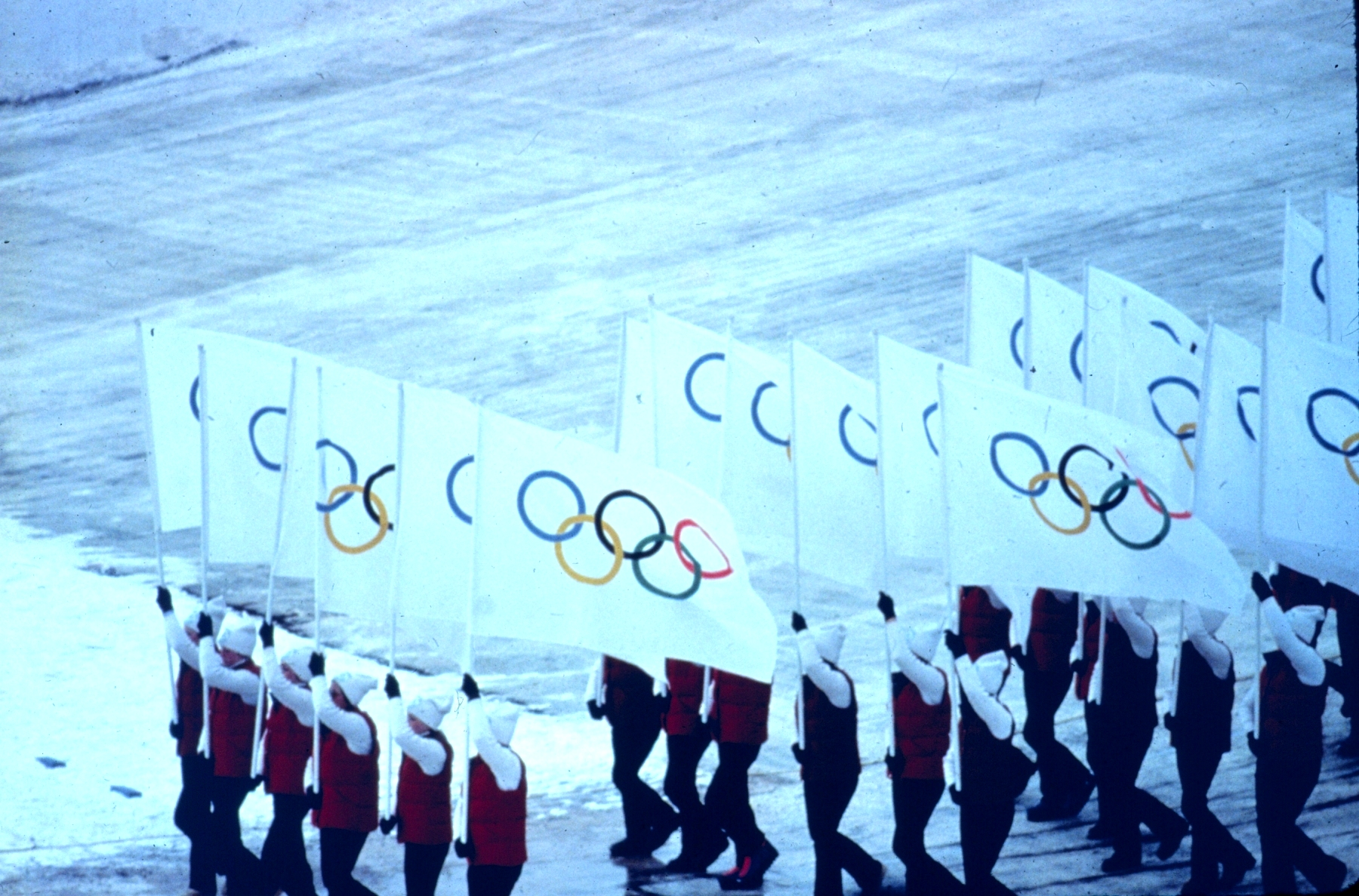
February 13, 1980: Winter Olympic games open in the U.S. at Lake Placid, New York

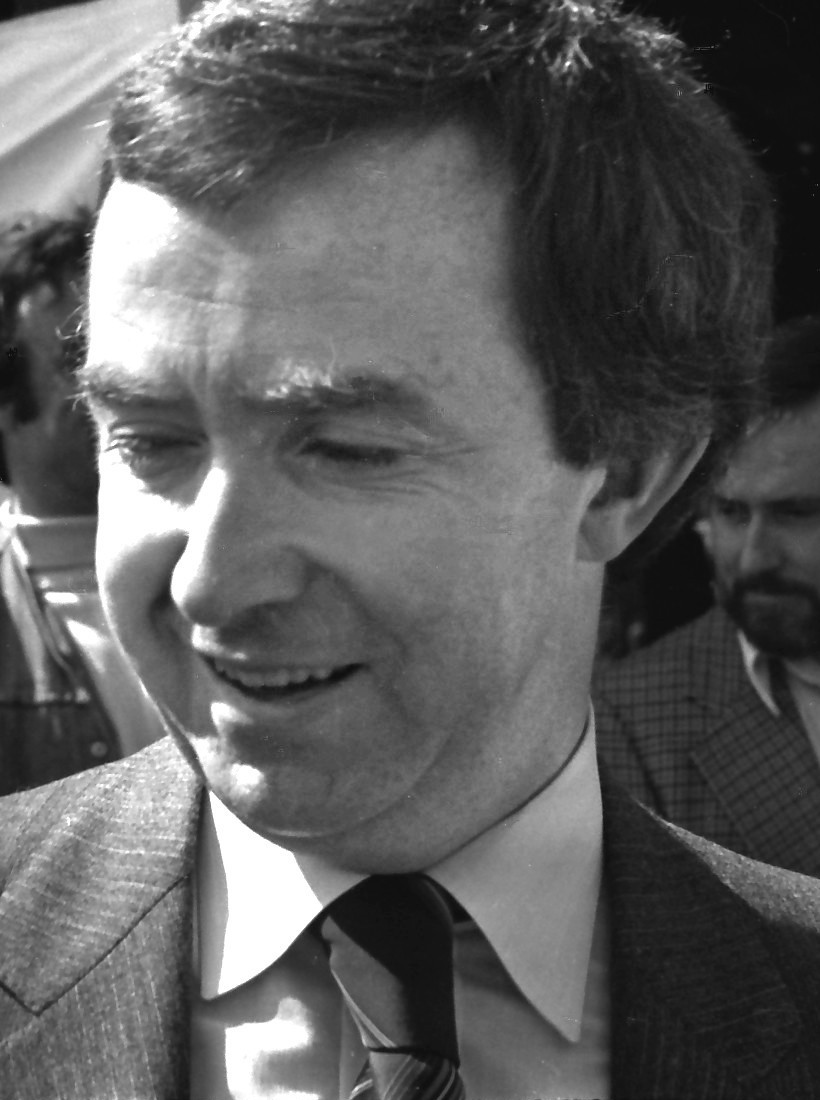
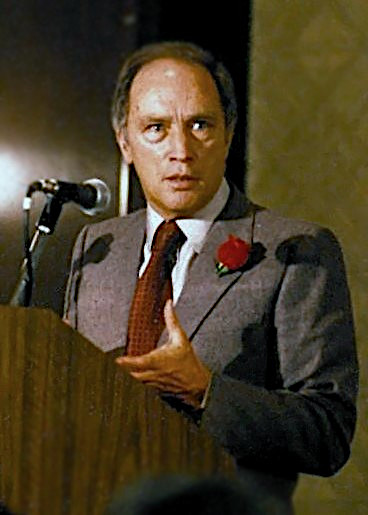
Outgoing Canadian PM Joe Clark, returning PM Pierre Trudeau

The following events happened in February 1980:

== February 1, 1980 (Friday) ==
- The U.S. Department of Energy released its emergency plans for gasoline rationing in the event of a fuel shortage during the summer. Features of the plan, which never needed to be implemented, included a four-day workweek, requirements that car drivers choose three days per week not to drive, limiting gasoline purchases to $7.00, and allowing gasoline to be bought only on odd or even numbered days of the month.
- The U.S. television soap opera Love of Life broadcast its 7,316th and last episode after a run of more than 28 years that had started on September 24, 1951. Larry Auerbach, who had directed every one of the episodes, commented that "It hasn't really died a natural death. It was murdered." The show's declining ratings had become worse after it was moved from 11:30 to 4:00 in the afternoon, after which it was dropped by 40 CBS affiliates in favor of local programming and reruns.
- The film "erotic historical drama" Caligula, which had premiered in Italy in 1979, was released in the United States by its co-producer, Penthouse magazine publisher Bob Guccione. The unrated and pornographic film, about the decadent reign of Gaius Caesar Germanicus (Emperor of Rome from 37 to 41 AD) had a cast of distinguished actors, including Malcolm McDowell in the title role, Sir John Gielgud as Marcus Cocceius Nerva, Peter O'Toole as the Emperor Tiberius Caesar and Helen Mirren as Caligula's wife Milonia Caesonia. New York Daily News film critic Kathleen Carroll wrote that "'Caligula,' like its leading character, is doomed from the very start," and added "[T]wo hours of 'Caligula'... is two hours more than anyone should have to endure."
- Died: Jack Bailey, 72, American game show host known for the TV series Queen for a Day

== February 2, 1980 (Saturday) ==
- The New Mexico State Penitentiary riot began at 1:40 in the morning in Santa Fe. After 36 hours, the New Mexico National Guard and a police SWAT team were able to bring an end to the inmate takeover of the New Mexico State Penitentiary, but not before 33 inmates had been killed and more than 100 injured. Many of the deaths were inmates who were discovered, after prisoners had broken into the warden's office, to have secretly been informants. An "execution squad" used blowtorches and axes to torture and then kill inmates deemed to have betrayed others.
- Born:
  - Zhang Jingchu, Chinese film actress and China Film Media Award winner for Best Actress in 2005; in Yong'an, Fujian province
  - Nina Zilli (stage name for Maria Chiara Fraschetta), Italian singer, in Piacenza
- Died:
  - William H. Stein, 63, American biochemist and co-winner of the 1972 Nobel Prize in Chemistry for his work with Stanford Moore in perfecting the analysis of amino acids and protein sequences.
  - Joseph Fontanet, 59, French politician and former Minister of National Education, died one day after he was shot by unknown assailants outside of his apartment in Paris.
  - Carmelo Larrea, 72, Spanish songwriter and musician.

== February 3, 1980 (Sunday) ==
- "Operation Abscam" the FBI's sting operation against members of the United States Congress suspected of bribery, was revealed by the Bureau. Over a period of 14 months in 1978 and 1979, agents posing as Arab sheiks contacted and offered bribes to 20 public officials and 10 private individuals who were secretly being filmed. The code name "Abscam" was derived from "Arab Scam". U.S. Senator Harrison A. Williams and U.S. Representatives Frank Thompson, both of New Jersey, would be convicted later bribery, along with U.S. Representatives John Jenrette of South Carolina, Raymond Lederer and Michael "Ozzie" Myers of Pennsylvania, John M. Murphy of New York, and Richard Kelly of Florida. All of the members of Congress except for Kelly were Democrats.
- Died: Ray Heindorf, 71, American film score composer who won three Academy Awards

== February 4, 1980 (Monday) ==
- An unidentified patient at Johns Hopkins University Hospital became the first human being to be implanted with an implantable cardioverter-defibrillator (ICD), developed by a team of physicians headed by an Israeli cardiologist, Dr. Michel Mirowski. The device was implanted by Dr. Levi Watkins. In the years since, millions of patients would have their lives prolonged by the Mirowski ICD.
- Abolhassan Banisadr was sworn in as the first president of Iran at a hospital room in Tehran. The Islamic Republic's de facto leader, the Ayatollah Ruhollah Khomeini, administered the oath from his hospital bed in a nationally televised ceremony, then endorsed Banisadr, who had been elected to a four-year term. The TV broadcast was poorly handled by the television crew, and the chairman of Iran's state radio and television council resigned the next day. According to a Reuters account of the telecast, "Parts of it were virtually inaudible and the camera was frequently jolted and out of focus."
- Rioters in Tripoli, Libya broke into the French Embassy and destroyed much of the first floor and set fire to cars in the embassy courtyard. Embassy personnel were able to escape unharmed. The attack arose from a demonstration against France for its aid in helping Tunisia repel a Libyan attack on Gafsa. On December 2, a mob of about 2,000 people had set fire to the first and second floors of the U.S. Embassy in Tripoli.

== February 5, 1980 (Tuesday) ==
- As the Iran Hostage Crisis started its 94th day, the American captives at the U.S. Embassy were woken up by guards wearing black ski masks, blindfolded and led to other rooms, where they were told to disrobe, put up their hands, and kneel down. Blindfolded, the hostages could hear weapons being readied to fire and a commander ordering the guards to take aim, an experience that was the most terrifying of their captivity. One of the hostages would later tell an author, "It was an embarrassing moment. However, we were too scared to realize it." A moment later, the prisoners were told to get dressed again, and were told that the mock execution was a practical joke that their student captors had wanted to try.

== February 6, 1980 (Wednesday) ==
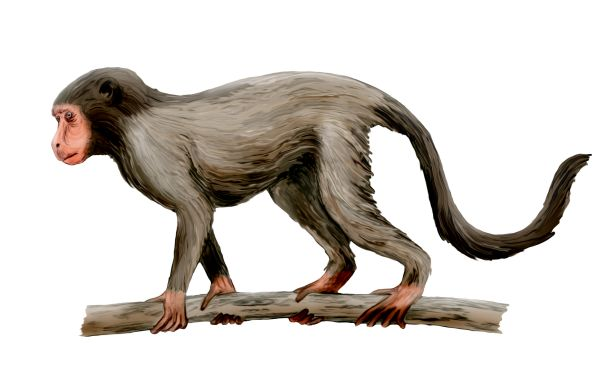
artist's rendition of Aegyptopithecus zeuxis

- Scientists announced the discovery of the earliest-known primate ancestor of human beings, with remains of Aegyptopithecus, described by The New York Times as "the oldest ape-human evolutionary link found so far" and dated to 30 million years ago. Elwyn Simons, who had discovered more than 20 skeletal fossils in the Sahara Desert in Egypt since 1966, said that the species, later classified as Aegyptopithecus zeuxis had been about the size of a cat. The fossils had been found inside a geological formation called the Jebel Qatrani Formation, outside of Faiyum.
- Mathieu Kérékou was re-elected, unopposed, as the President of Benin.
- The trial of serial killer John Wayne Gacy began in Chicago before a jury from Rockford, Illinois. Gacy, suspected of the murder of 27 victims between 1972 and 1978, would be executed in the electric chair on May 9, 1994.

== February 7, 1980 (Thursday) ==
- The "hotline" between Seoul and Pyongyang reopened at 10:00 in the morning, the day after reunification talks between South Korea and North Korea at Panmunjom, in a meeting room of the Neutral Nations Supervisory Commission to discuss a meeting between the two nations' prime ministers. The direct telephone communications link had been disconnected since 1976.

== February 8, 1980 (Friday) ==
- Gunnar Thoroddsen deserted his political party, the Sjálfstæðisflokkurinn (Independence Party) to form a coalition government to replace Benedikt Gröndal and to become the oldest Prime Minister of Iceland in the north Atlantic nation's history. Thoroddsen, the former mayor of Reykjavik and a losing candidate in the 1968 presidential election, allied with the Framsóknarflokkurinn (FSF or Progressive Party) and the Alþýðubandalagið (People's Alliance) to control 31 of the 60 seats in the Althing, Iceland's parliament.
- Less than one week after the FBI revealed its Abscam sting operation against Congress members, the Bureau announced the results of a second operation, Brilab, against state government officials suspected of taking money from organized crime. The code name "Brilab" was coined from the words "bribery" and "labor". Teams of FBI investigators were sent to Texas and Louisiana after the existence of Brilab had been leaked to the public.
- Born:
  - Yang Wei, Chinese gymnast and 2008 Olympic gold medalist in all-around competition; in Xiantao, Hubei province
  - William Jackson Harper, American TV actor, in Dallas
- Died: Nikos Xilouris, 43, Cretan Greek composer and folk singer, from lung cancer

== February 9, 1980 (Saturday) ==
- Almost two weeks before their "Miracle on Ice" meeting, the United States Olympic ice hockey team was overwhelmed by the Soviet team in an exhibition at New York City's Madison Square Garden. The Americans lost, 10 to 3.
- Born:
  - Manu Raju, American TV journalist, in Downers Grove, Illinois
- Died: Rostislav Alexeyev, 63, Soviet Russian military designer and pioneer of the ground-effect vehicle (GEV) aircraft and hydrofoil ships

== February 10, 1980 (Sunday) ==
- The Partido dos Trabalhadores (PT) political party was founded in São Paulo. In 2002, it would capture the presidency with the election of Luiz Inácio Lula da Silva.
- An eight-year-old boy on a camping trip in the U.S. state of Washington, Brian Ingram, found roughly $3,000 of the $200,000 ransom that had been paid as a ransom to hijacker D. B. Cooper on November 24, 1971. A man, who had bought a ticket under the fictitious name of Dan Cooper, had hijacked Northwest Orient Airlines Flight 305. He parachuted from the Boeing 727 somewhere over Oregon after being paid cash. No other trace of "Cooper", nor his actual identity, would ever be found. Brian was allowed to keep about half of the cash and would sell some of it at a 2008 auction for $37,000.
- Died: Dr. Louis W. Sauer, 94, American pediatrician who, in 1931, developed the first practical vaccine for whooping cough and helped create the DPT vaccine.

== February 11, 1980 (Monday) ==
- Three former Nazi Gestapo officers were sentenced to jail terms after being convicted of assisting in the mass murder of 70,000 Jews in France during World War II. All three had overseen the arrest and deportation of Jewish residents in Vichy France. All three had lived freely in West Germany after the war, beyond the reach of prosecution until the statute of limitations for war crimes had been extended. Herbert Hagen, nicknamed "The Butcher of Paris" by his accusers, was a business executive after having been the Gestapo's chief on France's west coast from 1940 to 1942 and received a 12-year sentence. Kurt Lischka, the former Gestapo commandant of Paris, was convicted of war crimes and sentenced to 10 years. His deputy chief, Ernst Heinrichsohn, mayor of the town of Bürgstadt at the time of the trial, got six years.
- Died: Yakov Malik, 73, Soviet Russian diplomat and the USSR's Representative to the United Nations from 1948 to 1952 and 1968 to 1976. Because he was absent during the UN Security Council's vote on its Resolution 82 on June 25, 1950, the Soviet Union was unable to veto the sending of United Nations troops to the Korean War

== February 12, 1980 (Tuesday) ==
- The Saudi American Bank (SAmBa) was founded after Citibank was forced to sell its branches in Jeddah and Riyadh in accordance with a Saudi requirement that forced all foreign banks to be at least 60% owned by Saudi nationals.
- Born:
  - Juan Carlos Ferrero, Spanish professional tennis player, 2003 French Open winner who was ranked #1 in the world by the ATP for two months in 2003; in Ontinyent
  - Christina Ricci, American film and TV actress; in Santa Monica, California
  - Gucci Mane (stage name for Radric Davis), American hip hop music artist known as a pioneer in trap music; in Bessemer, Alabama

== February 13, 1980 (Wednesday) ==
- Opening ceremonies for the 1980 Winter Olympics were held in Lake Placid, New York, even as western nations were waiting for a deadline to pass on a boycott of the 1980 Summer Olympics in Moscow.

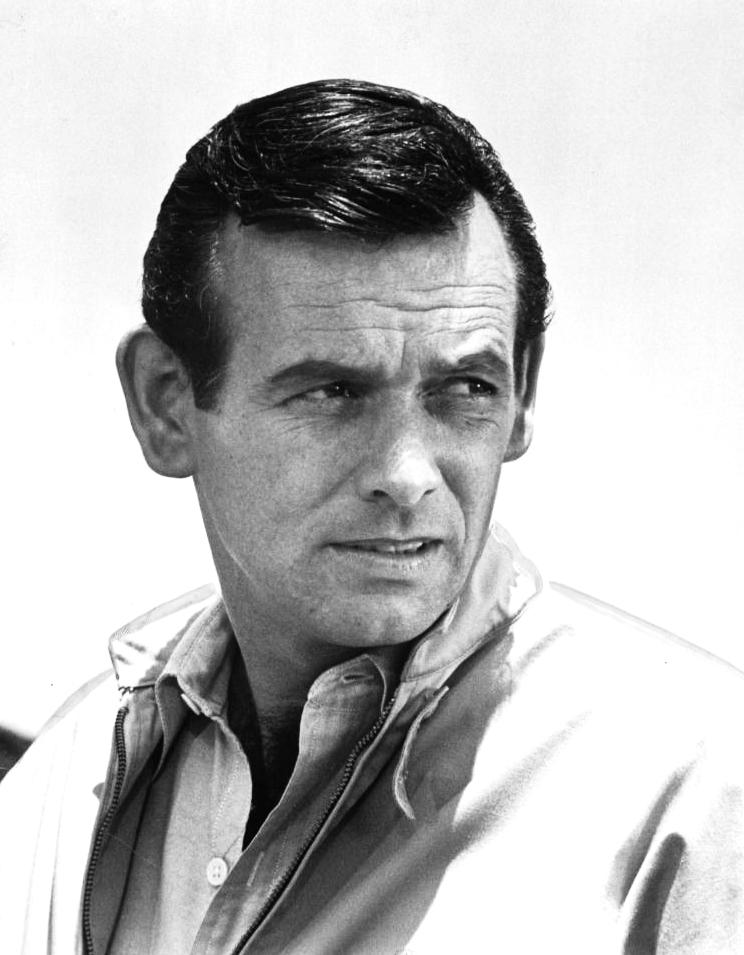
Janssen

- Died: David Janssen (stage name for David Harold Meyer), 48, American television and film actor best known for his portrayal of Dr. Richard Kimble in The Fugitive; from a heart attack

== February 14, 1980 (Thursday) ==
- Dr. Algirdas Statkevičius, a Soviet dissident member of the Lithuanian Helsinki Group, was arrested in Vilnius and would be sentenced on 11 August 1980 to forcible psychiatric treatment, reportedly for "anti-Soviet activities". Dr. Statkevičius was transferred to the Chernyakhovsk Special Hospital, near Vilnius, for confinement.

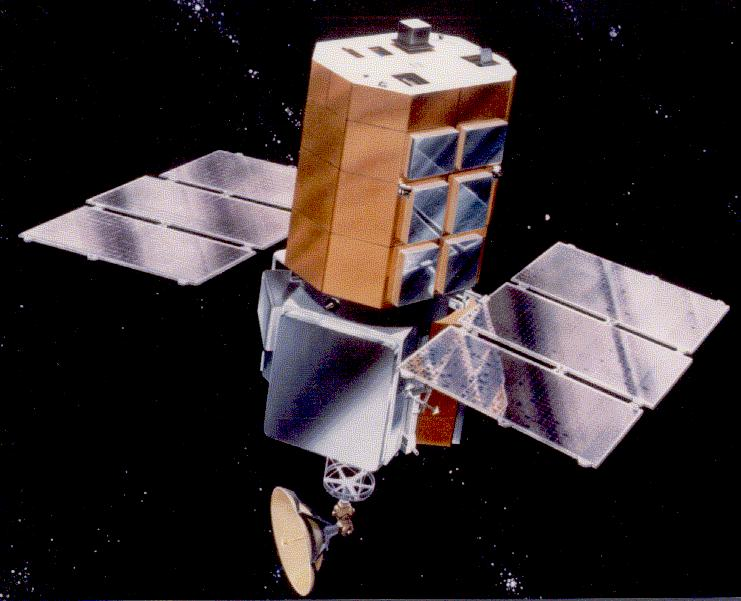
Artist's rendition of the Solar Max satellite

- The Solar Max (Solar Maximum Mission) satellite, designed by the U.S. to investigate solar flares and other solar phenomena, was launched at 10:57 in the morning from Cape Canaveral. It would fail nine months after its launch until its repair by a space shuttle crew in 1984, and would continue experiments until re-entering the Earth atmosphere on December 2, 1989.
- The CBS television network announced that anchorman Walter Cronkite would retire in 1981, prior to his mandatory retirement on his 65th birthday. The CBS Network announced that Dan Rather would succeed Cronkite, the anchor since the program started in 1963, rather than the other candidate for Cronkite's successor, Roger Mudd. Cronkite's last broadcast of the CBS Evening News would be on March 6, 1981.
- Died:
  - Ricky Knotts, 28, American racing driver; in race crash at Daytona International Speedway
  - Michael Zaffarano, American organized crime boss for the Bonanno crime family, died of a heart attack after being surprised by a raid on his headquarters by the FBI.

== February 15, 1980 (Friday) ==
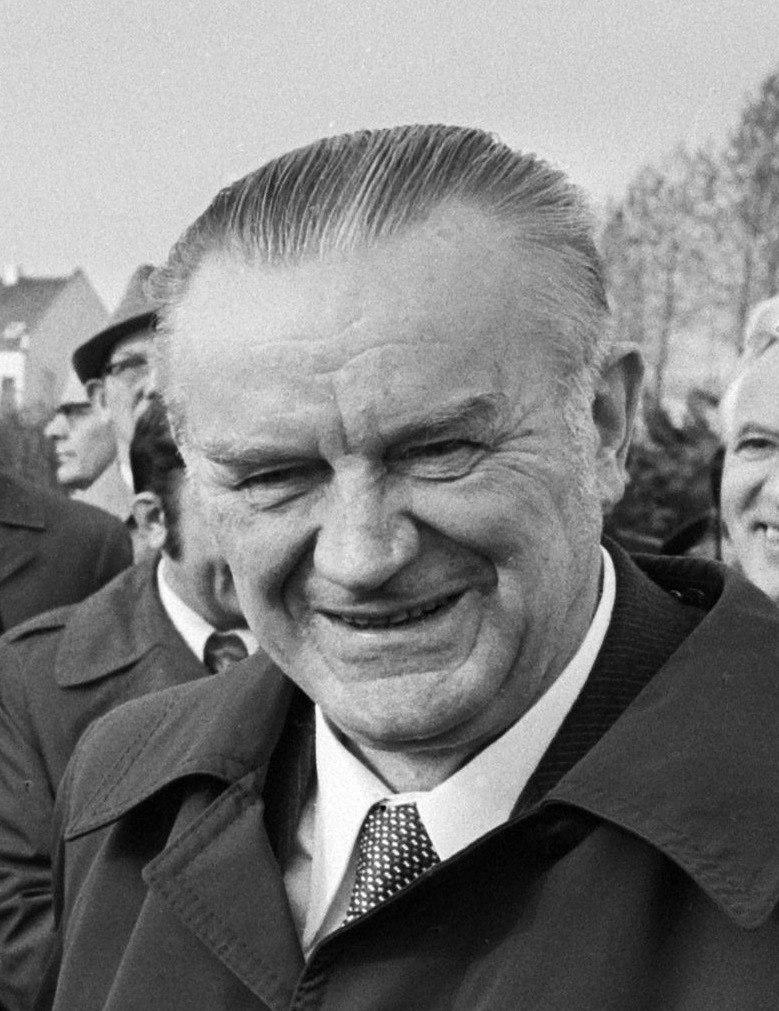
Jaroszewicz

- The Polish United Workers' Party dismissed Prime Minister Piotr Jaroszewicz from office and replaced him with Edward Babiuch. Edward Gierek, the general secretary of the PUWP, Poland's governing Communist Party, told the 1,800 delegates at the close of the five-day Party Congress that Jaroszewicz had "asked to be relieved" of his posts in the government and in the Party, along with Foreign Minister Stefan Olszowski, both of whom were blamed for Poland's worsening economy. The day before Jaroszewicz's departure, a PUWP official told the Congress that the officials responsible for Poland's failure to achieve production targets would have to leave.
- In Vanuatu, called at that time the New Hebrides, followers of John Frum's cargo cult on the island of Tanna seceded as the nation of Tafea.
- Born: Conor Oberst, American folk singer and songwriter, in Omaha, Nebraska

== February 16, 1980 (Saturday) ==
- The longest traffic jam in history took place in France, backing up vehicles for 109 miles (175 km) on the A6 autoroute, the multi-lane highway between Lyon and Paris. Thousands of vacationing skiers were returning from the French Alps, traveling north along A6, along with normal Saturday traffic. Starting with the 1981 edition of the Guinness Book of World Records, the incident was reported under the category of "Longest Traffic Jam".
- A total solar eclipse was seen in central Africa and south Asia, with totality lasting 4 minutes and eight seconds and peaking at 0853 UTC, 11:53 in the morning over Somalia. Half of the world's population at the time, two billion people, were in the shadow of the Moon.

== February 17, 1980 (Sunday) ==
- In India, President Neelam Sanjiva Reddy placed nine of India's then 21 states under President's rule until new elections for the state legislatures could be held in those states. The action came one month after Indira Gandhi and the Indian National Congress Party (INC) had resumed control of the national government. The nine states — Bihar, Gujarat, Maharashtra, Madhya Pradesh, Orissa Punjab, Rajasthan, Tamil Nadu, and Uttar Pradesh — were those whose governments were ruled by opposition parties. Mrs. Gandhi said that the dissolved opposition governments "no longer reflected the will of the people."
- A secret meeting took place in Paris between U.S. presidential adviser Hamilton Jordan and Iranian Foreign Minister Sadegh Ghotbzadeh to discuss a resolution to the Iran hostage crisis. An impasse was reached when Ghotbzadeh suggested that the U.S. covertly arrange the assassination of the former Shah of Iran as one of the pre-requisites for a release of the 49 hostages.
- United Nations Secretary General Kurt Waldheim announced the creation of a UN investigative commission to negotiate with Iran for the release of the American hostages.
- The fastest Daytona 500 up to that time took place in Daytona Beach, Florida as Buddy Baker crossed the finish line 13 seconds ahead of Bobby Allison. Baker, who had never been able to win NASCAR's opening event despite qualifying for its first 21 runnings since 1959, averaged 193 miles per hour (311 km/h) in the final 18 laps after getting only one can of fuel on his final pit stop, which was completed in six seconds. After winning on an almost empty fuel tank, Allison had to get a refill in order to take the ceremonial victory lap.
- The first winter ascent of Mount Everest was accomplished by the team of Krzysztof Wielicki and Leszek Cichy of Poland.
- Air New Zealand made the final flight of its sightseeing service of Antarctica, its popular Flight 901 series from Auckland over the Mount Erebus volcano on Ross Island in the Ross Dependency and back. The service during the Antarctic summer had started three years earlier in February 1977 but was phased out after all 257 people on board a DC-10 were killed in the Mount Erebus disaster on November 28, 1979.
- Born: Jason Ritter, American TV and film actor, in Los Angeles
- Died: Jerry Fielding, 57, American film score composer and Emmy Award-winner who had been blacklisted during the McCarthy Era before being hired in 1962 by director Otto Preminger; from congestive heart failure.

== February 18, 1980 (Monday) ==
- In elections for the House of Commons of Canada, former prime minister Pierre Trudeau was returned to power when his Liberal Party won 147 of the 282 seats. Prime Minister Joe Clark's Progressive Conservative Party, which had governed with a plurality of 136 seats following the voting of May 22, 1979, lost 33 seats while the Liberals won 33. Trudeau had previously served as prime minister from 1968 to 1979. After forming a government on March 3, Trudeau remained Prime Minister of Canada until resigning on June 30, 1984.
- In elections for the nine seats of the Saint Kitts and Nevis legislative council, Premier Lee Moore's Saint Kitts and Nevis Labour Party (SKNLP) lost 3 of its 7 seats, while Kennedy Simmonds of the People's Action Movement (PAM) won three and was able to form a coalition with the separatist Nevis Reformation Party of Simeon Daniel, which won both of the seats allotted to Nevs. Moore's party had a slim majority of only three votes, with 7,355 compared to the opposition's 7,352. Simmonds would become the nation's first prime minister upon independence on September 19, 1983.
- The United States rejoined the International Labour Organization (ILO) after having been out since November 6, 1977.
- The United States Postal Service began a new policy to remove letters from circulation if they did not include the ZIP code as part of the mailing address. Letters would eventually be delivered, the USPS said, but only after an average delay of two days for finding the ZIP code.
- Born:
  - Florin Cezar Ouatu, Romanian opera singer, in Ploiești
  - Regina Spektor, Russian-born American singer, in Moscow

== February 19, 1980 (Tuesday) ==
- AC/DC lead singer Bon Scott died in a parked car in South London, after a night of heavy drinking. Born as Ronald Belford Scott in Forfar, Scotland, he was only 33. The car's driver, Alistair Kennear, had parked the vehicle in front of Kennear's house on Overhill Road in East Dulwich, after the friend had opted to let Scott get sober.
- A rumor of a breakthrough in the Iran-U.S. hostage crisis became public when U.S. Vice President Walter Mondale told an interviewer the hostage crisis was "nearing an end". Negotiations failed, however, after the Ayatollah Khomeini said in a speech that the embassy seizure had been "a crushing blow" to the U.S. and that the fate of the hostages would wait until a new parliament could be elected. The hostages would remain for 11 more months in captivity.
- Born:
  - Ma Lin, Chinese table tennis player, Olympic gold medalist in 2004 and 2008, and nine-time World Championship gold medalist; in Shenyang, Liaoning province
  - Mike Miller, American basketball player, 2001 NBA Rookie of the Year and 2006 NBA Sixth Man award winner; in Mitchell, South Dakota

== February 20, 1980 (Wednesday) ==
- The deadline for the Soviet Union to withdraw its troops from Afghanistan passed with no action from the Soviets, and led to the United States and other western nations deciding not to send athletes to the 1980 Summer Olympics in Moscow. A spokesman for President Carter announced that the United States would boycott and the president expected the U.S. Olympic Committee and Olympic athletes to follow suit.

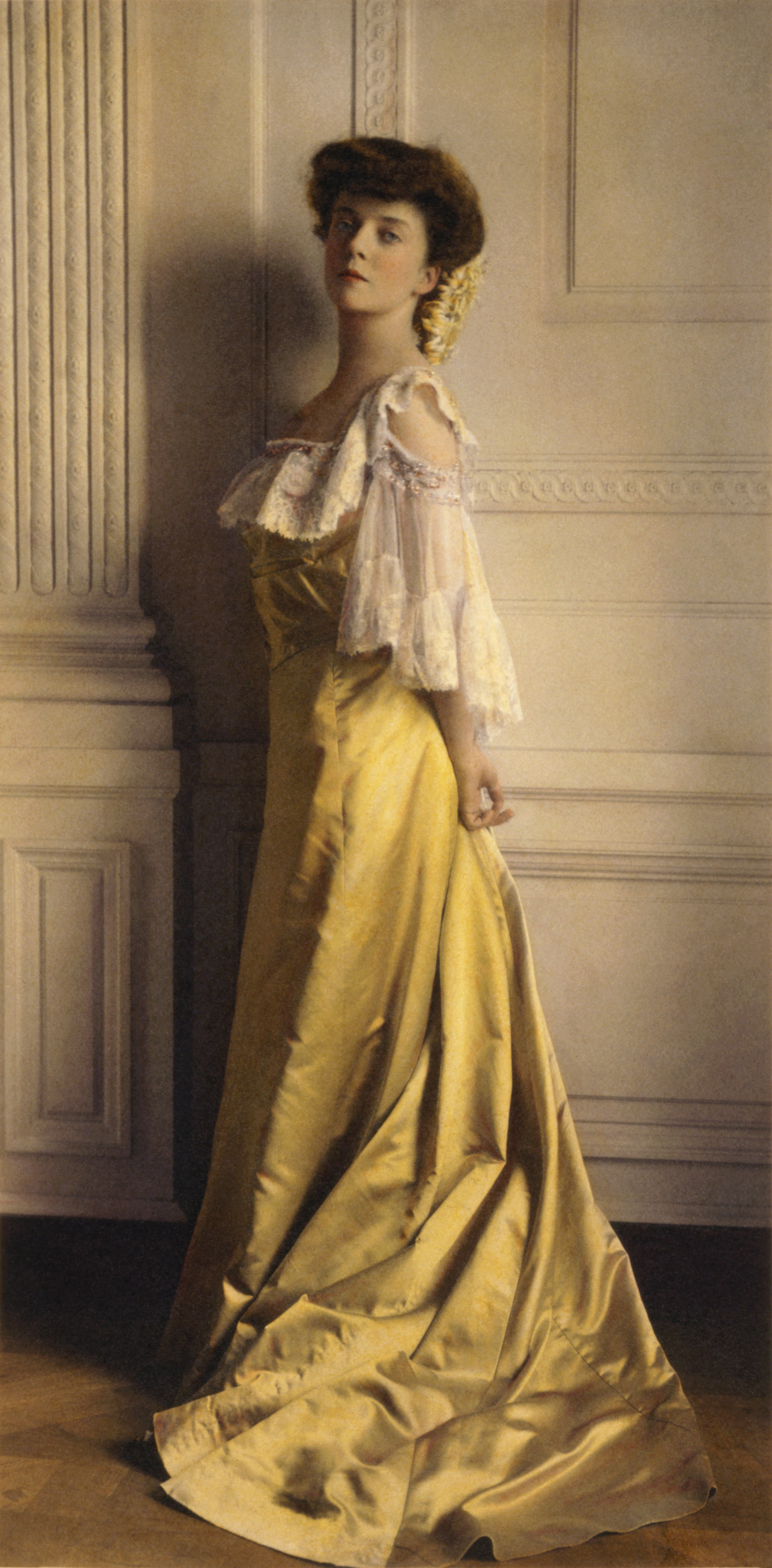
Alice Roosevelt Longworth

- Born:
  - Imanol Harinordoquy, French national rugby union team player; in Bayonne
  - Artur Boruc, Polish soccer football goalkeeper and national team member from 2004 to 2017; in Siedlce
- Died:
  - Alice Roosevelt Longworth, 96, American socialite and activist, daughter of former U.S. President Theodore Roosevelt. Mrs. Longworth had been married in the White House on February 17, 1906.
  - J. B. Rhine, American botanist who founded the study of parapsychology and coined the term "ESP" in his 1934 book Extrasensory Perception.

== February 21, 1980 (Thursday) ==
- Titan Sports, Inc., now World Wrestling Entertainment (WWE), was incorporated by professional wrestling promoter Vince McMahon to purchase his father's company, Capitol Wrestling Corporation, which was operating the World Wrestling Federation. After building the WWF into a multi-billion dollar company, McMahon would rename Titan Sports to World Wrestling Federation, Inc. After a challenge from the World Wildlife Fund over the use of the trademark WWF, and in making a concession that professional wrestling was not purely competitive, emphasized its entertainment value and became WWE in 2002.
- The first online chat service for the general public, "CB Simulator", was launched by CompuServe, the original provider of dial-up connection, by modem, to an electronic information service.
- All 13 people aboard Advance Airlines Flight 4210 were killed when the commuter plane crashed shortly after takeoff from Sydney. Eight of the passengers were on their way home to the small town of Temora, New South Wales, 215 miles (346 km) inland from Sydney, while four others were from Ardlethan, Condobolin and Barmedman, towns near Temora.
- Born:
  - Jigme Khesar Namgyel Wangchuck, King of Bhutan since 2006; in Kathmandu, Nepal
  - Justin Roiland, American animator and voice actor, in Stockton, California

== February 22, 1980 (Friday) ==
- The 3 Hut uprising, an insurrection by merchants in Afghanistan against the Soviet-backed government of Babrak Karmal, began. Over six days, 600 civilians were killed as the Soviet Army sent in tanks to fight the revolt. The leader of the rebellion, Majid Kalakani, was arrested on February 27 and would be executed on June 8.
- The United States Olympic hockey team defeated the Soviet Union, 4 to 3, in the semifinals of the Winter Olympics, in the Miracle on Ice.
- After an inflation rate of 111.4% in 1979, Israel changed its currency from the Israeli pound to the historic unit of coinage, the shekel, at the rate of IS 1 to IL10. On January 1, 1986, the new shekel (worth IS 1,000 or IL10,000) would be issued.
- Born: Jeanette Biedermann, German singer and actress, in Bernau bei Berlin, East Germany

== February 23, 1980 (Saturday) ==
- Forty-six of the 47 people on board an Indian Air Force C-119 transport were killed when a bicyclist crossed the runway as the plane was taking off. When the pilot attempted to miss the person on the runway, the "Flying Boxcar" plane's engines stalled and it came down "right wing low", setting the plane on fire. The accident happened at the Kheria Air Force Station in Agra in the Uttar Pradesh state. Thirty of the victims were paratroopers on a training mission, while 12 others were Indian Air Force officers.
- Former California Governor Ronald Reagan became the front runner for the Republican Party presidential nomination after paying for a debate between himself and the previous front runner, former CIA Director George H. W. Bush.
- The Ayatollah Khomeini frustrated any American hopes that the fifty U.S. Embassy hostages in Iran would be released during the winter. Khomeini told reporters that he would defer to Iran's Parliament, the Majlis, whose members were not scheduled to be elected until April, to decide the fate of the captives.
- American speed skater Eric Heiden became the first person to win five individual gold medals at the Olympics, winning the 10,000 meter speed skating event in a world record time 14 minutes, 28.13 seconds. Heiden had also won medals in the 500m, 1000m, 1500m and 5000m races. Although swimmer Mark Spitz had won seven Olympic gold medals in 1972, three of those wins had been as part of the U.S. team in relay events.
- The College of Magic, the world's only educational institution to train professional magicians, opened in the Southfield section of Grassy Park, a suburb of Cape Town, South Africa. It is now located in the suburb of Claremont.
- Born: Dmitry Sholokhov, Belarusan-born American fashion designer; in Novopolotsk, Byelorussian SSR, Soviet Union

== February 24, 1980 (Sunday) ==
- Salim Lawzi, the wealthy editor and publisher of the world's largest Arab language weekly magazine, Al Hawadeth, was kidnapped as he was being driven to the Beirut airport to fly back to his home in London. The other occupants of Lawzi's car were released by their captors at the town of Damour, but Lawzi's mutilated corpse was found on March 4 in a forest near Aramoun. Although no group claimed responsibility for the murder, Al Hawadeth had recently published articles critical of the regime of Syria's president Hafez al-Assad and the abduction took place after the car had passed through several checkpoints guarded by Syrian Army peacekeeping forces at the Raouché section of Beirut. A post-mortem examination showed that Lawzi had been tortured, with "his writing hand... lacerated to the bone, from fingertips to elbow", and concluded that he had been shot about four days before his body was discovered.
- Born: Emma Johnson, Australian swimmer and 1997 World Champion in the women's 400m medley; in Sydney

== February 25, 1980 (Monday) ==
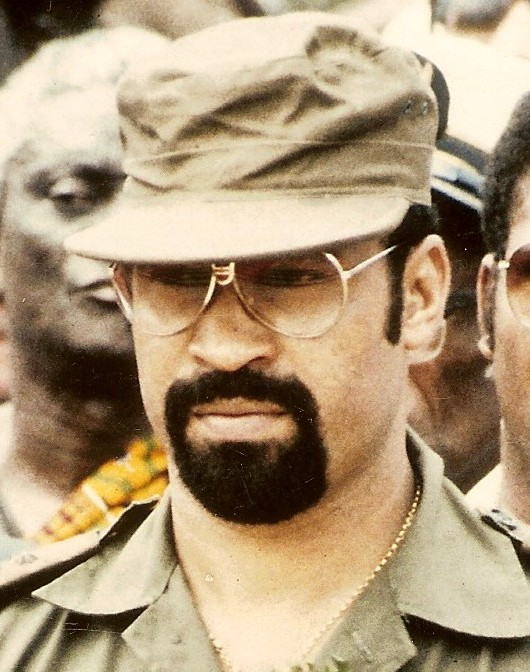
Sergeant Bouterse

- The "Sergeants Coup" in the South American nation of Suriname ousted the government of Prime Minister Henck Arron, after dissatisfaction over working conditions and pay. At 3:00 in the morning, officers of the 800-man Surinamese Army, began the revolt at Army headquarters in Paramaribo, and a rebel-controlled patrol boat began firing artillery shells at the city's police headquarters. Within eight hours, rebels had taken control of Paramaribo, its police stations, its media, and its communications links. Surinamese Army Sergeant Dési Bouterse took control of the government as chairman of the 16-member National Military Council.
- In the sparsely populated Chubut Province in the Patagonia region of southern Argentina, the National University of Patagonia San Juan Bosco was created in Comodoro Rivadavia by the merger of the private University of Patagonia San Juan Bosco and the public National University of Patagonia. It now has campuses in Puerto Madryn, Trelew and Esquel in Chubut Province, and Ushuaia in Tierra del Fuego.
- Serial killer Christine Falling committed the first of six murders of people entrusted to her care, five of them small children and one elderly person. She would finally be caught after the 1982 murder of an infant. After confessing to the murders, Falling would be sentenced to life imprisonment with no possibility of parole for 25 years.
- Born:
  - Christy Knowings, American TV actress, in The Bronx, New York
  - Chris Knowings, American TV actor, in The Bronx, New York
  - Kash Patel, American government official, Director of the FBI, as Kashyap Patel in Garden City, New York

== February 26, 1980 (Tuesday) ==
- Egypt and Israel exchanged ambassadors for the first time in the two nations' history, with Eliyahu Ben-Elissar serving as the first Israeli Ambassador to Egypt, and Saad Mortada as the first Egyptian Ambassador to Israel. In simultaneous ceremonies, Ben-Elissar presented his credentials to Egypt's president Anwar Sadat in Cairo and Mortada presented his to Israel's president Yitzhak Navon in Jerusalem.
- The New Hampshire primary, first of the primary elections to decide a state's choice of delegates for a major party nomination, was held. U.S. President Jimmy Carter won 49% of the vote, with U.S. Senator Edward M. Kennedy finishing a distant second at 38% and California Governor Jerry Brown getting 10%. In the Republican primary, former California Governor Ronald Reagan won 50% of the vote, former U.N. Ambassador George Bush was second with 23%, Tennessee U.S. Senator Howard Baker had 13% and Illinois U.S. Congressman John B. Anderson had 10%.
- Voters approved the creation of the city of West Valley City, Utah by a margin of only 72 votes out of more than 10,000. Henry H. Price of Granger was elected as the first mayor of the 27 square mile city of 75,000 people The final result was 5,185 for and 5,113 against to merge the unincorporated communities of Granger, Hunter, Chesterfield and Redwood southwest of Salt Lake City and is now Utah's second-largest city.
- Born: Georgia Taylor, English TV actress, in Wigan, Greater Manchester
- Died: Ahmad Shukeiri, 72, the original Chairman of the Palestine Liberation Organization (PLO) at its founding in 1964.

== February 27, 1980 (Wednesday) ==
- A group of 30 M-19 guerrillas began the siege of Dominican Republic's Embassy in Bogotá, Colombia, holding 60 people hostage, including 14 ambassadors. The diplomats of the U.S., Mexico, Venezuela, and the Dominican Republic, who negotiated the release of 10 women, a 16-year-old boy, and three wounded men (including Paraguay's acting ambassador, Oscar Gostiaga. The siege would last for 61 days, ending on April 27 with the 16 guerrillas being allowed to fly to Cuba, where they would release their last 12 hostages.
- Under British supervision, parliamentary elections began in Rhodesia for the 80 seats of 100 seats reserved for black candidates, with balloting to continue for three days. The 20 seats reserved for white candidates had been filled earlier in the month. The results of the 1979 election had been set aside after former guerrilla leaders were kept off the ballot, including Robert Mugabe, whose party won 55 of the 80 seats.

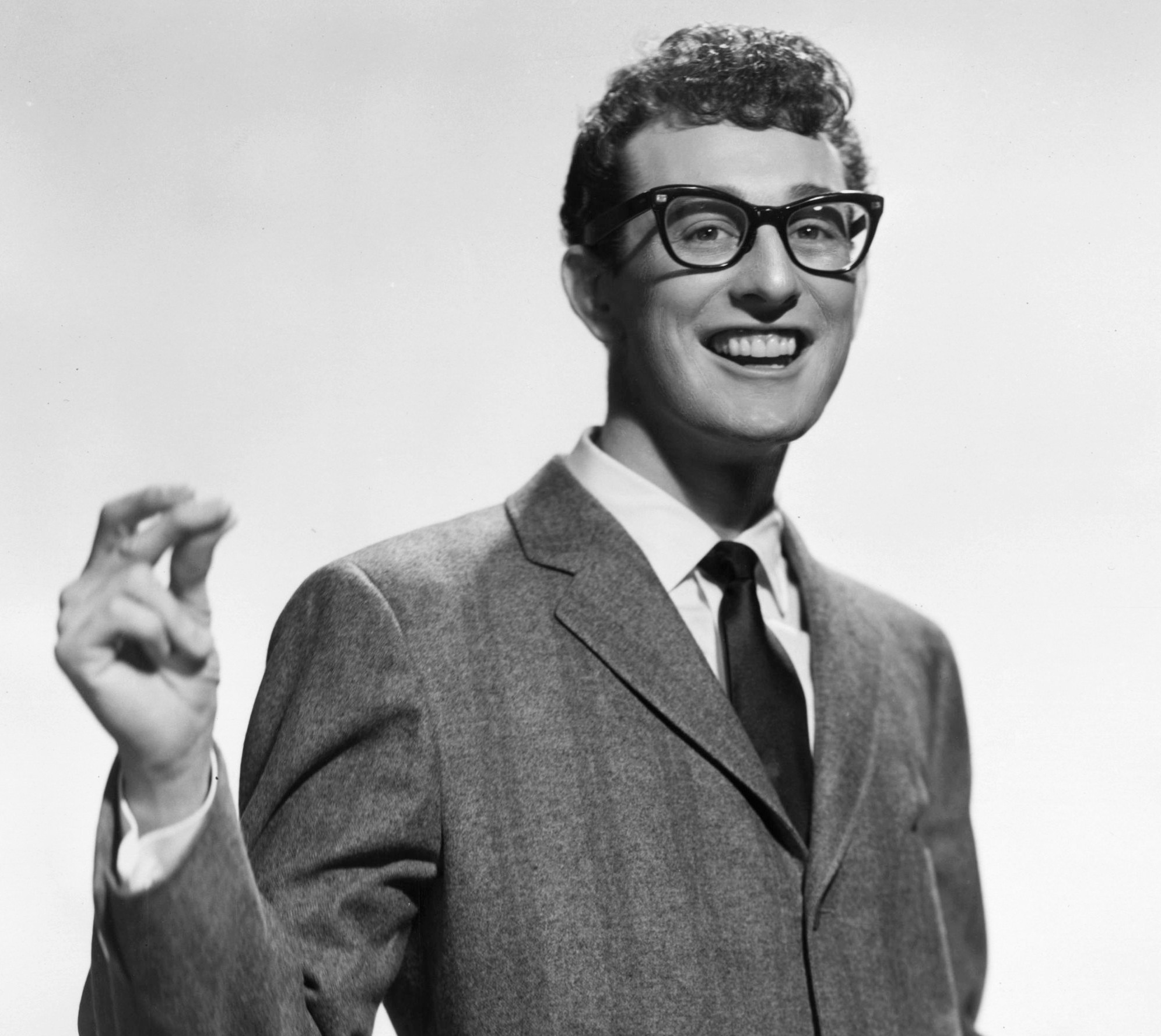
Buddy Holly

- More than 21 years after the death of Buddy Holly in a plane crash, "the most famous eyeglasses in rock and roll history" were found again, in the files of the county courthouse in Mason City, Iowa. The Sheriff of Cerro Gordo County, Jerry Allen, had been going through old court records to look for a file from an old murder case, and ran across an envelope marked "Charles Hardin Holly— recd. April 7, 1959", containing personal effects gathered at the crash site on February 3, 1959 and then misfiled. The envelope also contained the wristwatch of J.P. Richardson, known as "The Big Bopper". Sheriff Allen gave the glasses, which no longer had their lenses, to Buddy's brother, L.O. Holly, who lived in Lubbock, Texas.
- Born:
  - Chelsea Clinton, American journalist, daughter of former U.S. President Bill Clinton and former U.S. Secretary of State Hillary Rodham Clinton; in Little Rock, Arkansas
  - Don Diablo (stage name for Don Pepijn Schipper), Netherlands electronic dance music producer, in Coevorden
- Died: George Tobias, 78, American stage, film and TV actor, best known for portraying Abner Kravitz on Bewitched

== February 28, 1980 (Thursday) ==
- A referendum on autonomy for the Spanish region of Andalusia failed to pass, even though voters favored it by a 55 to 45 percent margin. The conditions of the vote (on whether to allow Andalusians to set their own form of home rule without any approval by Spain's parliament), set by Article 151 of the Spanish Constitution made approval unlikely. Although 55.4 percent of the region's voters and a majority of voters in five of Andalusia's eight provinces approved autonomy, the measure had to receive a 51% majority in all eight provinces. The provinces of Almería, Jaén and Málaga did not produce the required 51% yes vote, while Cádiz, Córdoba, Granada, Huelva, and Seville had been in favor.
- A Guatemalan Air Force C-47, carrying officers of the Guatemalan Army and their families to a vacation in Poptún, crashed after its departure from Guatemala City, killing all 31 people on board.

== February 29, 1980 (Friday) ==
- Liu Shaoqi (Liu Shao-chi), the former President of China who had died in disgrace during the Cultural Revolution, had his reputation rehabilitated by a vote of the Central Committee of the Chinese Communist Party. Liu, who had at one time been designated by Communist Party Chairman Mao Zedong as a successor, fell into disfavor with Mao and died in 1969. Liu's rehabilitation had been pushed by China's de facto leader, Deng Xiaoping, who had himself been rehabilitated after being disgraced during the Cultural Revolution. At the same session, the Central Committee replaced four of the members of the Chinese Communist Party's ruling Politburo, promoting Hu Yaobang and Zhao Ziyang, and removing former Security Director Wang Dongxing and three others who had been staunch supporters of Chairman Mao.
- The Gannett Company launched "Project NN", Chairman Al Neuharth's plan to develop a national newspaper. USA Today would be launched on September 15, 1982.
- Born:
  - Simon Gagné, Canadian ice hockey left winger and Olympic gold medalist (2002)
  - Peter Scanavino, American TV actor, in Denver, Colorado
- Died: Yigal Allon, 61, Israeli politician who served as labour minister and foreign minister at times between 1961 and 1977, and briefly governed as the interim prime minister.
