= Monday Morning (magazine) =

- Cover of Monday Morning magazine
- Categories: News magazine
- Frequency: Weekly
- Country: Lebanon

Monday Morning weekly newspaper (1978)

Monday Morning was an English-language weekly newspaper and then a weekly magazine published in Beirut, Lebanon every Monday. It was purchased by the Dar Alf Leila Wa Leila publishing house which also published the Lebanese Arabic-language daily Al Bayrak and the French-language La Revue du Liban. The print edition ceased as the media company folded.
