= Palestine Liberation Front =

Palestinian political organisation, 1961–1968

The Palestine Liberation Front (PLF) (Arabic: جبهة تحرير فلسطين), also known as the Palestine Liberation Front - The Road to Return, was a Palestinian political organisation founded in Beirut in 1961 or 1963, according to different accounts.

It was founded by Shafiq al-Hout, Ibrahim Abu Lughod, Khaled al-Yashruti, Samira Azzam, Nicola al-Durr, Abdul Muhsen Abu Mayzar, Said Baraka, Raji Sahyoun and others in Beirut in 1961 or 1963. Other supporters over the course of its existence included the poet Muin Bseiso and Bayan Nuwayhed al-Hout.

By the end of 1961, a number of members who were already associated with other political parties felt uncomfortable with their dual commitment. They left, and Shafiq al-Hout, Nicola al-Durr, Samira Azzam, Said Baraka and Abdul Qader al-Daher took on the task of consolidating the organisation, according to Al-Hout.

PLF's slogan was "The path of return is the path of revolution." The front was associated with the weekly magazine Al-Hawadeth, which existed long before and after the period of the PLF's existence. Shafiq al-Hout and Samira Azzam were regular contributors. From 1963 the PLF also issued its own periodical, Tariq al-Awda (Path of Return), a reference to the Palestinian right of return to the lands from which they or their forebears were expelled during the Nakba.

Throughout its existence the PLF agitated for the unity of all the Palestinian factions, and in particular within the Palestine Liberation Organisation (PLO) following its foundation. In 1968, PLF secured the membership of Al-Hout and Ahmed Sidqi al-Dajani in Third Executive Committee of the PLO. That year, the PLF dissolved itself into the PLO.

In English, the name of a different organisation, the Palestinian Liberation Front (جبهة التحرير الفلسطينية), founded by Ahmed Jibril in 1959, is sometimes incorrectly rendered as Palestine Liberation Front. Unlike the Palestinian Liberation Front and most other prominent Palestinian factions of the 1960s, the Palestine Liberation Front had no armed wing.
