= Robert Hatem =

Lebanese writer and refugee

Robert Maroun Hatem (Arabic: روبير حاتم; born c. 1956) known by his code name Cobra, (named after his personal pistol), is the Lebanese former bodyguard and head of security of Elie Hobeika, the leader of the Lebanese Forces at the time. He later moved to France as a political refugee and published his book From Israel to Damascus, which was later banned from being published and distributed in Lebanon for its controversy. The book focuses on Hobeika’s role as a militia leader during the civil war, including corruption and his role in the Sabra and Shatila operation.

== Biography ==
From an early age, Hatem was involved in military trainings in the Lebanese Front and the Kataeb party. In 1972, he moved to Israel to receive training and later became the personal assistant of Elie Hobeika (HK) for 20 years. Cobra moved to France as an asylee, where he wrote his book From Israel to Damascus, which some believe that he released to protect himself from the risk of political assassination because he knew so much sensitive information about HK, who was later assassinated. In 1999 the Lebanese daily Al Bayrak published an interview with Hatem which led to the prosecution of the paper's directors, Melhem Karam and Said Nasreddine. He is believed to be today in Paris.

== See also ==
- Boutros Khawand
- Elias Khoury
- Hanna Atik (a.k.a. 'Hanoun')
- Jocelyne Khoueiry
- Massoud Achkar (a.k.a. 'Poussy' Achkar)
