= Shafiq al-Hout =

Palestinian politician and writer (1932–2009)

Personal details
- Born: 13 January 1932 Jaffa, Mandatory Palestine
- Died: 2 August 2009 (aged 77) Beirut, Lebanon
- Occupation: Secretary-General of the Palestine Liberation Front (1961–68); Member of Palestine Liberation Organization Executive Committee (1966–68; 1991-93); PLO Representative to UNGA (1974–91)

Shafiq al-Hout, also spelled Shafik al-Hut (Arabic: شفيق الحوت; 13 January 1932 – 2 August 2009), was a Palestinian politician and writer. Born in Jaffa, he and his family fled to Beirut at the onset of the 1948 Arab-Israeli War. There, al-Hout became a journalist at Al Hawadeth magazine. Using it as a platform, he founded the Palestine Liberation Front in 1961 and later became a founder of the Palestine Liberation Organization (PLO) in 1964. He remained a senior member of the organization, representing it in Lebanon and the United Nations General Assembly. Initially a close aide to Yasser Arafat, al-Hout resigned from his position on the PLO Executive Committee, in protest of Arafat's signing of the Oslo Accords.

== Early life ==
=== Life in Jaffa ===
Al-Hout was born in Jaffa in 1932 to the mayor of Jaffa at the time, known as the "Beiruti Mayor." He belonged to the al-Hout family which had its roots in Lebanon; Shafiq's grandfather, Salim Youssef al-Hout, was originally from Beirut and immigrated to Jaffa in the late 19th century, settling in the Manshiyyah quarter. While Shafiq's five siblings were born at his grandfather's house, he was born in his parents' home. According to Shafiq, at their grandfather's home, he and his siblings "played [in] for hours on end... Not very far from my house was a sandy playground where we played football with our neighbors."

Al-Hout received his schooling up to high school at the al-Ameriyyah Public School in the same class of Ibrahim Abu-Lughod and Farouk Qaddoumi. He joined the boy scouts, and as a result, was able to form a clear picture about the institution. His first trip was to the Dead Sea. During his childhood, one of his hobbies was visiting movie theaters, which were located in different parts of Jaffa, and swimming in the beaches on the city's coastline.

=== Exodus to Lebanon ===
He graduated from al-Ameriyyah in 1948, and the same year al-Hout fled with his family to Lebanon at the onset of the 1948 Arab-Israeli War. Prior to their departure, in April, his brother Jamal, a Palestinian fighter who he described as "very spiritual", was killed. The al-Hout family was given a free visa by the Lebanese consul in Jaffa and boarded the Greek vessel Dolores Upon their arrival to Beirut, their Lebanese cousin received them and they stayed in his house temporarily before renting an apartment in the city. Locals began to call al-Hout al-Yafawi ("the man from Jaffa").

Al-Hout entered the American University of Beirut (AUB) in 1949. While at the university, he said many people attempted to influence his political beliefs, including George Habash of the Arab Nationalist Movement and Communists who favored an alliance with Soviet Union. Al-Hout and his colleagues decided to establish a Palestinian club in Lebanon, but this was met by opposition from Hajj Amin al-Husayni's followers who at one time "severely beat" them in an ambush at a Palestinian refugee camp.

Afterward, al-Hout decided to shift his focus to the AUB's campus where Ba'athists, other Arab nationalists, and Communists campaigned for support. He decided to join the Communists and in 1951 was detained for his activities by a presidential decree. He was sentenced to three months in prison and deportation from Lebanon, but his family convinced Lebanese prime minister Sami as-Solh to suspend the sentence. By then, al-Hout's father was forced to ask for UNRWA rations due to his financial situation and al-Hout was suspended from the AUB for one year. He would graduate from the university with a BA in psychology in 1953.

== Teaching and writing career ==
After graduating from the AUB, he took up the profession of being a teacher in Beirut's al-Maqassed School, but the administration disliked the discussions he frequently held with the students on the subject of the Palestinian cause, and eventually removed him from his post. Prior to his emigration to Kuwait in 1956 for another teaching job, al-Hout obtained Lebanese citizenship, despite reservations by his father. It was during his brief stay in Kuwait that he met Yasser Arafat and other Palestinian activists. Two years later, after correspondence with Salim al-Lawzi, he returned to Lebanon where he was given the post of chief editor at the Lebanese magazine Al Hawadeth run by al-Lawzi. He soon gained a reputation of being a Nasserist—a supporter of Egyptian president at the time, Gamal Abdel Nasser—journalist.

== Political career ==
=== Founding of the PLF and PLO ===
Al-Hout was one of the founders of the Palestine Liberation Front (PLF) in 1961, the Palestinian faction which he supported throughout his life. Through Al Hawadeth as a platform, al-Hout was able to start the underground political movement and issued a monthly newsletter titled Tariq al-Awda, or "The Path of Return," which until 1964 was printed at Al Hawadeth Printing House. Prior to that, he helped establish the PLF's newspaper Abtal al-Awda ("Heroes of the Return") in 1960.

Membership in the PLF increased steadily and according to al-Hout, by 1964 it included "newcomers from the refugee camps in Lebanon, Kuwait, Syria, Jordan, Amman, the West Bank, as well as people belonging to the different Palestinian classes, ranging from simple workers to teachers and engineers." Their stated aim was to struggle for the liberation of Palestine" and emphasize the Arab character of that cause.

Al-Hout later served as Deputy Secretary-General of the Arab Journalists Union in 1963 and held this post until 1967. He formed an alliance with Ahmed Shukeiri, the Chairman of the Palestine Liberation Organization (PLO) and attended the first conference by the Palestinian National Council (PNC) in Jerusalem in May 1964, becoming an original founder. He resigned from his post at Al Hawadeth to focus on his new post within the PLO.

Al-Hout was appointed representative and head of the organization's office in Lebanon in 1965, then joined the PLO's Executive Committee, during its first meeting in July 1966. Al-Hout encouraged the formation of sports clubs and scout troops in the refugee camps in Lebanon, partly as a means to recruit more refugees into the PLF, and tried to extend these program into the camps of Syria under the guise of the Palestinian Popular Organization. In spring 1966, he allied the PLF with the Palestinian National Liberation Front, a Nasserist faction. Because of internal and external struggles in the PLO, he abdicated his position in the PLO-EC and his post as head of the PLF in the summer of 1968, leaving the latter group leaderless. That same year al-Hout became a founding member of the Union of Palestinian Writers. A number of other posts were also held by him, including membership in the Executive Committee of the International Organization of Journalists from 1964 to 1976.

In retaliation for publishing editorials critical of Syrian policy, gunmen from the pro-Syrian faction as-Sa'iqa attacked the Beirut offices of PLO newspapers. They killed two journalists, but failed in assassinating al-Hout who wrote satirical columns for the daily al-Moharrer ("the Editor") at the time. From 1974, al-Hout represented the PLO at the United Nations General Assembly (UNGA). In 1975, he was foundator of the PLO Office in Japan.

During the Lebanese Civil War, beginning in 1976, the 1982 Lebanon War, and the Sabra and Shatila massacre, al-Hout survived ten Israeli assassination attempts. He remained in Lebanon when Arafat and most of the PLO leadership were exiled from the country. As the PLO's representative to Lebanon, following the defeat of the organization to Israeli forces in 1982, al-Hout was responsible for handing over its remaining weapons to the Lebanese Army after most of its heavy weaponry was donated to their ally, the Lebanese National Movement (LNM). On 19 December 1984, he stated "The establishment of a Palestinian state over part of the Palestinian soil does not amount to the renunciation of the strategic aim. It is a pity that Israel realizes that... and knows that the establishment of such a state constitutes the reassertion of Palestinian national identity and the beginning of the end for Israel."

=== Oslo and later life ===
In 1991, Arafat—wanting his admired, but loud-spoken, friend inside the leading circle—reappointed al-Hout to the PLO-EC. He then became a founding member of the Arab National Conference in 1992. In response to the 1993 Oslo Accords signed by Yasser Arafat, al-Hout resigned from his post in August 1993 in the PLO-EC along with Palestinian cultural chief Mahmoud Darwish and discontinued to represent the PLO at the UNGA. Al-Hout strongly advocated that all of historical Palestine belonged to the Palestinians, in one state, rejecting the two-state solution agreed on in the accords.

Nonetheless, al-Hout remained a member of the PNC until his death, but retired from politics. Instead, he began writing his memoirs and continued writing about Arab nationalism. He was one of nine PLO-EC members, who signed a statement rejecting the Interim Agreement on the West Bank and the Gaza Strip—which would give the Palestinians limited self-rule over Gaza and Jericho—on 4 October 1995. Al-Hout stated he and many Palestinian refugees were worried that "Gaza and Jericho first" might be "Gaza and Jericho last." He remained critical of the PLO leadership's stance and helped in the coordination of the Damascus-based Palestinian groups. Since 1996 he had been a member of the National Islamic Conference and became a founder of Mu'tamar al-Awda ("the Return Conference") since 2002. According to The Guardian, al-Hout viewed recent Palestinian developments with "dejection and pessimism, though never despair."

== Death ==
Al-Hout died at the age of 77 on 2 August 2009. The cause of his death was not clear, but an official at the Palestinian National Authority said he died of cancer. He is survived by his son Hader, his two daughters Hanine and Syrine, and wife Bayan Nuwayhed. After a funeral service at al-Imam Ali mosque in Tariq al-Jdeideh, Lebanon, al-Hout's body was carried to the Martyrs of the Palestinian Revolution cemetery in the Shatila refugee camp.

Attendees at the funeral procession included Lebanon's former Prime Minister Fouad Siniora, Lebanese MPs Alaaeddine Terro, Walid Jumblatt and Imad al-Hout. Also attending was the representative of Mahmoud Abbas in Lebanon, Asaad Abdel Rahman, former deputy speaker Elie al-Firzili, the head of the Journalists' Union Melhem Karam, an Amal delegation headed by the president of Amal's political bureau Jamil Hayek, and a Hamas representative in Lebanon, Ali Baraka. Karam commemorated al-Hout and gave condolences to his family, saying in his eulogy, "Each moment of his life was filled with struggle and resistance... He wrote for a cause: for the dignity of the Arab people and for the holy land he tried his whole life to retrieve."

== List of literary works ==
Al-Hout authored several books in Arabic on the Palestinian issue.

- The Left and Arab Nationalism. (1959) Cairo. (in Arabic)
- The Palestinian between Diaspora and State (1977) Beirut. (in Arabic)
- Moments of History (1986) Jeddah (in Arabic)
- Twenty Years with the PLO: Memoirs (1986) Beirut. (in Arabic)
- Gaza-Jericho Agreement First: The Inadmissible Agreement (1994) Beirut. (in Arabic)

His autobiography was translated and published in English in 2011:

- al-Hout, Shafiq (2001). My Life in the PLO: The Inside Story of the Palestinian Struggle. Pluto Press. ISBN 0-74-532883-0.

== Bibliography ==
- Rubin, Barry (1994), Revolution until victory?: the politics and history of the PLO, Harvard University Press, ISBN 0-674-76803-5
- Sayigh, Yezid (1997), Armed struggle and the search for state: the Palestinian national movement, 1949-1993, Oxford University Press US, ISBN 0-19-829265-1
