= Nahida Nakad =

- Born: March 15, 1960 (age 66); Lebanon
- Education: American University of Beirut; St Mary’s College, California
- Occupations: Deputy Director of FRANCE 24’s Arabic Service; Deputy Director of news and programs at Monte Carlo Doualiya
- Years active: 1982–present
- Children: Alexander

Nahida Nakad (Arabic: ناهدة نكد; born March 15, 1960, in Lebanon) is a Lebanese and Italian TV reporter and journalist. She was editorial director of FRANCE 24 TV station and Monte Carlo Doualiya Arabic language radio. Author of three books in French (Un couple dans la Guerre, A la Recherche du Liban Perdu, and Derrière Le Voile). Nahida Nakad Receives "Arab Woman of the Year" Distinction at the Takreem Arab Achievement Awards. She was the Head of the Arabic Service at “Audiovisuel Extérieur de France” since 2009. Since 2013 she is a consultant in international relations at Public Diplomacy. She holds a Bachelor of Arts degree in Journalism and Political Science from St Mary's College, California and the American University of Beirut.

== Awards & honors ==
- Arab Woman of the Year Award by the Takreem Arab Achievement Awards in 2010
- Trophée du Public de Femmes en Or 2014.

== Publications ==
- Un couple dans la guerre published by Calmann-Lévy
- A la Recherche du Liban Perdu published by Calmann-Lévy
- Derrière le Voile published by Don Quixote

== Personal life ==
She is fluent in Arabic, French, English and Italian.

== Career timeline ==
- 1982–1985: Journalist and reporter for Al Hawadeth magazine in London
- 1987-1991: Producer-journalist in TF1's bureau in Rome
- 1991-1994: Journalist in TF1's foreign service in Paris
- 1994–2008: Senior reporter for TF1
- 2008- FEB 2012: Head of the Arabic department of France 24 and Monte Carlo Doualiya Radio
- Feb 2012 : Editorial director three language channel France 24
- Feb 2013–present: International consultant at Public Diplomacy
