= Al Bayrak =

Lebanese daily newspaper (1911–2011)

- Type: Daily newspaper
- Founder: Said Akl
- Publisher: Dar Alf Leila Wa Leila
- Editor-in-chief: Said Nassereddine; Melhem Karam
- Founded: 1911
- Ceased publication: August 2011
- Language: Arabic
- City: Beirut
- Country: Lebanon

Al Bayrak (Arabic: البيرق, romanized: The Flag) was a daily newspaper published in Beirut, Lebanon. It was one of the leading and oldest Arabic papers in the country. After being published for a century, the paper ceased publication in August 2011.

== History ==
Al Bayrak was founded in 1911. Its founder was the Lebanese poet Said Akl. The publisher was the Dar Alf Leila Wa Leila publishing house, which owned a number of daily and weekly publications in Lebanon and in Europe, including Al Hawadeth, Monday Morning and La Revue du Liban. The company was headed by Melhem Karam.

In the 1990s Melhem Karam was the editor and Said Nassereddine the editor-in-chief of the daily. Then Karam who was also the president of Lebanese Journalists Association served as the editor-in-chief. The daily folded in August 2011 due to financial problems.

== Influence and political orientation ==
In 2009, the IREX, an international research board, cited the daily as one of the major eleven papers published in Lebanon. In the initial phase of the Lebanese civil war in 1975, it had a pro-government stance. In the early 1980s the western media described the daily as conservative. It was one of the newspapers which advocated the March 14 alliance in 2009.

== Content ==
In 1999, Al Bayrak published an interview with Robert Hatem, who was the author of From Israel to Damascus banned in Lebanon. Due to the publication of the interview the Beirut Appeals Court prosecuted Melhem Karam and Said Nassereddine, who were editor and editor-in-chief of the paper, respectively. Following the assassination of Lebanese journalist and lawmaker Gebran Tueni in December 2005, the headline of the daily was "Enough...".

== Bans and attacks ==
The daily was banned by Michel Aoun, then interim prime minister and army commander, on 19 January 1990 due to its clash with Aoun's policies. In the immediate aftermath of the ban a reporter working for the daily, George Hajj, was abducted in Beirut and was freed eight hours later. Aoun was accused of the abduction.
