= Sammy Flex =

Ghanaian entertainment journalist

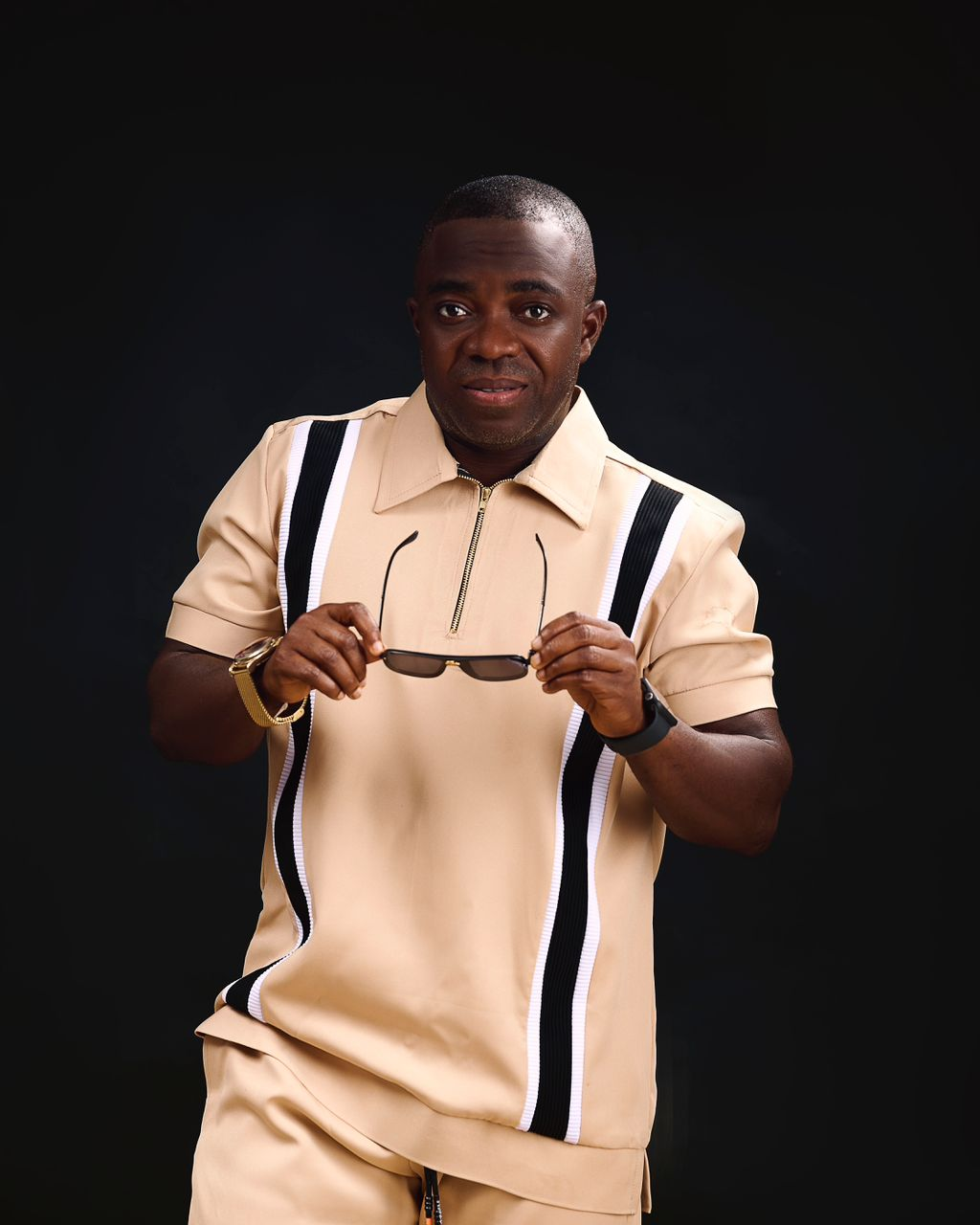
- Born: March 26, 1980 (age 46); Accra, Ghana
- Occupations: Journalist, Broadcaster and PR
- Years active: 2007–present
- Website: http://sammyflextv.com/ https://www.youtube.com/c/SammyFlexTV

Samuel Atuobi Baah known professionally as Sammy Flex is a Ghanaian journalist, broadcaster and PR. He is the CEO and Chief editor of award-winning Ghanaian Entertainment newspaper Flex Newspaper. He was the communication manager for Zylofon Media and also the manager for highlife singer Kumi Guitar and Zylofon Media (Radio and TV) as well. Sammy Flex currently is the Ceo of Flex Entertainment Ltd, managers of Sammy Flex TV on YouTube and www.sammyflextv.com and he doubles as the manager of Ghanaian Dancehall musician Shatta Wale.

== Early life and career ==
Sammy was on 26 March 1980 born in Accra to Mr Emmanuel Kofi Atuobi and Madam Comfort Baah. He is the last of four siblings.

He completed Oda Secondary School and continued to pursue a Diploma in Journalism and PR from ICM, UK. He pursued a short course in PR at the Ghana Institute of Journalism before completing Journalism and Media Studies at Manifold Institute.

=== Career ===
Sammy started as a writer of his self-owned newspaper Flex Newspaper in May 2007, the newspaper captured all the important stories, event, interviews and the Ghanaian showbiz industry. He later become the managing Director and CEO of Flex Newspaper. Along the line, Sammy worked as a Radio and TV pundit with Happy FM, Channel R, Great FM, ETV Ghana and GTV talking about showbiz in Ghana.

In 2013, Sammy Flex joined PLUZZ FM as the host of their AM PLUZZ, a morning show that talks about showbiz in Ghana. During his times with PLUZZ FM, he hosted the Entertainment Capital show on Capital TV. He also hosted Weekend Edition on TV7 in 2016 and Atinka TV's Entertainment City in 2017. Sammy was known to have joined Okay Fm as a host of its Drive Time but was later seen with Atinka FM.

After quitting Atinka TV and FM, Sammy Flex later joined Zylofon Media as their communications manager and host of Showbiz Agenda on Zylofon FM. Currently, he is the manager for Zylofon Media where he takes care of activities of the Radio and Television station. Sammy Flex resigned as the communication manager and host of Showbiz Agenda on Zylofon FM in the year 2021. He is now the CEO of Sammy Flex TV, Ghana's Popular YouTube Channel with over 100k subscribers, that talks entertainment and more

Also whiles doing his YouTube content on Sammy Flex TV he combined with a show on CTV called Class Showbiz. He had his first show on Monday 12 September 2022, it aired on Mondays-Thursday with Experienced pundits like kojo kinn, Ricky Tennesson, Nana Reagan and many more. Class Showbiz’ held discussions on matters arising in the entertainment industry, and interview notable industry figures, local and international.He is now the manager of Ghana's biggest Artiste Shatta Wale, He officially announced this on 26 September 2023 after assisting him for some time.

He said "I am sure over the few months that we have worked, Shatta has seen the contribution I have brought to his music business, career and personal life as well and at the moment he feels if you want to get to work with someone, you give what is called probation or what we call the trying moment, when you have to learn this and learn that. I am sure after some months, the gentleman feels that I have what it takes, the spirit, the enthusiasm; I have that kind of love for what he is doing so the best he can do is to place me to do his work as a manager, and I couldn't say no," 

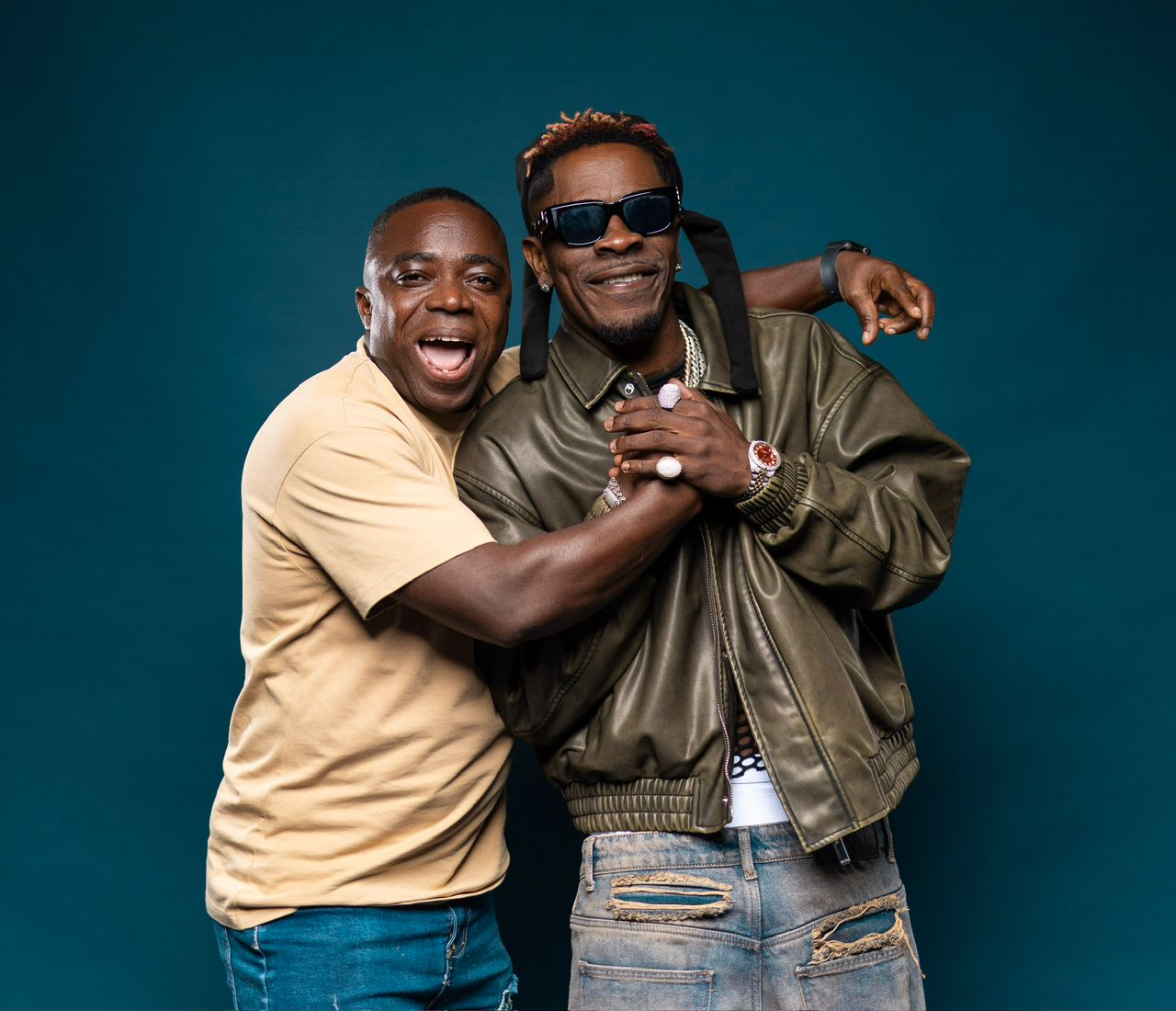
Shatta Wale and Manager

=== Managing career ===
NKZ Music, management of Ghanaian musician Guru confirmed Sammy Flex as a communications manager to secure event for Guru both locally and internationally as well as public relation issues. He also served as the publicist for Nacee. He was the manager for Qwarme Zaggy until he was assigned to manage highlife musician Kumi Guitar as the first signee of Zylofon Media. and currently he's the manager for Shatta Wale, one of the biggest dancehall artiste in Ghana and Africa at large. https://www.myjoyonline.com/im-now-officially-shatta-wales-manager-sammy-flex/

== Personal life ==
Sammy is married to Mrs Grace Baah with four daughters.

== Awards and nominations ==
Year	Event	Prize	Nominated work	Result	Ref
2016	RTP Awards	Radio Entertainment Talk Show Host	Himself	Nominated	
2017	People's Celebrity Awards	Favorite Male TV Presenter	Himself	Nominated	
2018	RTP Awards	Radio Entertainment Talk Show Host	Himself	Nominated	
2018	Movie Summit Honorary Award	Honours			
2018	Hyperlink Media Awards	ENTERTAINMENT MEDIA PERSONALITY OF THE YEAR	Himself	Nominated	
