= La Revue du Liban =

Weekly news magazines (1928–2011)

- Cover of La Revue du Liban
- Editor-in-chief: Melhem Karam
- Categories: News magazine
- Frequency: Weekly
- Publisher: Dar Alf Leila Wa Leila
- Founded: 1928
- Final issue: 2011
- Country: Lebanon
- Based in: Beirut
- Language: French

La Revue du Liban (full title: La Revue du Liban et de l'Orient Arabe) was a long-running French-language weekly magazine published in Beirut, Lebanon. It was published from 1928 till 2011.

== History and profile ==
The magazine was founded in 1928. It was purchased by Dar Alf Leila Wa Leila publishing house which also published the Lebanese Arabic-language daily Al Bayrak and Al Hawadeth. The company was owned by Melhem Karam who also served as the editor-in-chief of La Revue du Liban. The print edition of the magazine ceased as the media company folded in 2011. The magazine continued as an online publication before folding altogether.
