= Salim Lawzi =

Lebanese journalist (1922–1980)

- Born: 1922; Tripoli, Lebanon
- Died: c. March 1980 (aged 57–58); Lebanon
- Other names: Salim El-Lozi; Salim Al-Lawzi
- Occupation: Journalism
- Known for: Founder and editor-in-chief of Al Hawadeth weekly

Salim Lawzi (Arabic: سليم اللوزي) (1922 – c. March 1980), alternatively written Salim El-Lozi or Salim Al-Lawzi, was a well-known Lebanese journalist and publisher, founder and editor-in-chief of the weekly Al Hawadeth magazine. Lawzi died after being kidnapped on 25 February 1980, then brutally tortured and murdered. His body was found on 4 March 1980. Neither precise date of death nor the identity of killers was revealed, but it was widely suspected that the assassination was ordered and/or executed by the Syrian Intelligence.

Lawzi had established a number of publications, and most notably the Lebanese Al Hawadeth magazine (Arabic: الحوادث), which he had turned into one of the biggest and most prominent pan-Arab political weekly publications.

== Early life and education ==
Lawzi was born in Tripoli, Lebanon, in 1922 and had his studies at Sanayeh school in Beirut.

== Career ==
Lawzi travelled to Jaffa, Palestine in the early 1940s for better opportunities. In 1944 he became a radio journalist in Near East Radio where he wrote radio plays. In the late 1940s, he quit the radio to start writing for the famous Egyptian Rose al-Yūsuf. He had to return to Beirut after criticizing the Egyptian Prime Minister and started writing for Lebanese Assayad weekly. After the 23 July Revolution in Egypt, he worked in Al Goumhour al Gadeed and correspondent to two publications, namely Al Musawwar and Al Kawakeb.

Becoming a renowned pan-Arab journalist and writer, he acquired Al Hawadeth in 1955. In 1957, it took the side of opposition to the Lebanese government during the rule of President Camille Chamoun, and because of his criticism was jailed and his magazine temporarily suspended in May 1957. He returned after release launching his weekly into a prominent pan-Arab weekly.

With the Lebanese Civil War of 1975, his criticism of the Syrian role in Lebanon escalated leading to serious threats on his life. The Hawadeth main building was destroyed during the war. Fearing for his life due to the threats he was receiving, Lawzi chose self-exile in London, from where he continued editing his magazine. He particularly criticized harshly the Syrian interference in Lebanon during the Lebanese Civil War. He wrote novels, including Al-Mouhajiroun, published in English translation as The Emigres (Allison and Busby, 1978).

== Kidnapping and death ==
When his mother died in February 1980, Lawzi decided to return to Lebanon to attend her funeral. Despite close friends and relatives strongly advising him not to, he refused to listen and decided to return to Lebanon for a few days. After descending in Beirut International Airport, he was kidnapped by gunmen on the Airport Road on 25 February 1980. His heavily bruised tortured body was found nine days later on 4 March 1980 in Aramoun, on the outskirts of Beirut. Forensic reports found heavy signs of torture, including a broken and dislocated right arm, maimed and disjointed writing hand, fingers burnt and blackened through use of acid and phosphoric substances, pens pierced into abdomen and intestines (obvious messages in mutilation for other critics of Syria) and an assassination-style bullet in the head. Alleged perpetrator was the Syrian intelligence agents.

== See also ==
- List of assassinated Lebanese people
