= Melhem Karam =

Lebanese journalist (1932–2010)

- Born: 1932; Chouf, Lebanon
- Died: 23 May 2010 (aged 77–78)
- Education: Saint Joseph University; Lebanese University
- Occupation: Journalist
- Years active: 1950s–2010
- Spouse: Leila Mubarak
- Children: 3
- Parents: Karam Melhem Karam (father); Emilie Asmar (mother)
- Awards: Legion of Honor (France); National Order of the Cedar (Lebanon); National Order of Merit (France)

Melhem Karam (1932–2010) was a Lebanese writer and journalist who owned many publications, including Al Bayrak daily newspaper and Al Hawadeth weekly magazine. He was also the president of the Lebanese Journalists Union for nearly 50 years between 1961 and 2010.

== Early life and education ==
Karam was born in Chouf, Deir al Qamar, in 1932. His parents were Karam Melhem Karam, an author, and Emilie Asmar. They were Maronites. He had two sisters and a brother, Issam Karam (died March 2020), who was the head of Beirut Bar Association.

Karam graduated from the Sagesse high school and then, studied law at the Saint Joseph University and at the Lebanese University.

== Career ==
During his studies at the university Karam worked for different Lebanese newspapers and magazines. In 1961 Karam was elected as the head of the Lebanese Journalists Union which he held until his death in 2010. He was also the vice president of the Arab Journalists' Federation and of the International Journalists' League.

Karam was the owner of the publishing house, Dar Alf Leila Wa Leila, which produced several publications, including Arabic weekly magazine Al Hawadeth, Al Bayrak daily newspaper, La Revue du Liban magazine and Monday Morning magazine. He also served as the editor-in-chief of these publications. He made many interviews with leading politicians, including Hosni Mubarak, King Fahd and King Hussein.

=== Books ===
Karam was the author of the following books: The Storm, A Thousand and One Nights and The Secrets.

== Personal life and death ==
Karam married Leila Mubarak with whom he had three children. He died from a heart attack on 23 May 2010.

=== Awards ===
Karam was the recipient of the following: Legion of Honor (France; 1985), National Order of the Cedar (Officer, 1987) and National Order of Merit (France; Officer, 1988).
