= Al Hawadeth =

Lebanese news weekly (1911–2014)

- Editor-in-chief: Salim Lawzi (1955–1980); Melhem Karam
- Categories: Newsweekly
- Frequency: Weekly
- Publisher: Latfallah Khyat; Dar Alf Leila Wa Leila
- Founder: Latfallah Khyat
- Founded: 1911
- Final issue: 2014
- Country: Lebanon
- Based in: Beirut
- Language: Arabic
- ISSN: 0440-4491
- OCLC: 6284723

Al Hawadeth (Arabic: الحوادث, romanized: al-Ḥawādith, lit. 'The Events') was a weekly news magazine which was published in Beirut, Lebanon, in the period 1911–2014 with some interruptions. The magazine is known for its publishers and editors: Salim Lawzi who was assassinated in March 1980, and Melhem Karam, who was a veteran journalist.

== History and profile ==
Al Hawadeth was launched in Beirut in 1911. The founder was Latfallah Khyat who was also the publisher of the magazine. Salim Lawzi acquired it in 1955 and was its editor-in-chief until his assassination in 1980. It was published on a weekly basis. Al Hawadeth was temporarily stopped publication shortly after the start of unrest in Lebanon in 1958 when Lawzi left Lebanon for Syria. Following his return to Lebanon the magazine was restarted. On 30 September 1961 the offices of the magazine were attacked with the sticks of dynamite which caused slight damages.

Al Hawadeth was suspended by the Ministry of Information for five days on 27 June 1962 due to the publication of an article which allegedly defamed the Syrian President Nazim al-Qudsi. The magazine was again temporarily suspended on 14 July 1977 for one week when its Beirut office was attacked, and following this incident Lawzi settled in the United Kingdom. Al Hawadeth continued its publication in London for a while. There an English edition of the magazine was started with the title of Events. The magazine had a pro-Saudi political stance during the ownership of Salim Lawzi.

Later Al Hawadeth was relocated in Beirut and owned and edited by the leading Lebanese journalist Melhem Karam until 2010. He died from a heart attack on 23 May 2010. Under his ownership its publisher was Dar Alf Leila Wa Leila which also published Al Bayrak, La Revue du Liban and Monday Morning. Al Hawadeth ceased publication in 2014.

=== Contributors, political stance and content ===
Syrian novelist Ghada Samman joined the magazine as a correspondent in 1969. One of the contributors of Al Hawadeth during its London period was Nahida Nakad who started her journalistic career in the magazine. Palestinian writers Samira Azzam and Shafiq al-Hout were among its regular contributors. The latter was a member of the Palestine Liberation Organization (PLO) and the founder of the Palestine Liberation Front (PLF) based in Beirut.

Al Hawadeth was a pro-Egyptian or pro-Nasserist publication which supported the Arab Nationalist Movement in the mid-1960s. During this period it extensively covered the activities of the Fatah and other Palestinian groups against Israel. The magazine also functioned as a mouthpiece of the PLO and PLF in the same period.

Al Hawadeth issued interviews with various leading figures. One of them was with the Saudi Arabian ruler King Faisal in August 1973 during the oil crisis. In October 1974 Prince Fahd, second deputy prime minister of Saudi Arabia and later King Fahd, also gave an interview to the magazine covertly criticizing King Faisal and other radical Arab leaders using oil as a weapon against the USA.

The magazine interviewed with Egyptian President Anwar Sadat in May 1975 who declared that Egypt was planning to pay its debt to the Soviet Union through the financial aid from the USA.

Another significant interview published in Al Hawadeth was with Musa Al Sadr, a Shia figure, in November 1977. Al Sadr's relation with the Imperial Iran was strained due to his speech at the funeral ceremony of Ali Shariati in Sayyidah Zaynab Mosque, Damascus, Syria, on 26 June 1977. Because the leading Iranian revolutionaries who were against the rule of Shah Mohammad Reza Pahlavi participated in the funeral. The Palestinian author Mahmoud Darwish gave an interview to Al Hawadeth in Spain after he left Beirut.
