= The Land of Sad Oranges =

1962 book by Ghassan Kanafani

- Author: Ghassan Kanafani
- Language: Arabic
- Genre: Novel
- Publication date: 1962
- ISBN: 978-9963610808

The Land of Sad Oranges (Arabic: أرض البرتقال الحزين) is the second collection of stories written by the Palestinian writer Ghassan Kanafani. Originally published in 1962, the stories follow the perspective of a Palestinian as they and their family are dispossessed in the wake of the 1948 Palestine war.

== Writer ==
Ghassan Kanafani (born in Acre on 8 April 1936 and died in Beirut on 8 July 1972) was a famous Palestinian novelist, narrator and journalist of the twentieth century.

As a member of the Popular Front for the Liberation of Palestine's political bureau, he focused on Palestinian emancipation. He and his family were forced to evacuate in 1948, and he spent time in Syria before settling in Lebanon, where he obtained Lebanese citizenship. In 1952, he graduated from high school in Damascus with a Syrian baccalaureate. In the same year, he enrolled in the college of Arab Literature at Damascus University, but dropped out at the end of the second year to join the Movement of Arab Nationalists, which George Habash joined upon meeting them in 1953. He worked in the primary education in Kuwait, then proceeded to Beirut in 1960 to work for al-Hurriya where he was in charge of the magazine's cultural department. From 1962-1967, he became the editor of Al Muharrir (The Liberator), followed by Al Anwar (The Illumination) and its sister publication Assayad magazine. Kanafani joined the Popular Front for the Liberation of Palestine (PFLP) in 1967 and, two years later, began editing its magazine Al Hadaf (The Goal).

Kanafani was diagnosed with diabetes at a young age. He had two sons, Fayiz and Laila, with his wife Anni Høver. At 36 years old he was assassinated by the Israeli intelligence service Mossad on 8 July 1972 by detonating his car in the Hazmiyeh area near Beirut. Bassam Abu Sharif received Al Hadaf's editorial after Kanafani's death.

== Contents ==
The twelve stories in the collection are:

- Beyond Borders (original title: Ābʿd mn ālḥdwd)
- The Horizon Behind the Gate (original title: ālāwfwq wārāʾ ālbwābā)
- Forbidden Weapon (original title: ālāwfwq wārāʾ ālbwābā)
- 3 papers from Palestine (original title:ṯlāṯẗ āwrāq mēn flsṭyn):
1. Paper from Ramla (original title: wārāqā mēn ālrāmlā)
2. Paper from Bird (original title: wārāqā mēn ālṭyrā)
3. Paper from Gaza (original title: wārāqā mēn ġāzā)
- Green and Red (original title: ālāẖḍr w ālāḥmr):
1. Fight (original title: ālnēzāl)
2. Death Schedule (original title: ḥdwl ālmwtt)
3. Death to rival (original title: ālmwt llnād)
- The Land of Sad Oranges
- Fuse in Mosul (original title: ftyl fy ālmwṣl)
- None (original title: lā šyʾ)
