= The Stolen Shirt =

Palestinian novel

The Stolen Shirt is one of the first published stories by the Palestinian militant and author, Ghassan Kanafani. It was published as part of his first short story collection, Death Bed No. 12 in 1958. The story won first place in a literary competition in Kuwait. In it, Kanafani looks at Palestinian suffering under the occupation through his employment of symbols.

== Plot ==
The story revolves around the protagonist, Abu Al-Abd, who is a Palestinian refugee living in a refugee camp. As was the case with most refugees, Abu Al-Abd is unable to secure a job. Him and the other residents of the camp wait every month for donations from international associations. As a way to escape the camp, Abu Al-Abd digs a trench that also enables Abu Samir to enter the camp. Abu Samir is also a refugee, albeit in a much better state than Abu Al-Abd, thanks to his position as an employee in a refugee relief agency. Despite that, Abu Samir steals flour from the donations with the help of an American employee, delaying the donations for the rest of the people in the camp by ten days. When he runs into Abu Al-Abd outside the camp one day, he is afraid that his secret will be found out, so he offers Abu Al-Abd a deal to become a part of game in exchange for money. Abu Al-Abd is in a hard position; on the one hand, getting the money would mean he is able to buy his son a new shirt. On the other hand. it would mean the continuation of the delay that the camp residents go through every month.

The stolen shirt and the stolen flour are both symbols that Kanafani uses to refer to the events of the Nakba and discuss the Palestinian Cause. In addition to the political discourse that the story unravels, it also addresses the issue of moral principles and the repercussions of lack thereof. The time period that the story was written in, 1958, is significant to understanding the message that it is trying to get across, which is a warning to all Palestinians against the further stealing of their land, and ways they could be used to enable the stealing.

== Other Works By Ghassan Kanafani ==
- ard al-burtuqal al-hazin, 1963 (أرض البرتقال الحزين, The Land of Sad Oranges)
- rijal fi ash-shams, 1963 (رجال في الشمس, Men in the Sun)
- al-bab, 1964 (الباب, The Door)
- 'aalam laysa lana, 1965 (عالمٌ ليس لنا, A World Not Our Own)
- 'adab al-muqawamah fi filastin al-muhtalla 1948–1966, 1966 (أدب المقاومة في فلسطين المحتلة 1948–1966, Literature of Resistance in Occupied Palestine)
- ma tabaqqa lakum, 1966 (ما تبقّى لكم, All That's Left to You)
- fi al-adab al-sahyuni, 1967 (في الأدب الصهيوني, On Zionist Literature)
- al-adab al-filastini al-muqawim that al-ihtilal: 1948–1968, 1968 (الأدب الفلسطيني المقاوم تحت الاحتلال 1948–1968, Palestinian Resistance Literature under the Occupation 1948–1968)
- 'an ar-rijal wa-l-banadiq, 1968 (عن الرجال والبنادق, On Men and Rifles)
- umm sa'd, 1969 (أم سعد, Umm Sa'd)
- a'id ila Hayfa, 1970 (عائد إلى حيفا, Return to Haifa)
- al-a'ma wa-al-atrash, 1972 (الأعمى والأطرش, The Blind and the Deaf)
- Barquq Naysan, 1972 (برقوق نيسان, The Apricots of April)
- al-qubba'ah wa-l-nabi, 1973 (القبعة والنبي, The Hat and the Prophet) incomplete
- thawra 1936-39 fi filastin, 1974 (ثورة 1936-39 في فلسطين, The Revolution of 1936–39 in Palestine)
- jisr ila-al-abad, 1978 (جسر إلى الأبد, A Bridge to Eternity)
- al-qamis al-masruq wa-qisas ukhra, 1982 (القميص المسروق وقصص أخرى, The Stolen Shirt and Other Stories)
- 'The Slave Fort' in Arabic Short Stories, 1983 (transl. by Denys Johnson-Davies)
- faris faris, 1996 (فارس فارس, Knight Knight)
