= The Survivor (1996 film) =

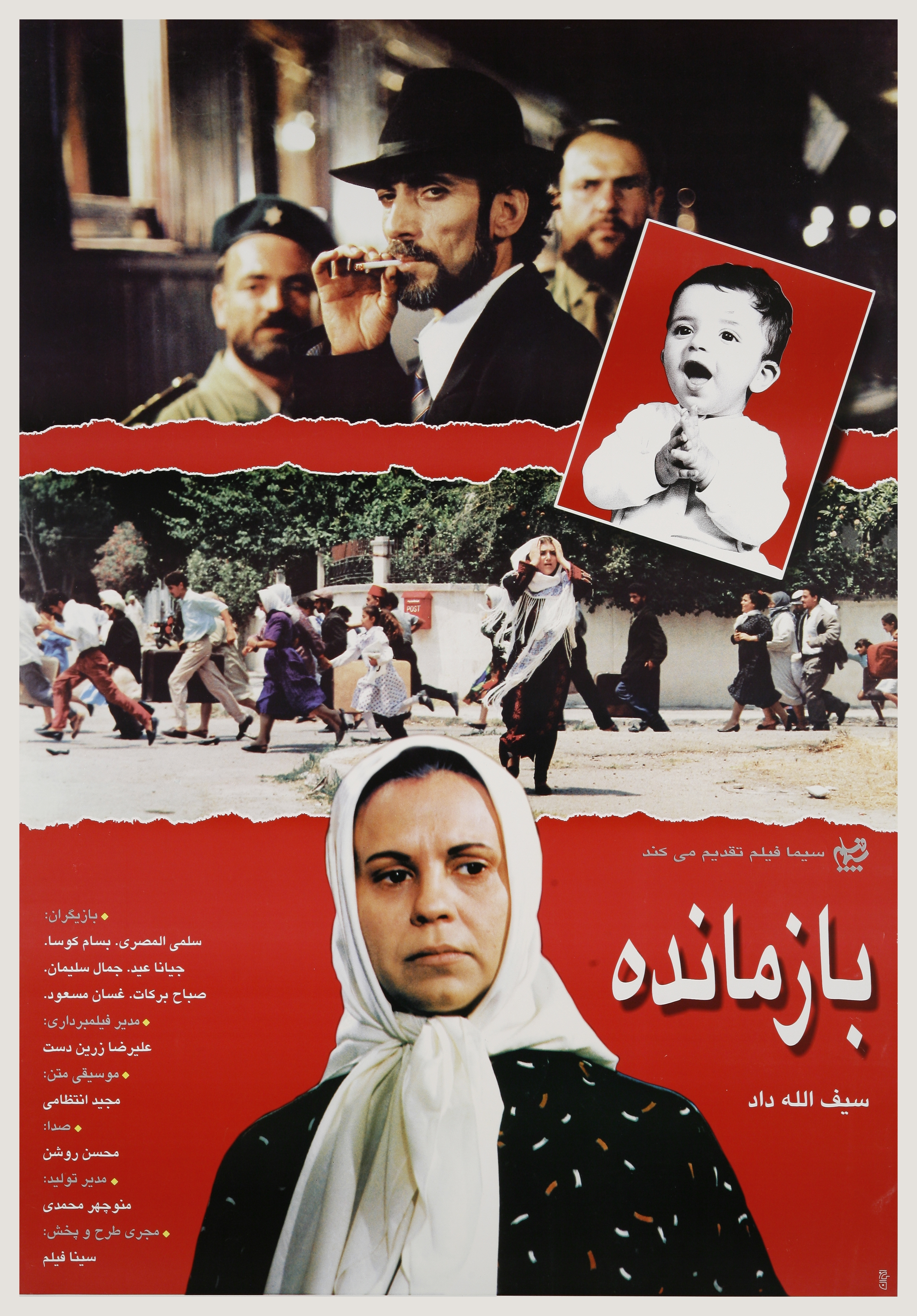
- Directed by: Seifollah Dad
- Screenplay by: Seifollah Dad
- Based on: Returning to Haifa by Ghassan Kanafani
- Produced by: Manochehr Mohammadi; Seifollah Dad
- Starring: Salma Al-Masri; Alaa El Din Koksh; Ghassan Massoud; Jamal Suleiman
- Music by: Majid Entezami
- Release date: February 1996
- Running time: 144 minutes
- Countries: Iran; Syria
- Language: Arabic

The Survivor is a 1996 Iranian epic historical drama film about Arab–Israeli conflict starring Salma Al-Masri, Alaa El Din Koksh, Ghassan Massoud, and Jamal Suleiman. The script is based on Returning to Haifa, a novel by the Palestinian author Ghassan Kanafani in 1969. The novel is about Israeli Declaration of Independence and its government in Haifa in 1948.

== Plot ==
Dr Saeid, his wife (Latifeh), and their infant (Farhan) were living in Haifa during Independence of Israel in 1948. Dr Saeid saw Shamoon, his Jewish childhood neighbor and playmate, while Shamoon tried to bomb in a train and he informed police about incidence. Shamoon who empowered in Haifa decided to revenge on Dr Saeid by trying to make him to leave the city (as depicted in film, like many other Arab community who left the city obligatory). Dr Saeid’s defied Shamoon but his Mother (Safieh) came to Haifa to persuade him to leave the city. Lastly, Dr Saeid persuaded to leave the city with his family, but at their last day in Haifa, Israeli forces invade the city and Dr saeid and his wife were killed. Farhan, who was the only survivor, remained alone in their home for three days. A Jewish family settled in their home and undertook Farhan’s guardian. Safieh entered to the house as the nanny to release survivor from the Jewish family. Although she did not deny her descent, She used a fake identity and denounced Farhan's parents to leave him alone in the home and evade for their life. Safieh’s husband who was involving armed fight against Israeli forces, planned to bomb in a train carried mostly Jewish people and troops. Safieh consented to help them by carrying the luggage containing bombs in board. Shamoon, Farhan and his Jewish guardians were among passengers. As soon as Safieh real identity revealed, Safieh leaped from train to ground. Although she injured critically the survivor remained healthy. At last scene, explosion Flash was visible while Safieh whispered Quran and hugged the survivor.

== Cast ==
- Salma Al-Masri as Safiyeh a grandmother and school principal
- Alaa El Din Koksh as Rashid
- Ghassan Massoud as Shamoon
- Jamal Suleiman as Dr Saeid an Arab physician
