= Fouad Awad =

Israeli-Palestinian theatre director

- فؤاد عوض
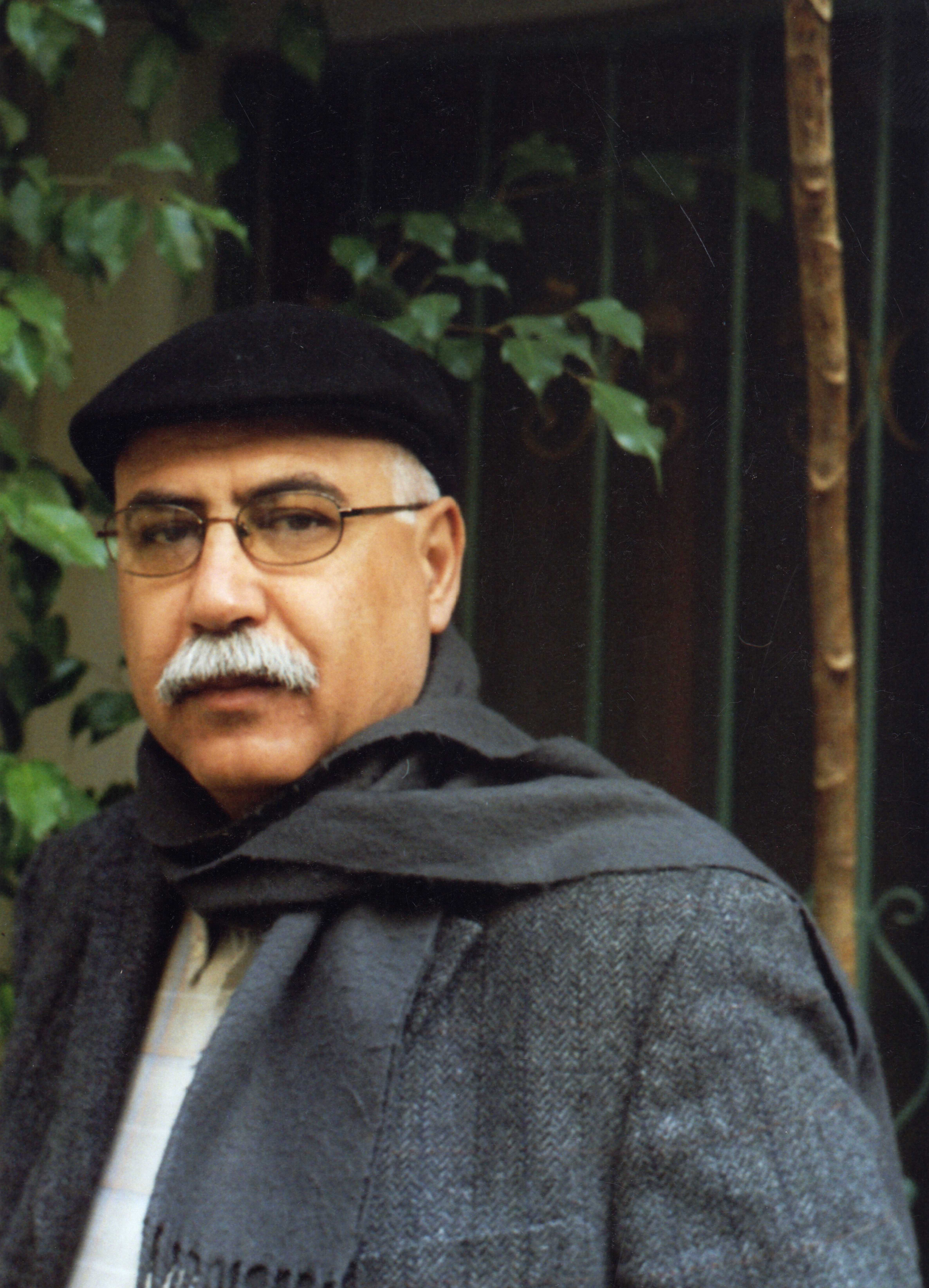
- Born: Fouad Awad; October 7, 1956 (age 69); Nazareth, Israel
- Years active: 1979–present

Fouad Awad (Hebrew: פואד עווד, Arabic: فؤاد عوض; born October 7, 1956) is an avant-garde Israeli-Palestinian theatre director, and a prominent figure in the Palestinian theatrical movement.

== Biography ==
Awad was born on October 7, 1956, in Nazareth to Palestinian parents. He attended Nazareth Baptist School, where he, for the first time, experienced theatre by participating in school performances. In 1979, he made his directorial debut with the production "The King is The King" (based on a novel by the late Syrian playwright Saad Alla Wannous). He earned his Bachelor of Fine Arts degree from Tel Aviv University in 1982. While at Tel Aviv University, he directed "Miss Julie" written by August Strindberg and "Men in the Sun" written by the Palestinian writer, Ghassan Kanafani. "Men in the Sun" deals with the journey of four Palestinians seeking to travel to Kuwait in a hope of finding a job there during the oil boom. They went through a checkpoint after another, driven by the elusive dream of better future, only to be found dead upon reaching Kuwait. From 1983 until 1987, He worked at the Municipal Cultural Centre in Nazareth. While working at the Cultural Centre, he directed several plays, including, "The Dervishes are Looking for the Truth" written by the Syrian writer, Mustafa Al Hallaj as well as "Ashater Hasan" based on the folktale known by the same title.

In 1986, he directed "A Song of a Deformed Soldier" which constituted a turning point in the theatrical production, combining sundry forms of theatrical art such puppets and masks. The play dealt with the compulsory military service amongst the Druze community. In 1987 he directed Birds, a play written by Ibrahim Khalaileh which deals with the Palestinian desire to break free from the Israeli occupation. The play was well received in many European countries. In 1989, Awad received "Best Theatre Director" award as well as "Best Theatrical Work" award for the play "Jaber's Head" from Acre Theatre Festival. In 1991 along with his long-time mate, Mohammed Aoudtalla, he established Alsadaka Cultural Centre. In 1992 he directed The Alley in collaboration with Samia Kazmouz Bakri, which deals with the expatriation of Palestinians and the memories of one's home and city; places undergoing demographic changes. In 1993 he directed "The Night and The Mountain" written by Abed Alghaffar Makawi and produced in the Hebrew language. "The Night and The Mountain"- a Yemeni legend dealing with the fear caused by occupation- was a production of "Hakhan Hayerushalme" Theatre in Jerusalem. In 1994, he and his colleague, Eran Bene'el, directed "Romeo and Juliet" by William Shakespeare, a play that opened Lille Festival in France. It was a collaborative production between Al Kasaba Theatre in Ramallah and Al Khan Theatre in Jerusalem. The play was considered a huge success and received international acclaim. In 1995, "The Night and The Mountain" was remade, for Alkasaba theatre. From late 1995 and until 1/4/1998 he worked as the manager of Nazareth Contemporary Cultural Centre, a centre that was a product of a self initiative. During that time, the centre hosted numerous art galleries, folklore dance groups, seminars, and movies. In 1998, he directed a play by the name "Le Montrer" for Almidan Theatre. The play – which is about the humanization and rebellion of an artist's marionettes and their attempt to poison him - was written by Andrée Chedid.

Starting from mid-1998 and until late 2002 he worked as the artistic manager of Almidan Theatre. And during that time, numerous productions were made, such as "Suhmata", "Edrab Maftouh", "Abeir File No.96/63", "Jazerat Al Ma'az", "Athkur" (a Musical), "Bayt Assayida", and "Zaghroudat Al Ard". In 1999 he directed "Abeir File No.96/63", a play based on the novel "The Collector" by the British author John Fowles. The play portrays the Israeli-Palestinian conflict; a settler kidnaps a Palestinian artist and holds her in a public bunker, with the claim that he wants to live with her in peace, which is impossible. The play harvested success and recognition due to the boldness in which the play addresses the Israeli occupation of Palestine. The play can be described in terms of production as confluence of cinema and theatre, where a cinematic footage is embedded in a theatrical production. In late 2002 he finished his term as a manager of Almidan Theatre, marking 5 years of success and achievements that catapulted the theatre to prominence and consequentially becoming a leading theatre serving as the national theatre for the Palestinian minority in Israel. In 2003 he directed "The Bus", a play portraying the post-intifada relations between Palestinians and Israelis and the Israeli perspective towards Palestinians in the light of suicide bombings that emanated at that time. Awad participated it numerous theatrical conferences and festivals in Europe and the Arab world, and was a guest lecturer in some of them, including Berlin Festival, Carthage Festival and Avignon, where he shared his experience and talked about the Palestinian theatre. He served as an artistic consultant in the Israel Film Fund. He served as a member of the artistic committee of Acre (Akko) Theatre Festival for a year. 2004-2007 He was the general manager of Almidan Theatre. At that time, the theatre was going through hardship. Therefore, upon becoming manager, he had to reestablish the theatre's former stature. He increased the number of productions per year, and managed to revive the theatre. During this period, he established the Almidan Theatre Festival. He finished writing his autobiography "Law Kont..." (If You Were...) which was written by the author and journalist Naji Daher.

In 2008 he started to work as the manager of the Cultural Department in Nazareth Municipality. During that time, he established Nazareth International Children's Theatre Festival.

He participated in the 24th ACCO, and Theatre in a Multicultural Society Jerusalem Conference, 7–9 January 2008.

He's considered a leading theatre director since he had a leading role in shaping the Palestinian theatrical movement in Israel; Awad was the first to bring a cinematic approach to theatre, embedding a cinematic footage in a theatrical production.

Currently, he teaches theatre at the Drama Academy in Ramallah and works as the head of the Cultural Department in Nazareth.

== Work ==
Stage Productions

- The King is The King (1979)
- Men In The Sun (1982)
- Miss Julia (1982)
- The Dervishes are looking for the Truth (1985)
- A Song of a Deformed Soldier (1986)
- Birds (1987)
- Jaber's Head (1989)
- The Alley (1992)
- The Night and The Mountain (1993)
- Romeo And Juliet (1994)
- Le Montrer (1998)
- Abeer File No.96/63 (1999)
- The Bus (2003)
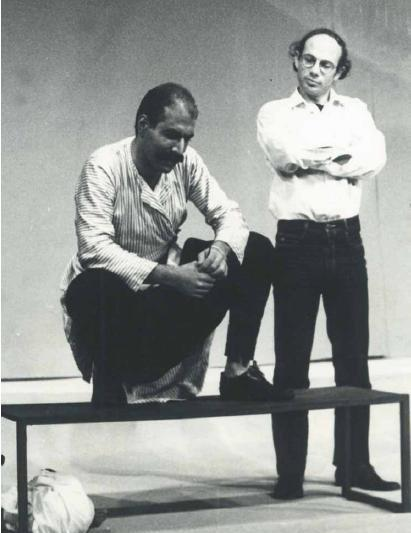
Men In The Sun, 1982

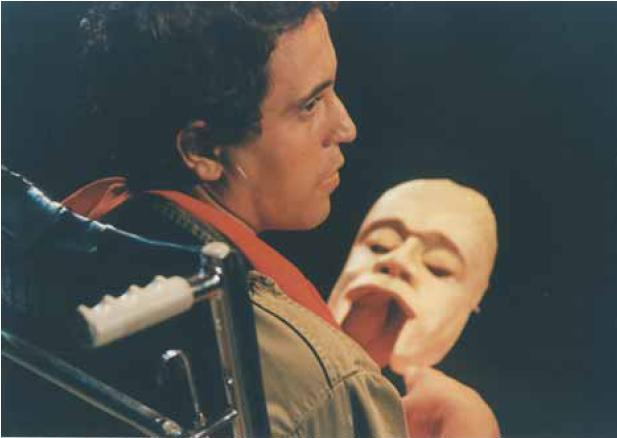
A Song of a Deformed Soldier, 1986

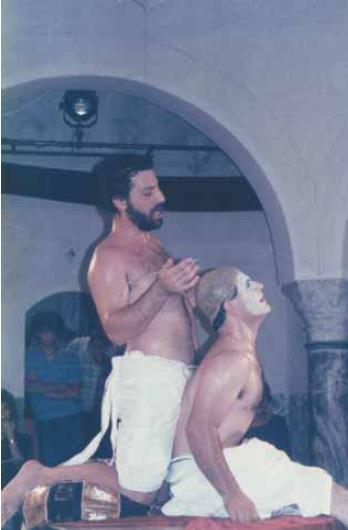
Jaber's Head, 1989

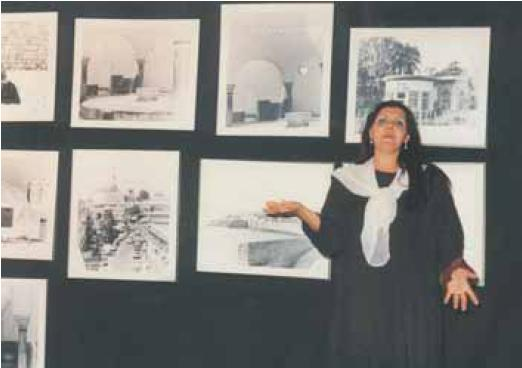
The Alley, 1992

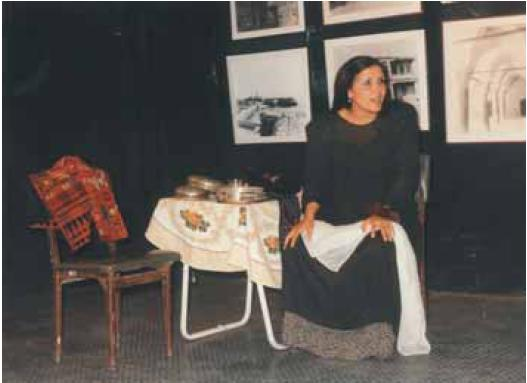
The Alley, 1992

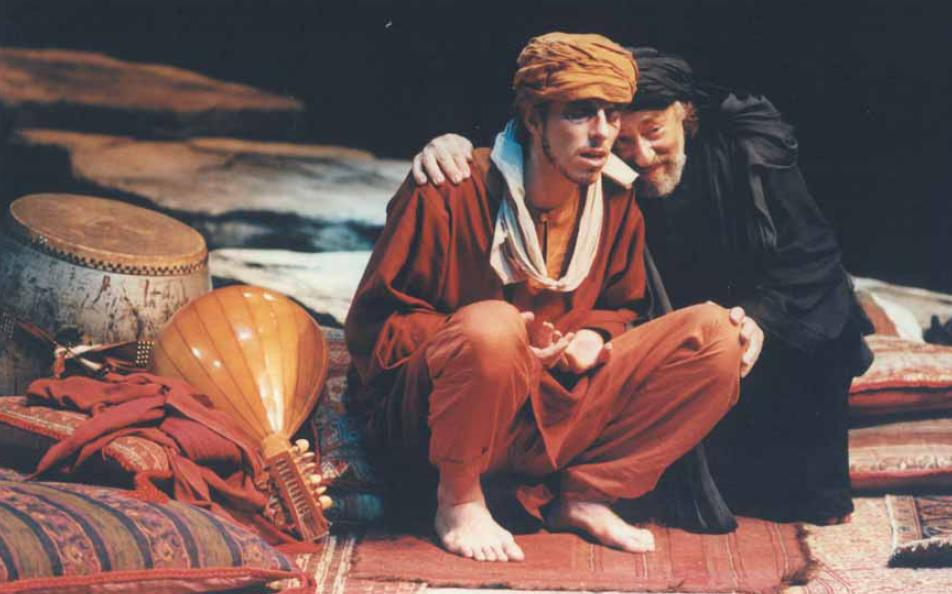
The Night and The Mountain (Hebrew), 1993

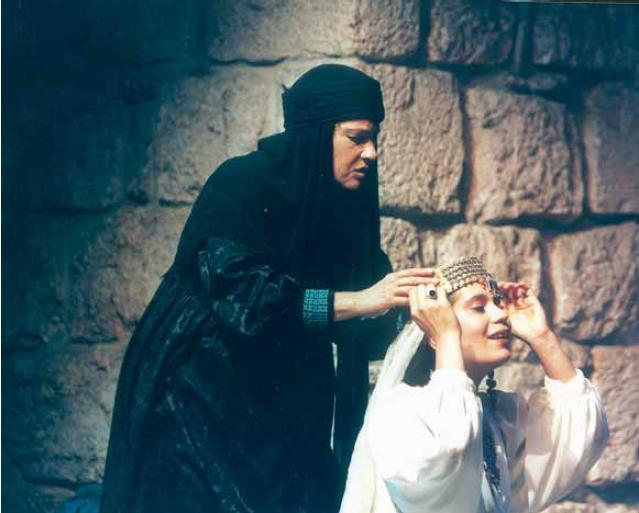
The Night and The Mountain (Hebrew), 1993

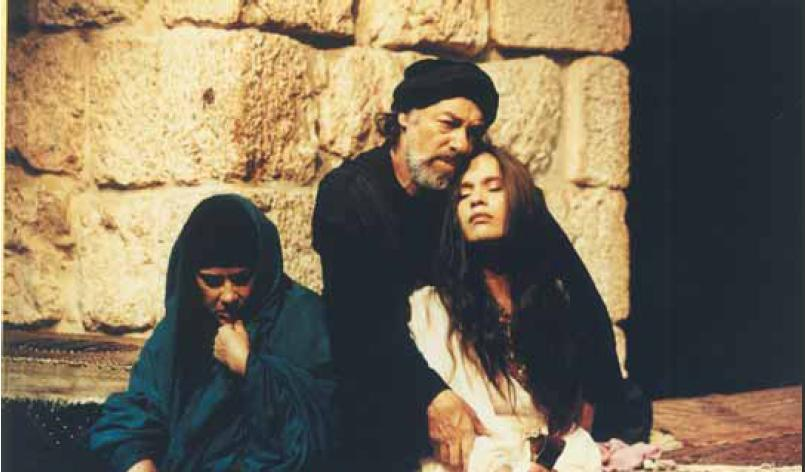
The Night and The Mountain (Hebrew), 1993

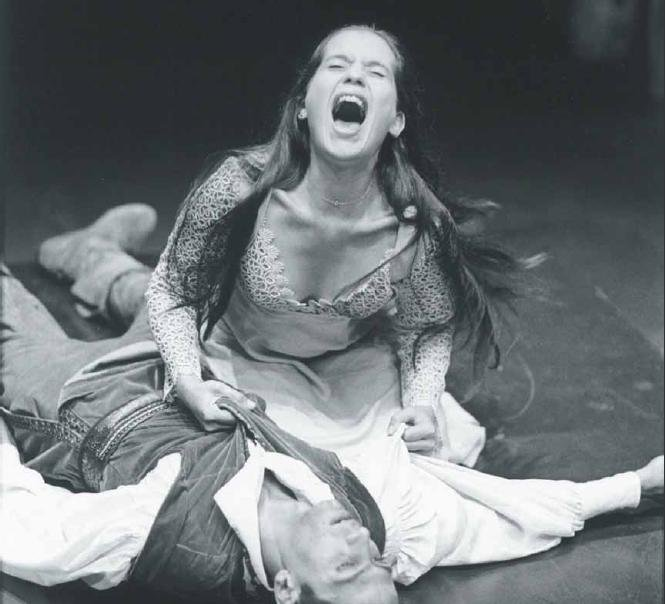
Romeo and Juliet, 1994

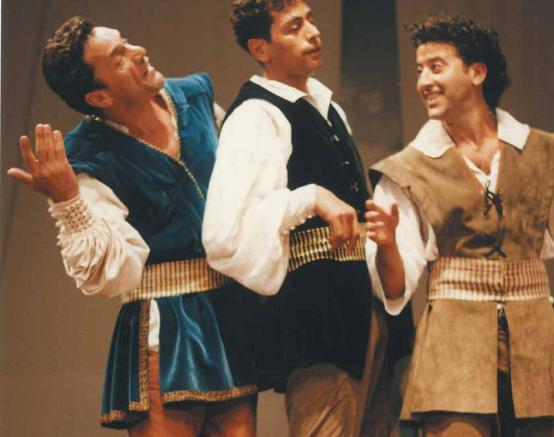
Romeo and Juliet, 1994

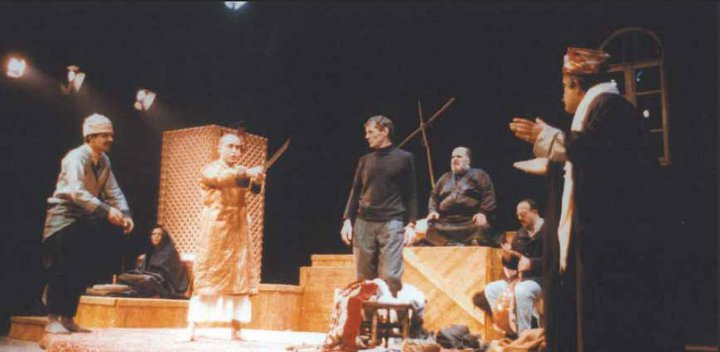
The Night and The Mountain (Arabic), 1995

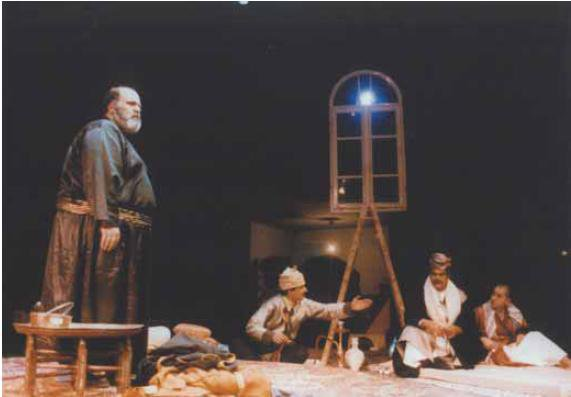
The Night and The Mountain (Arabic), 1995

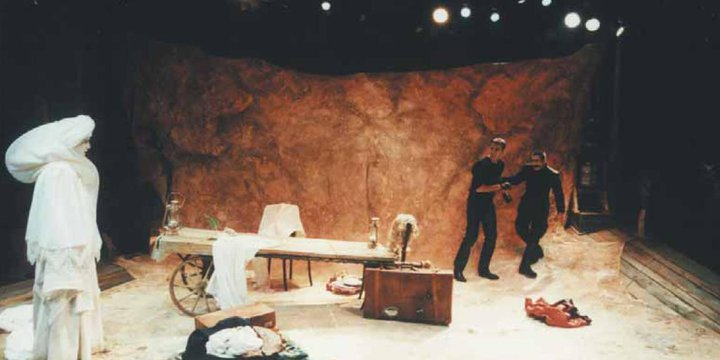
Le Montrer, 1998

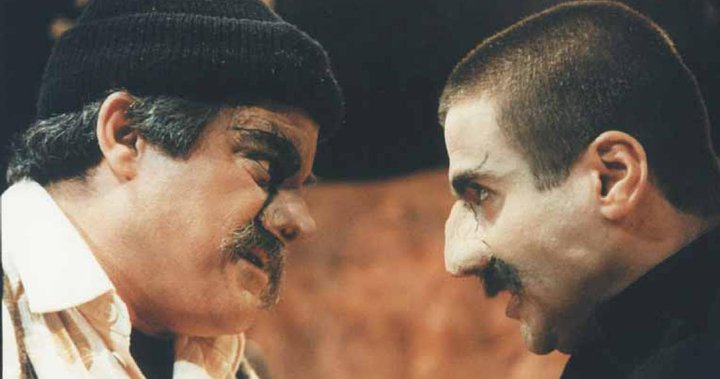
Le Montrer, 1998

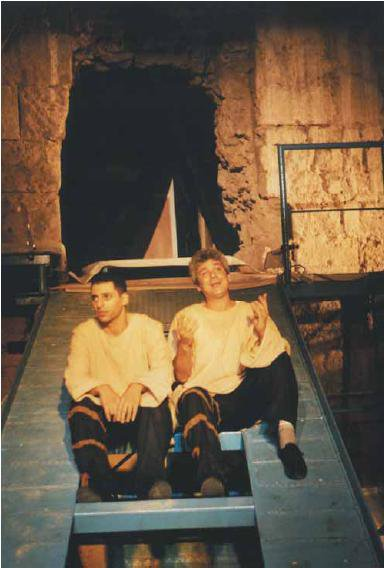
The Bus, 2003

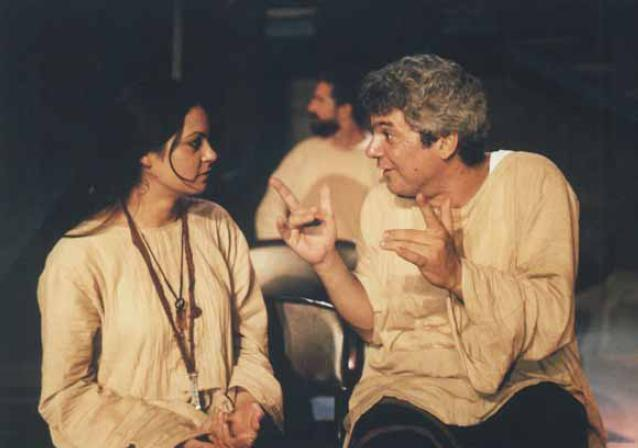
The Bus, 2003

== Awards ==
Best Director - Acco Theatre Festival 1989
