= Jaras =

Jaras may refer to:

- Járás, a type of administrative subdivision of Hungary equivalent to district
- Jaras TV, Al Jaras TV, a TV station of Lebanon
- Al Jaras, a magazine, Lebanon
- Jerash, Jaras was an old name for this Jordanian city
- Evaldas Jaras, Lithuanian stage and TV actor and stage director
