= The Hat and the Prophet =

1967 play

- Author: Ghassan Kanafani
- Language: Arabic
- Genre: Play
- Publisher: Rimal Publications
- Publication date: 2013 (Originally 1973)
- Publication place: Cyprus (Originally in Palestine)
- Pages: 95

The Hat and the Prophet is a play written by Palestinian fiction writer and journalist, Ghassan Kanafani. Although Kanafani completed the play in 1967, it was only published in 1973, nine months after Kanafani's assassination.

Although much of Kanafani's literature was explicitly political, this play was influenced by modernism and existentialism. Hadeel Aldegheishem argues that Kanafani's play discusses existentialist philosophy, and points out the different implications of this philosophy in both the Arab and Western worlds.

== Characters ==
- "The Accused," who is charged with killing an extraterrestrial being known as "the Thing"
- Judges known as "Number 1" and "Number 2," who are overseeing the case against "the Accused"
- "The Lady," a lover of the accused who is pregnant with his child
- "The Mother," the mother of the Lady
- "The Postman," who suffers from excessive curiosity
- "The Thing," an extraterrestrial being that doesn't resemble any living thing. Kanafani describes it as being black and resembling fabric or rubber. Although the Thing can speak, it cannot feel pain, and only needs water to survive.
- "The Policeman"

== Synopsis and scene 1 ==
The play consists of three scenes of Numbers 1 and 2 conducting a trial against "The Guilty", accusing him of killing "The Thing", along with encountering "The Thing" and uncovering his secrets, and dealing with "The Lady". Within the three scenes, questions of existence, innocence, and guilt would hover upon; unsuccessful relationships due to hierarchy, the question of love, and fear of every bit of life, leading to uncovering a gap between two opposite worlds.

Accused of hurting "The Thing", "The Guilty" tries to direct things around with these questions of innocence and guilt, with the police directing light around both in hopes of revealing "the real guilty". He claims that its the idea of fearing Strangers planted by the community, that caused the excessive reaction (considering that "The Thing" was peculiar to him when it first landed in his place). As a comeback, Numbers 1 and 2 would consider enviness, hatred, and the past, filled with his relationship problems with the "Lady", and endless phobias, as factors leading to crime.

Forming a relationship with "The Thing", a gap is uncovered. It doesn't know pain, "the way to pleasure", as "The Guilty" would describe it. It doesn't know feelings of loss. It barely even knows the other gender; hence lacking love, and lacking "the undescribable feeling of it, the hidden happiness and craveness upon it" as "The Guilty would describe it. Lacking "the warmth of the sun, and covered by rain". Accusing him again of "killing The Thing with a new technique of throwing harsh words", Numbers 1 and 2 point out the contradiction upon "The Guilty", saying that he barely even knows love, himself, and barely has electricity to talk about the beauty of sunlight.

The relationship embarks on a different dimension of knowing oneself through a different world. "The Lady" trying to lure her love into taking a new direction of better marriage and life, asks him to sell "The Thing" which she and her mother tended to encounter due to his "effortless attempt of being funny" while all on stage, as laboratories were eager to uncover "this big secret" of "The Thing", and the millions of dollars was going to fix his relationship with "The Lady's" mother.

However, things were much more deeper to him than what everyone else thought. "The Thing" was the one to be showing him the real world. Getting into the moment with it, from sunrises to going to the beach, felt different, as he'd claim. Angry at "The Lady's" way of thinking on top of everything else already, he kicks her out.

=== Scene 2 ===
In scene 2, contradictions within human nature were the new question. Being stuck between two different worlds. Is he a man? Or a thing? Or both? "The Thing" was making him feel like a prophet. It's like he was figuring out a new world, "similar to a child figuring out his fingers" (48), as he described. Arguments spark as "The Thing" teases him about not being logical enough, and that "his prophecy" barely reached one person. While "The Guilty" points out to the fact that "The Thing" had zero feelings towards its lost "Hat" friend, and that it is probably causing the same drama of being a different creature somewhere else, making it of high importance, probably prophet. Degrading the importance of it, "The Thing" finds no difference between a hat and a prophet.

"The Lady" and her mother come back with someone from the laboratory who wanted to buy "The Thing". It turns out the mother was wearing the "special hat". "The Guilty" feels that "The Hat" is "The Thing's" friend. He tries all lies and ways to get her to sell it to him, but she only agrees with a difficult deal, or barely not at all. Numbers 1 and 2 then show up, accusing him again of stealing and cheating, especially after hearing his plans with the thing in merging their two worlds together.

The Guilty said he only wanted to find prophets, and at the same time make sure the lady wears the perfect safe hat. His argument was sort of convincing and confusing to Numbers 1 and 2. Explaining to them differences and importance within the two objects of hats and prophets, Numbers 1 and 2 don't get a thing, making "The Guilty" feel angry because they do not realise the difference between the expensive and cheap, leading to a realisation that people don't wanna leave their comfort zone which is why they discuss hats instead of prophets.

=== Scene 3 ===
In scene 3, re loops of scenes 1 and 2 of accusations, aggressiveness, and fights from Numbers 1 and 2, "The Lady", and her mother hurt his head. He was reading plenty of mail, replying excessively through the telegraph, while "The Thing" shouts out what's inside from requests of buying him that came from everywhere; universities, factories, organisations. He got too busy at some point, that "The Thing" died out of thirst. Numbers 1 and 2 appear, preparing the death penalty. "The Guilty" claims that he is from space, and wasn't anything. Was he prophet? Dream? Message? Unknown.

Things then escalate when he accuses everyone on Earth to be at fault. Due to confusion and lack of evidence, Numbers 1 and 2 declare him innocent, but "The Guilty" calls them cruel, and they insisted that they tried their best in arresting him. The play ends with a voice scolding "The Guilty" for letting "The Thing" die, but it starts moving again, making them reunite and go off together.

== Quotes ==
"Is there anything more terrifying in the life of a man who hid love in his pocket as a last weapon to defend himself?"

"If an idea is born, it is not possible to get rid of it. You can only betray it."

"Love alone cannot, no matter how hot, bake a loaf."

== See also ==
- A Death in Bed No. 12
- The Sad Orange Land
