= Sayed al-Bolti =

- السيد البلطي
- Directed by: Tewfik Saleh
- Written by: Tewfik Saleh; Saleh Morsi
- Starring: Ezzat El Alaili; Mohammad Nouh; Abdel Rahman Abou Zahra; Soheir El-Morshidy; Madiha Hamdi; Nahed Samir; Shafik Nour El Din; Tawfiq al-Daqan; Abdel Azim Abdel Haq; Ibrahim Emara
- Cinematography: Wadid Sirry
- Edited by: Jamil Abdulaziz; Marcel Saleh
- Music by: Fouad el-Zahiri; Abdel Azim Abdel Haq
- Production companies: Mohamed Abdel Gawad Cinema Foundation; Abdul Masih
- Release date: August 18, 1969
- Running time: 115
- Country: Egypt
- Language: Arabic

Sayed al-Bolti (Arabic: السيد البلطي) is an Egyptian film released in 1969 directed by Tewfik Saleh, who was also the co-writer along with Saleh Morsi's contribution to the screenplay and dialogue. The film was based on Morsi's novel زقاق السيد البلطي (“Sayed al-Balti’s Alley”), starring Ezzat El Alaili and Soheir El-Morshidy, and produced by the General Egyptian Film Organization. The events in the film take place in the 1930s in a primitive fishing village where a rich resident's motorboat threatens the villagers’ livelihoods, including that of the titular Bolti family (البلطي, transliterated as such or as Balti or Balty or Bolty, means “tilapia” in Arabic).

== Plot ==
Events begin in the home of a fisherman named Sayed al-Bolti while he is out to sea. Mahmoud al-Bolti (Mohammad Nouh) runs away in protest of his lot in life, chased by Hanafi al-Bolti (Ezzat El Alaili) and Mahmoud's father Muhammad al-Bolti (Ibrahim Emara. Hanafi's mother (Nahed Samir) watches from outside the house and asks “Where are you, Sayed al-Bolti.” Hanafi, Sayed's son, calls out the words on his mind to his absent father: “What is your task, Sayed? The sun has set, and time has risen like a faithful dog.” Rumors circulate that Sayed al-Bolti has been seduced and captured by mermaids. His colleagues gather to squabble over shares between themselves and with the owner of the charter boats, Moallem Abdel-Mawgoud (Tawfiq al-Daqan), who the small-time fishermen accuse of destroying their livelihoods by accepting an offer to join a large foreign fishing trawler’s crew. In a night bar serving the ancient fermented wheat beer known as “bouza,” is visiting with his beloved dancer Kaydahm (Fatma Ali) and his owner and singing duet partner Ibrahim Juma (Abdel Azim Abdel Haq). Meanwhile, the elderly Hamouda al-Bolti (Shafik Nour El Din) is treating his asthma with a doctor named Sayed Effendi (Abdel Rahman Abou Zahra), who is in love with Hanafi’s beautiful sister Aisha (Madiha Hamdi) and is only stopped from marrying her by her family’s hostility. Finally, Hanafi falls in love with Zoba (Soheir El-Morshidy), Hamouda’s eldest daughter.

The conflict between the old and new ways simmers as the fishermen are torn between the hope of Sayed al-Bolti’s return on his dhow and Mahmoud’s invitation to join Abdel-Mawgoud on the trawler. In the final scene, Mahmoud lies on the deck and fields the following complaint from one of the die-hard mourners of Sayed: “I am afraid, Mahmoud, that you are dreaming and only think of dreams.” Mahmoud retorts that “all the sweet things in the world were once dreams. Nobody imagines a need unless he can achieve it given the faith, determination, and patience necessary. With lifelong perseverance, one’s greatest dreams are within reach.”

== Cast ==
- Ezzat El Alaili (Hanafi ibn Sayed al-Bolti)
- Soheir El-Morshidy (Zoba bint Hamouda al-Bolti)
- Mohammad Nouh (Mahmoud ibn Muhammad al-Bolti)
- Madiha Hamdi (Aisha bint Sayed al-Bolti, Hanafi's sister)
- Tawfiq al-Daqan (Moallem Abdel-Mawgoud)
- Abdel Rahman Abou Zahra (Sayed Effendi, a doctor)
- Abdul-Badi Al-Arabi (Sayed al-Balti)
- Nahed Samir (Hanafi al-Bolti's mother)
- Ibrahim Emara (Muhammad al-Balti, Mahmoud's father)
- Abdel Azim Abdel Haq (Ibrahim Juma, owner of the tavern)
- Fatma Ali (Kaydahm)
- Shafik Nour El Din (Hamouda al-Bolti)
- Motawia Owaise (Salma al-Sayyad)
- Fattheia Aly (maid)
- Toson Moatamed (hunter)
- Leonie Lyon (yacht owner)

== Production and reception ==
Three films directed by Tawfiq Saleh were shown in Egypt in 1968 and 1969, including The Rebels and Diary of a Country Prosecutor. All three take place under the monarchy, but Sayed al-Bolti fits squarely into the context of Egypt's defeat in the Six-Day War in 1967. Saleh directed the film only three months after June 1967, but release was postponed by censors until 1969, ostensibly over a mourning tone deemed too sensitive for the moment. The most salient scenes feature Hanafi's mother saying “none of this would have happened if he was present; where are you now, Sayed?” while he looks seaward and utters “What do I do now, Sayed, show me the way as your son, father?” This soliloquy is interrupted by a shot of a sand castle on the shore being washed away in the tide, marking Hanafi's symbolic love of the past and fantasy vis-à-vis Mahmoud's escape from father and family into the “wide world” as he puts it, ergo the future and a rapidly changing reality.

The film criticism website Bidayyat writes that “Saleh shot the film in September 1967, that is, three months after the Six-Day War.” The presumptive disappearance of Sayed al-Balti leaves him a fallen legend, and Hanafi seeks the mirage for his guidance in filling his father's shoes since “the burden is heavy.”

In an article in the newspaper Asharq Al-Awsat, the following is written in summary:

It is an important film, not necessarily for any political perspective but for the unflinching depiction of the peasant class and its concerns. Every social nuance of the interactions, small and large, is captured by cinematographer Wadid Sirry’s use of natural lighting [as opposed to the spotlights and Hollywood techniques used in mainstream Egyptian cinema of the time].

== Censorship ==
After coming back from a visit to his grieving mother-in-law in Jordan, Tawfiq Saleh returned to find many scenes removed by the censors. According to his fellow director Hashem El-Nahas:

The premiere was before he returned and was a fiasco. I almost cried in anger, and the end result was something Saleh himself would find incomprehensible.

Saleh reported later that he withdrew it from some early showings when censors called it “degenerate” for actress Soheir El-Morshidy to shave up to the knee.
