= Khairiya Al Mansour =

Iraqi filmmaker and director (born 1958)

Khairiya Al Mansour is an Iraqi filmmaker and director. Born March 28, 1958, in Baghdad, Khairiya studied there from 1976 to 1980 at the Academy of Arts, and in Cairo at the Higher Film Institute in 1987. She is the first Iraqi woman who worked as a cinema director. She was an assistant director to well-known Iraqi and Egyptian directors such as Salah Abu Seif, Tewfik Saleh, and Youssef Chahine. She herself has made around forty documentary films for the Iraqi ministry of culture and for private producers. She has also directed two full-length films. When the international embargo against Iraq brought about the collapse of the film industry there, she started working for Iraqi and Jordanian television. She divides her time between Baghdad and Cairo.

Khairiya Al Mansour's films can generally be divided into two categories. Her socially critical films tackle issues such as the situation of women of Iraq: This is My Village (about peasant women), Determination, and The Lady of Ages (about the founding of the Iraqi Women's Association). Or they deal with the impact of the international embargo, especially on Iraq's children: Look! and White Dreams (about a milk factory that was destroyed) and One Day in Baghdad.

Khairiya's other area of film is artist's portraits: Magical Fingers (about women painters), Cinema Lover (about a deceased director), and The Dream, The Memory (about a famous actor who died during the embargo).

== Returning to Iraq to direct documentaries ==
- This Is My Village / C’est mon village (1981, 15', 35mm)
- Basma (1981, 10', 16mm)
- Determination (1983, 12', 35mm)
- three 15-minute documentaries about the Nairobi World Conference on Women (1983)
- The Daughter of Mesopotamia (1984)
- The Student and the Battle (1986, 30', 35mm)
- The Churches of Iraq (1988, 30', 35mm)
- The Wells of Iraq (1988, 30', 35mm)
- Magical Fingers (1989, 15', 35mm)
- The Lady of Ages (1990, 30', 35mm)
- Look! (1991, 30', 35mm)
- White Dreams (1991, 30', 35mm)
- The Call of Iraq (1991, 30', 35mm)
- The Builders (1996, 30', 35mm)
- Cinema Lover (1997, 10', 35mm)
- The Dream, The Memory (1998, 15', 35mm)
- One Day in Baghdad (1998, 15', 35mm)
- The Memory of An Eye (1999, 15', 35mm)
- Adoration and Creativity (2000, 30', 35mm)
- Angels Do Not Die (2000, 22', 35mm)
- The Last Painting (2000, 7', 35mm)

== Feature films ==
- 20/20 Vision / Sitta ‘ala sitta (1988, 90', 35mm)
- 100 Percent / Miya ‘ala miya (1992, 105', 35mm)
