= Pierre Sadek =

Lebanese artist

- Born: 1938; Zahlé
- Died: 24 April 2013 (aged 74–75); Beirut
- Education: Lebanese Academy of Fine Arts
- Occupation: Caricaturist
- Website: pierresadekfoundation.org

Pierre Sadek (1938 – 24 April 2013) was a Lebanese caricaturist, considered a pioneer of political cartooning and a great defender of freedom of expression.

== Biography ==
Born in Zahlé, he graduated from the Lebanese Academy of Fine Arts and worked for several newspapers, including Al Amal, Al Anwar, An-Nahar, Ad-Diyar, and Assayad magazine where his caricatures of Egyptian President Gamal Abdel Nasser led to his dismissal. He also collaborated with a number of international media, such as Time, France Soir and Washington Post. In 1972 he received two Said Akl Awards. In 1986, he was the first caricaturist in Lebanon to do his drawings on TV as part of the main evening newscast. He organized several exhibitions and is the author of four books.

In 2012 he had to deal with a violent campaign against him because he had published a caricature of Hassan Nasrallah, head of the Shiite group Hezbollah, in the daily newspaper Al Joumhouria. In December the same year, President Michel Suleiman named him Commander of the National Order of the Cedar. He had previously been named Knight of the same order by President Suleiman Frangieh and Officer by both President Elias Hrawi and former Prime Minister Rafic Hariri.

He died at 75 at St. George Hospital in Ashrafieh after a long struggle with cancer on 24 April 2013.

== Politics ==
Sadek was politically right-wing, advocating the traditional idea of Lebanon. Politicians he supported included, Raymond Edde, Camille Chamoun, Bachir Gemayel and Rafik Hariri, among others. He was against and highly critical of factions such as the Pan-Arab Nasserites, the PLO and the Syrian leadership, as well as their Lebanese allies during the civil war (1975–1990). He also criticized the Lebanese authorities, who allied with the Syrian regime to rule Lebanon under what has later become to be known as the "guardianship system". During recent years, however, Sadek focused on Hezbollah, insisting on drawing caricatures of Secretary-General Hassan Nasrallah, despite being threatened on Facebook over it. Nevertheless, his favorite subject in his last years was Hezbollah's ally, Gen. Michel Aoun. Sadek never tired of depicting Aoun as an angry orange, in reference to the logo of Aoun's Free Patriotic Movement.
