= Sonya Beiruty =

Lebanese journalist

- سونيا بيروتي
- Born: Sonia Aoun Beiruti; Beirut, Lebanon
- Citizenship: Lebanese
- Occupations: Writer, journalist

Sonya Aoun Beiruty is a Lebanese journalist and writer who has written for several newspapers and magazines in Lebanon. Her books include The Mills of Sectarianism, about sectarianism as a direct cause of the Lebanese civil war, and the novel The Cords of Air, about the lives of 24 Lebanese women.

== Early life and education ==
Beiruty was born in Achrafieh. Her first marriage, to Bicharah Beiruty, ended in divorce and she later married Ihsan Chatilla.

== Career ==
Beiruty began writing journalism for Assayad magazine. In the 1960s she hosted a Lebanese TV talk show.

She was editor-in-chief of Al-Hasnnaa magazine before returning to Assayad and writing for Al-Anwar newspaper in the 1970s.

In the early 1980s she began working for Fayrouz news magazine.

== Works ==
Her works include:

- The Mills of Sectarianism
- The Cords of Air
- Dates with Yesterday
- The Orbit of the Moment.
