= Bayan Nuwayhed =

Palestinian politician, historian and journalist (1937–2025)

- بيان نويهض
- Born: 1937; Jerusalem, Mandatory Palestine
- Died: 12 July 2025 (aged 87–88); Beirut, Lebanon
- Education: Lebanese University
- Occupations: Politician; Historian
- Spouse: Shafiq al-Hout
- Children: 3
- Relatives: Ajaj Nuwayhed (father)
- Writing career
- Genre: Non-fiction
- Subjects: History; Politics
- Notable works: Sabra and Shatila: September 1982

Bayan Nuwayhed (Arabic: بيان نويهض; 1937 – 12 July 2025) was a Palestinian journalist, academic, historian and a member of the Palestine Liberation Organization (PLO). She was one of the leading historians of Palestine and was the author of the book entitled Sabra and Shatila: September 1982.

== Early life and education ==
Nuwayhed was born in Jerusalem in 1937. Her mother, Jalal Salim, was a poet. Her father, Ajaj Nuwayhed, was a Lebanese-origin Druze and one of the cofounders of the Arab Independence Party. She had three sisters and a brother. They lived in the Upper Baq'a neighbourhood of the city. The family had to leave Jerusalem on 26 April 1948, and she, her mother and her siblings went to Lebanon shortly after the Nakba. Later they settled in Amman, Jordan.

Nuwayhed attended the Schmidt's Girls School in Jerusalem, but she could not complete her education there because of the Israeli occupation of the region in 1948. She graduated from a high school in Amman. She attended the Teachers' Training College for women in Ramallah and graduated in 1956 obtaining a teaching degree. She enrolled in Damascus University, but later attended Lebanese University in Beirut from which she received a degree in political science in 1963. She obtained a master's degree in public law in 1970 and another master's degree in political science in 1971 from Lebanese University. She completed her PhD thesis entitled Political Leaderships and Institutions in Palestine from 1917 to 1948 under the supervision of Anis Sayigh.

== Career and activities ==
Following her graduation from the College Nuwaydeh worked as a teacher in Amman and became a member of the Arab Socialist Baath Party. Later she started her journalistic career writing for a women's magazine entitled Dunya al-Mar'a (Arabic: Women's World). She joined the Beirut based Assayad magazine in 1960 and worked for the title until 1966. During this period she also published articles in the daily newspaper Al Anwar which was a sister publication of Assayad. She continued her political activity for the Arab Socialist Baath Party and headed its Chyah branch in Beirut.

Nuwayhed was one of the first members of the PLO and was part of the General Union of Palestinian Women until 1968. She began to write scripts for the Lebanese radio in 1966. Immediately after the start of the Lebanese Civil War in 1975 she moved to Cairo. She returned to Beirut in 1979 and began to teach at the Faculty of Law and Political Science of the Lebanese University. She retired from her teaching post in 2001 and thereafter carried out studies on the history of Palestine and the Middle East.

== Personal life and death ==
Nuwaydeh married Shafiq al-Hout in Beirut in 1962. She had three children from this marriage: two daughters and a son.

Nuwayhed died in Beirut on 12 July 2025.

=== Work and awards ===
Nuwaydeh published many articles and essays. Her 2018 article documented the biography of six Palestinian public figures, including Walid El Khalidi, Zalikha Al Shihabi, Asma Tubi, Samiha Khalil, Kulthum Odeh and Salma Khadra Jayyusi, with a special reference to the Nakba. She was the author of the following books: Political Leaderships and Institutions in Palestine, 1917-1948 (1981; Arabic); Al Shaikh Al Mujahed Izzeddine Al Qassam in the History of Palestine (1987; Arabic); Palestine: The Question, the People, the Culture: a Political History from the Canaanite Era to the Twentieth Century (1991; Arabic), Sabra and Shatila: September 1982 (2003). and The Diaries of Ajaj Nuwayhed: Sixty Years with the Arab Caravan (1993; Arabic).

Nuwayhed was the recipient of the 2015 Jerusalem Award for Culture and Creativity in the Arab World.
