= The Dupes =

1973 film

The Dupes المخدوعون
- Directed by: Tewfik Saleh
- Written by: Ghassan Kanafani; Tewfik Saleh
- Starring: Mohamed Kheir-Halouani
- Cinematography: Bahgat Heidar
- Release date: July 1973
- Running time: 107 minutes
- Country: Syria
- Language: Arabic

The Dupes (Arabic: المخدوعون, 'al-makhdūʿūn') is a 1973 Syrian drama film directed and co-written by Tewfik Saleh and starring Mohamed Kheir-Halouani, Abderrahman Alrahy, Bassan Lotfi, Saleh Kholoki and Thanaa Debsi. Based on Ghassan Kanafani's 1963 novel, Men in the Sun, the film portrays the lives of three Palestinian refugees after the 1948 Palestinian expulsion and flight by following three generations of men who made their way from Palestine to Iraq in the hope of reaching Kuwait to pursue their dreams of freedom and prosperity. The Dupes received very positive reviews from critics and won multiple awards locally and internationally. It was entered into the 8th Moscow International Film Festival, where it was nominated for the Golden Prize, and the 1972 Carthage Film Festival, where it won the Tanit d'Or.

== Cast ==
- Mohamed Kheir-Halouani as Abou Keïss
- Abderrahman Alrahy as Abou Kheizarane
- Bassan Lofti Abou-Ghazala as Assaad
- Saleh Kholoki as Marouane
- Thanaa Debsi as Om Keïss

== See also ==
- Arab cinema
- Syrian cinema
- List of Syrian films
