= The Other Thing: Who Killed Leila Hayek =

Novel by Ghassan Kanafani

The Other Thing: Who Killed Leila Hayek?
- Author: Ghassan Kanafani
- Language: Arabic
- Genre: Fiction
- Publisher: The Arabic Research Foundation
- Publication date: 1987

The Other Thing: Who Killed Leila Hayek is a novel by the Palestinian writer Ghassan Kanafani. It was published in 1987 by the Arabic Research Foundation. The novel was first published serially in nine parts, starting from 1966, in Al-Hawadith weekly magazine, which was issued in Beirut.

== Plot of The Novel ==
The novel revolves around Mr. Saleh, a successful lawyer. His character opens the novel with a letter from prison to his wife, saying "I did not kill Lelia Hayek." The events then go backwards, leading up to that point. The story begins with Mr. Saleh and his wife going to dinner in a restaurant to celebrate her birthday, followed by going to a nightclub to dance. At the nightclub, Mr. Saleh's wife, Dima, runs into her friend, Leila Hayek, and her husband, Said Hayek. This encounter marks the beginning of an affair between Mr. Saleh and his wife's friend. The events speed up from this point onwards, until they reach the crime and investigation scene.

Kanafani allows the readers to make their own judgment regarding Mr. Saleh's character, presenting them with evidence that, both, prove him guilty and innocent. Despite the difference between this novel and other novels by Kanafani, he still uses it to portray a familiar social reality.
