= Kulthum Odeh =

Palestinian Soviet academic, writer, and translator (1892–1965)

- كلثوم عودة
- Born: 2 April 1892; Nazareth, Ottoman Palestine
- Died: 24 April 1965 (aged 73); Moscow, Russian SFSR, USSR
- Other name: Klavdia Viktorovna Ode-Vasilieva
- Citizenship: Soviet (from 1928)
- Spouse: Ivan Vasiliev (m. 1914; died 1919)
- Children: 3
- Awards: Jerusalem Medal for Culture, Arts and Literature, 1990

Academic background
- Education: Leningrad University

Academic work
- Discipline: Palestine studies; Arab studies
- Institutions: Leningrad University; Institute for International Relations; Higher Diplomatic School

Kulthum Odeh (Note: Odeh's first name is also cited as Kalthoum, and her last name as ‘Awda and 'Odeh.)(Arabic: كلثوم عودة; 2 April 1892 – 24 April 1965), also known as Klavdia Viktorovna Ode-Vasilieva (Russian: Клавдия Викторовна Оде-Васильева), was a Palestinian and Soviet academic, writer, and translator, specialising in Palestinian and Arab studies. Odeh was the first Palestinian and Arab woman to work as a university professor.

== Early life and education ==
Odeh was born on 2 April 1892 in Nazareth, Ottoman Palestine to Nasr Odeh. The youngest of five sisters, Odeh was raised in an Orthodox Christian household. Of her early life, Odeh later wrote:

My arrival to this world was met with tears, for everyone knows how Arabs like ourselves feel when we are told about the birth of a female, especially if this unfortunate girl happens to be the fifth of her sisters, and the family has not been blessed by a boy. Such feelings of hatred accompanied me since an early age.

Although opposed by her mother, Odeh's father sent her to a school run by the Imperial Orthodox Palestine Society (IPPO) in Nazareth. Awarded a scholarship, Odeh continued her education at the Russian Female Teachers' Training College in Beit Jala. Studying at the college from 1900 to 1908, Odeh studied multiple subjects including the Russian language and the history of the Arab world and literature. Among her teachers was Palestinian poet Khalil al-Sakakini, who taught Arabic.

== Career ==
Upon returning to Nazareth, Odeh taught at a IPPO girls primary school and teachers’ seminary and was appointed as an inspector for the Russian schools in Ottoman Palestine. Odeh also began publishing translations of Russian short stories in Arab journals including al-Nafa'is al-‘asriyya, al-Hilal and al-Hasnaa. In 1910, Odeh befriended the Russian Arabist Ignaty Krachkovsky, who became a future colleague and mentor. Odeh meet her future husband Ivan Vasiliev, a Russian doctor working at the IPPO's Sergius Compound, in 1913. (Note: Also cited as 1912.) The couple married a year later at a church in the Russian Compound district of Jerusalem, despite opposition from Odeh's family. (Note: Also cited as 1913.)

Following their marriage, the couple travelled to Russia in order to visit Vasiliev's family in Kronstadt when the World War I broke out. Vasiliev was sent to the Balkan Front, whilst Odeh joined the Red Cross. Completing a nursing course at Kronstadt Naval Hospital, Odeh later worked as a military nurse in Serbia and Montenegro. After the outbreak of the Russian Civil War the couple supported the Bolsheviks, and Vasiliev joined the Red Army. The couple later moved to Ukraine to help combat the typhus epidemic. Vasiliev died in 1919, leaving Odeh widowed with 3 young daughters. (Note: Also cited as 1917 and 1924.) Odeh worked teaching local peasant women to read and write in Russian and became a regional organizer for the Department for Work among Women of the Communist Party.

=== Academic career ===
Moving to Leningrad in 1924, with a recommendation from Krachkovsky, Odeh began teaching Arabic at the Leningrad Institute of Living Eastern Languages and began her PhD at Leningrad University. Upon completing her PhD on Arabic dialects in 1928, Odeh was appointed a lecturer of Arabic at the University of Leningrad’s Faculty of Oriental Languages; making her the first Palestinian and Arab woman to become a university professor. Odeh was also a member of the Arabic Department of the Institute of Philosophy, the Arts and History. In 1928, Odeh visited Mandatory Palestine and conducted ethnographic research on Palestinian folk customs. Exploring traditions surrounding birth, and peasant rituals during times of drought, Odeh demonstrated an interest in the role of Palestinian women, and condemned attitudes towards them. In one article, Odeh expressed disappointment that women in Palestine were less politically engaged than those in Syria and Egypt.

She later moved from Leningrad to Moscow, where she worked at the Orientalism Institute and lectured at the Institute for International Relations and the Higher Diplomatic School. Odeh was the first woman member of the Society of Soviet Cultural Relations with the Arab countries. In March 1938, Odeh was arrested during the Great Purge for her attempts to defend Aleksandr Shami and Sofya Roginskaya, two Arabists who'd been arrested the previous month. Odeh spent several months in prison without any charges being brought against her, but was ultimately released.

Believing in the role of literature in fostering understanding between individuals and nations, Odeh began to translate Soviet literature into Arabic, and later Arabic literature into Russian. In addition, she published many articles and short stories in the Russian press. Aged 70, Kulthum Odeh was awarded the Medal of Honor and the Medal of Friendship Among Nations by the Soviet authorities, recognising her contribution to improving international relations.

== Personal life and legacy ==
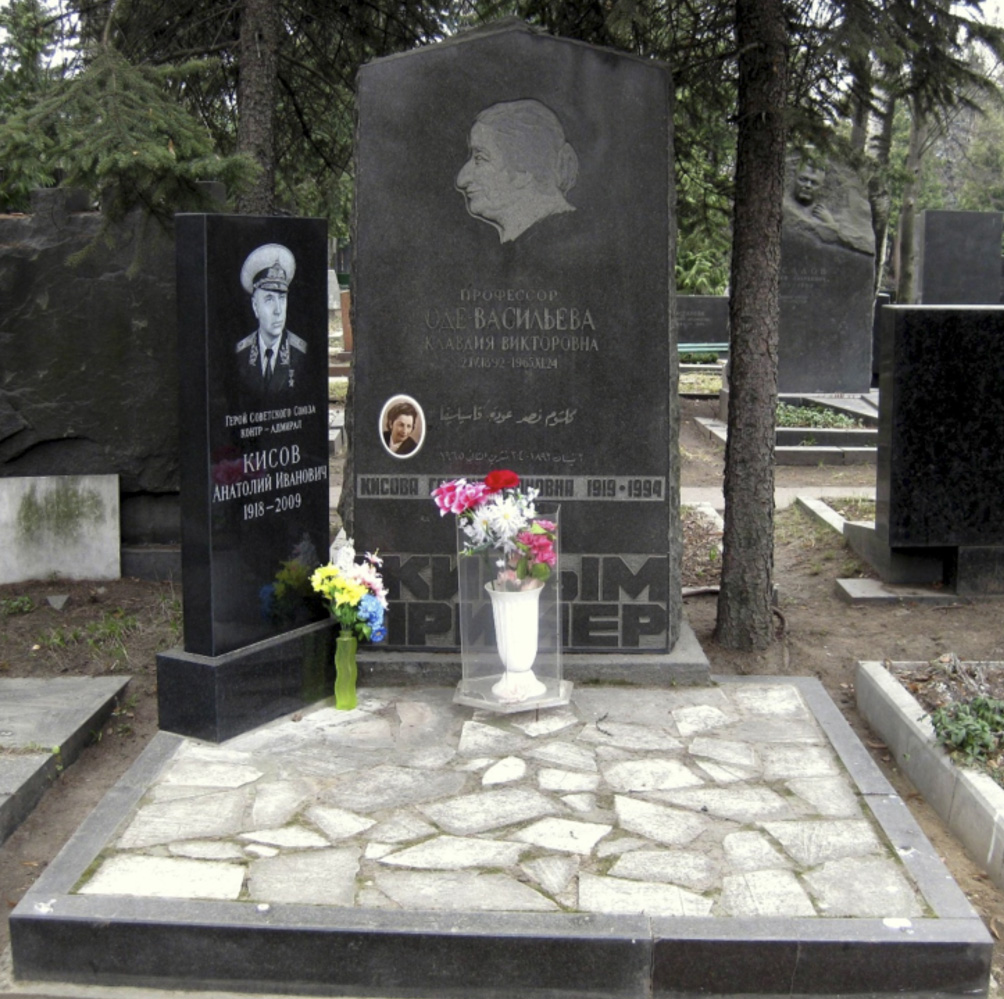
Odeh's grave at Novodevichy Cemetery, Moscow

In 1926, Odeh was granted Soviet citizenship, remaining with her daughters who were Soviet citizens by birth.

On 24 April 1965, Odeh died in Moscow. Odeh was buried at Novodevichy Cemetery, and her grave was visited by Tawfiq Ziad.

In 1990, she was posthumously awarded the Jerusalem Medal for Culture, Arts and Literature. A small collection of Odeh's personal photographs are housed at The Palestinian Museum, as part of the Tawfiq Zayyad Collection.
