= Returning to Haifa =

1969 novella Ghassan Kanafani

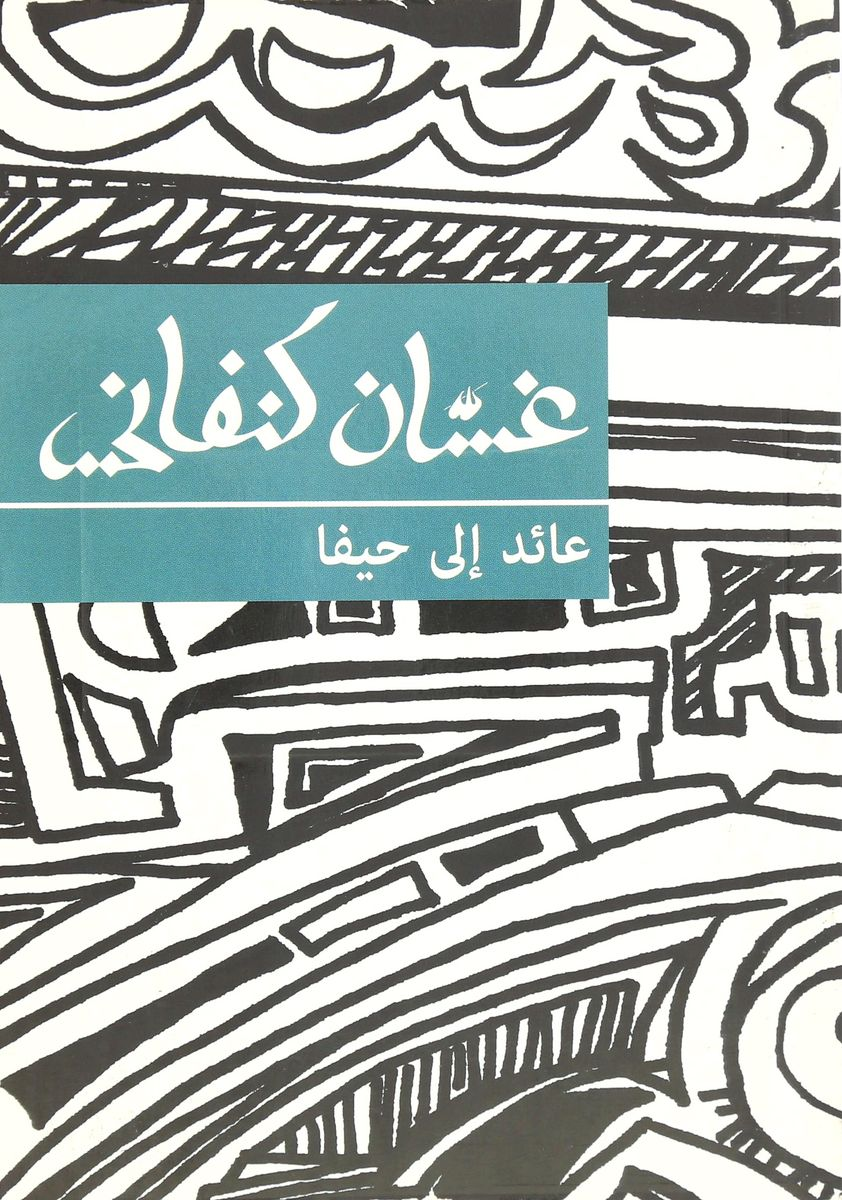
- Cover from a 2013 Arabic-language edition, featuring a drawing by Kanafani himself
- Author: Ghassan Kanafani
- Original title: عائد إلى حيفا
- Language: Arabic
- Genre: Novella
- Publication date: 1969
- Pages: 83

Returning to Haifa (Arabic: عائد إلى حيفا, romanized: ʿĀʾid ilā Ḥayfā) is a novella by Palestinian author and journalist Ghassan Kanafani depicting Israeli activity in formerly British-controlled Mandatory Palestine during and after the 1948 Battle of Haifa.

== Plot ==
The story begins with Said S. arriving in the city of Haifa in 1968 after the opening of the Mandelbaum Gate. The return brings forth an abundance of memories and mixed feelings taking him and his wife, Safiyah, 20 years back to the 21st of April 1948. The narrative flashes back to that day, when they were forced out of Haifa by Haganah attacks, leaving behind their home and their young son Khuldun. They were pushed onto a British ship that took them to the city of Acre.

The novel narrates that on this date, there was an explosion in Haifa coming from Mount Carmel. Said S felt overwhelmed as he saw everything getting worse, from armies arriving to more explosions happening, making it hard for him to navigate through. He and Safiya were on opposite sides of the city; as she rushed through the crowds of people to find him, she realised Khuldun was still sleeping inside their house at Hallisa.

They called out Khuldun's name numerous times, but there was no response. After she saw Said S. from afar, they both were on the verge of despair and tears, realising they had lost their son. Since then, they tried all means of searching for him, including contacting the Red Crescent and sending friends to the area to help them look.

Haifa was the core of all these memories for both Said S. and Safiya. "This is Haifa", as Said S. would say. Driving through the city, he contemplates everything, and how the street names "never really tended to change", still reading their names as King Faisal Street, Wadi NisNas, and so on. They speak about everything except Khuldun. A week before, in the city of Ramallah, Safiyah told Said S. how much she wanted to visit Haifa, "just to see it". Initially, he proclaimed the idea useless, but at the same time, he understood her desire, as he internally wanted the same, despite telling himself that there was no hope; they wanted to see if their son was still alive.

While at Haifa, they visit their old house and contemplate the memories, old objects, and the bell that changed. They find that the house is now occupied by Mariam, a Jewish woman. In 1948, after Said S and Safiyah departed on the British ship, their house was given to Marian and her husband, Iphrat Koshen. Mariam tells them the story of how they adopted Khuldun, now called Dov, from the Jewish Agency after a neighbour found him alone.

They stay at the house late waiting for Dov (Khuldun) to come, so that he can decide who he wants to be with after Mariam tells him the story. He comes home late at night, wearing his army suit, and after learning everything, he doesn't have any feelings toward his real parents. He said he is a Jew, and his parents were Jewish, despite knowing that they aren't his real parents; and despite knowing that his parents were Arab, nothing changed for him.

He blames Safiyah and Said because "they are the ones who left him, and could've searched for him instead of crying throughout these 20 years". Said S, feeling shocked and angry, tells Dov that he cannot use what he considers other people's fault to justify his own mistakes, as two wrongs don't make a right. He says to Mariam that she didn't tell Dov the whole truth by only saying that "his parents left him and went", as this ignores the context in which Said and Safiyah were forced to flee.

The story ends as Said realises how much he wants to leave, that he and Safiyah "never found their son from the first place as this can't be him." He reflects a conversation where he forbid his son Khalid from joining the Fidayeen. Now he realizes how much he appreciates Khalid, and he hopes that during this trip, Khalid has joined the Fidayeen against his father's initial wishes.

== Adaptations ==
The novella by Ghassan Kanafani was re-created into a number of films and plays, including:

=== Film and television ===
1982 Lebanese film, Return to Haifa, directed by Kassem Hawal. The film revolves around the same questions: who is the real mother? Who is the real father? What is a homeland, and whose is it? What is the way to return to Haifa?

1995 Iranian film, The Survivor, directed by Seifollah Dad. Based upon the script of Return to Haifa, the film talks about the Palestinian cause, telling the story of a Palestinian doctor who lives with his wife and Farahan, his son, in Haifa while facing the Israeli occupation.

2004 Syrian TV series, Return to Haifa, produced by Basil al Khatib. It discusses the Palestinian case from a humanitarian perspective, narrating the story of Palestinians during the 1948 war in Haifa, being forced out of their homes, through focusing on the destiny of a Palestinian family.

=== Theater ===
Returning to Haifa was adapted for the stage in Denmark, Lebanon, and state of Israel, where an Arabic and Hebrew version of it was created by Cameri Theatre of Tel Aviv. And in 2010, another version in English was produced by Evanston's Next Theatre, which deepened the ethical debate on translating and representing Palestinian issues.

The English language adaptation of Returning to Haifa was adapted for the stage by Naomi Wallace and Ismail Khalidi premiered in Finborough Theatre in London in 2018. The play was commissioned by New York's Public Theater but never reached the stage because of pressure from the board.

== Reviews ==
According to Israeli sociologist Yehouda Shenhav-Shahrabani, "the tremendous resonance in the media of 'Return to Haifa' established Kanafani's status at the apex of Palestinian and Arab culture. Despite his critical position towards the Jews, he sees them in the story; he speaks with Jews and gives them agency. That was the book's innovation, later influencing others."

According to reviews of these adaptations, the play is tightly focused in scope. Tiny space was configured at a central area with a minimalist set. Additionally, despite representing home, exile, and journey, it was saturated by warm Mediterranean light and enhanced by soundscape city and sea.

Additionally, the reviews pointed out to the "vivid" interplay between the past and present where actors, surrounded on all sides, moved fluidly among one another.

The characters' virtuosity with language enhanced on the tempo of the play, highlighting the difficulties of communication when political rhetoric faces emotion. The young characters of Said and Safiyya were said to have brought energy to scenes of early married life.

== See also ==
- Ghassan Kanafani
- Umm Saad
- The Hat and the Prophet
