= Al Joumhouria =

Lebanese newspaper

Al Joumhouria الجمهورية
- Type: Daily newspaper
- Format: Tabloid
- Owner: Elias Murr
- Publisher: Elias Murr
- Staff writers: 200
- Founded: 1924
- Political alignment: Right-wing, Lebanese nationalism, Christian democracy
- Language: Arabic
- Headquarters: Amara Bldg, Beirut, Lebanon
- Website: aljoumhouria.com

Al Joumhouria (Arabic: الجمهورية, lit. 'The Republic') is a Lebanese daily newspaper founded in 1924.

== History ==
After its founding in 1924, Al Joumhouria ceased publication for an extended period. At attempt at resuming in 1985 was not completed because of the Lebanese Civil War. A second, by owner and editor Elias Murr in 2005, was halted when a failed assassination attempt left Murr with serious injuries. Finally the paper was published on 28 February 2011, the first issue since the initial cessation of publication. Its release was accompanied by a significant advertising campaign featuring the paper's motto, "when silence became betrayal, Al Joumhouria spoke."

== Content ==
The paper is organized into sections: Local and international news, business, arts, science, health, style, culture, sports, technology, and religion; over 32 color pages. It is also available on for iPad—making Al Joumhouria the first Lebanese Arabic newspaper with an iPad application—and e-reader devices.

Leading caricaturist Pierre Sadek worked for the daily until his death in April 2013.

== Pan Arab ==
In 2015 it was announced that Al Joumhouria Newscorp Group would launch its Pan Arab News, marrying innovation and creativity with use smart technologies to offer its users a unique experience.

With more than 500 reporters in the Arab World, Al Joumhouria Pan Arab would have headquarters in Beirut, Saudi Arabia, the UAE and Egypt as well as accredited delegates in all the countries members of Gulf Cooperation Council (GCC). Pan Arab News will tackle Middle East news as well as the latest events in the Persian Gulf region.

Moreover, Bloomberg Businessweek Middle East editor Roger Field held an interview with Elias El Murr, during which he announced the aim at launching a pan-Arab newspaper this year.

== Website ==
Al Joumhouria.com is a leading news website in Lebanon and the Arab World covering local, regional and international news. The website was highly awarded in Lebanese and the Arab world.

Al Joumhouria.com has developed a mobile application for Apple, Windows phone, Windows 8, Android and Blackberry users, and was the first to send breaking news as push notifications in Arabic.
