= Al Bayan (magazine) =

Business magazine in Lebanon

- Categories: Business magazine
- Frequency: Monthly
- Publisher: Al Bayan Publishing House
- First issue: 1970; 56 years ago
- Company: Al Bayan Publishing House
- Country: Lebanon
- Based in: Beirut
- Language: Arabic
- Website: Al Bayan

Al Bayan ('The Statement') is an Arabic business magazine published monthly in Beirut, Lebanon. It has been circulated since 1970.

== History and profile ==
Al Bayan was launched by Al Bayan Publishing House in Beirut in 1970. The magazine is published on a monthly basis and appears on the first week of each month. It focuses on financial, economical and social news addressing bankers, financial institutions, insurance and reinsurance companies and brokers. It offers annual surveys about different sectors, including insurance, in Lebanon.

Al Bayan has several supplements and offers annual issues. The magazine is distributed in nearly all Arab countries in addition to its native Lebanon.

The 2012 circulation of Al Bayan was 88,100 copies. The study by Ipsos – Stat established that in 2013 the magazine had the highest share of the advertising revenues in the Arab market for the business and economic magazines.

== See also ==
- List of magazines in Lebanon
