= The Lover (Kanafani novel) =

1987 story collection by Ghassan Kanfani

The Lover is a 1987 collection of three incomplete novels by the Palestinian writer Ghassan Kanfani. The novels were published for the first time after Kanafani's assassination in the Palestinian magazine titled 'Shu'oon'. Despite that, the collection is one of the main books that universalized Kanafani's writing.

== About the collection ==
The collection is named after the first novel, The Lover or Al-Ashiq, and in it, Kanafani discusses Palestinian Resistance in a way that is different from the rest of his works. The second novel is titled The Plums of April or Barquq Nisan and the third novel is titled The Deaf and The Blind or Al-Atrash Wal A'ma. Kanafani's exploration of Palestinian Resistance in the next two novels are more familiar and similar to his usual way, which is through employing symbolism. For example, in The Plums of April or Barquq Nisan, Kanafani refers to plum trees and symbolizes them, giving thorough descriptions of them. These descriptions form the backdrop for the events in the novel.

Despite being incomplete, critics have considered this aspect to complement them even more. They believe that the novels' open-endedness lends them even more literary value and reinforce Kanafani's skill and influence in the genre of resistance literature.
