= Real Middle East =

- Editorial Manager: Varouj Tenbelian
- Frequency: Monthly
- Founded: 1974
- Country: Lebanon
- Based in: Beirut
- Language: English
- Website: http://www.realmiddleeast.com/

Real Middle East is a trade/consumer magazine devoted to real estate, architecture, lifestyle and design. It is committed to green living, and supports green movements, architecture and solutions. The English-language publication is based in Beirut, Lebanon, and includes an Arabic feature supplement.

== History and profile ==
Real Middle East was launched in 1974. The magazine is published 11 times a year (monthly except in December/January) and its circulation reached 25,500 in 2009. Subscription prices vary from US$45 to US$330, depending on the number of issues requested and subscriber location. Countries of distribution include all evolving markets in the region: UAE, Qatar, Kuwait, KSA, Bahrain, Lebanon, Syria and Jordan. IMC, Integrated Marketing & Communication, a subsidiary of IFP, publishes the magazine.

In October 2009, Real Middle East launched its second volume, a continuation of the first volume launched in 2007 as a trade publication. Volume 2 of Real Middle East features a contemporary design and covers a broad array of industry topics with a consumer-friendly perspective. It is available at major bookstores, targeting a wide range of readers and advertisers in key markets.

In support of the real estate and construction industries, Real Middle East announced media partnership with Project Qatar 2010 and Project Lebanon 2010, trade exhibitions for construction technology, building materials, equipment and environmental technology. The magazine was also the exclusive media sponsor of the 2010 Qatar Sustainability Conference, which tackled energy and water efficiency in construction.

== See also ==
List of magazines in Lebanon
