= Sowar (magazine) =

Lebanese photo magazine

- Cover of the third issue
- Editorial director: Hassan Osman
- Categories: Photo journal
- Frequency: Bimonthly
- First issue: 2007; 19 years ago
- Country: Lebanon
- Based in: Beirut
- Language: Arabic
- Website: Sowar

Sowar (Arabic: صور, romanized: ṣuwar, lit. 'pictures/photographs') is a bimonthly photojournalism and documentary photography magazine published in Beirut, Lebanon.

Sowar magazine launched in 2007, and is issued six times per year. Hassan Osman is the founder and editorial director of the magazine.

The focus of topics in Sowar magazine is mainly on events, cultures, individuals and scenes in Lebanon, the Middle East and the Gulf regions.

== See also ==
List of magazines in Lebanon
