= Al-Hadaf =

Palestinian weekly political and cultural magazine

- Categories: Political magazine; Cultural magazine
- Frequency: Weekly
- First issue: 1969; 57 years ago
- Country: Palestine
- Based in: Beirut; Damascus; Gaza City
- Language: Arabic
- Website: Al Hadaf

Al-Hadaf (Arabic: الهدف, The Target) is a Palestinian weekly political and cultural magazine published in Gaza City. Established in 1969, the magazine was headquartered in several cities, including Beirut and Damascus.

== History and profile ==
Al Hadaf was founded in Beirut in 1969 by Ghassan Kanafani as the political mouthpiece of the Popular Front for the Liberation of Palestine (PFLP), espousing a Marxist–Leninist version of pan-Arab Palestinian nationalism. Kanafani also served as the editor-in-chief of the weekly. Deputy editor was Bassam Abu Sharif. In 1972, Kanafani was assassinated by a car bomb planted in his car by the Israeli Mossad, but Al Hadaf remains in publication. Abu Sharif replaced him as editor of the magazine. The headquarters of the magazine was moved to Damascus, Syria, in 1986 where it was subject to the strict censorship of the Syrian government.

Al-Hadaf is based in Gaza City, Palestine.

== See also ==
- List of magazines in Lebanon
