= Saleh Morsi =

Egyptian screenwriter and novelist

Saleh Morsi (Arabic: صالح مرسي; born 1929 in Kafr El-Zayat), was an Egyptian screenwriter and novelist best known for his espionages thrillers. He died of a heart attack in Alexandria, Egypt in August 1996. The number of his books translated into Persian.

== Works ==
- Raafat el-Haggan, television series.
- Samia Fehmi, novel.
