= A World Not Our Own =

Short story collection by Ghassan Kanafani

A World Not Our Own (Arabic: عالم ليس لنا) is a short story collection by the Palestinian militant and author Ghassan Kanafani. All the stories in this collection were written between 1959 and 1963, lest for the last story, which was written in 1965. The anthology was published for the first time in 1965 in Beirut. The collection portrays the life of the average Palestinian citizen under the occupation, centering on the never-ending fear and anxiety. Kanafani focuses on the usage of figurative language to address the Palestinian Cause and its effects on Palestinians in Palestine and in the diaspora. The collection takes inspiration from Kanafani's biography, and his struggle with alienation. It also deals with his insistence on his intellectual and physical resistance. Kanafani's preference to use figurative language has political and literary purposes, which he elaborates on in his study Resistance Literature in Occupied Palestine: 1948–1966.

Kanafani addresses his idea of intellectual and weaponized resistance, and this idea persists throughout his oeuvre. The influences of Modernism on Kanafani could be detected in many elements of the collection, primarily his choice to make marginalized characters the protagonists of his stories. Despite the stories centering on different plots, they all go on to form one main message, and it is that of geographical alienation.

== Stories in the collection ==
The collection is composed of fifteen short stories, including: Judranun Min Hadid (Walls of Iron), Al-Saqr (The Falcon), Kafarul Munajjim (The Foreteller's Village), Judranuhu Wa Kaffuhu Wa Assabi’uhu (His walls, Palm, and Fingers), Al-Munazalaq (The Slide), Ulbatul Zujajin Wahida (A Glass Bottle), Atashul Afa’a (The Snake's Thirst), Law Kuntu Hisanan (If I Were A Horse), Nisful ‘Aalam (Half of The World), Al-Shati' (The Beach), Risala Min Masuood (A Letter From Masuood), Jahsh (Donkey), Ra’asul Asad Al-Hajari (The Lion’s Stone Head), and Al-’Aroos (The Bride).

== Reception ==
The anthology gained recognition from artists and critics alike. In fact, it went on to inspire the documentary “A World Not Ours,” which follows the Palestinian refugee camp, Ain Al-Helwe, in Lebanon.
