= A Death in Bed No. 12 =

1961 book by Ghassan Kanafani

A Death in Bed No.12
- Author: Ghassan Kanafani
- Language: Arabic
- Publication date: 1961
- Publication place: Beirut

A Death in Bed No.12 is the first collection of stories written by Ghassan Kanafani. It was published in Beirut in 1961 with a short introduction by Ghassan that said: "I believe that the book should introduce itself, and if it fails to fulfill part of its writers' ambition, then the writer must simply accept it, as before- times and times- before the writers rips the stories to write them again, and like that, I push "A Death in Bed No.12" to find its own way, if it could find the beginning of the way". This collection of stories mainly explore the feeling of exile, which is portrayed through unilateral attachment to the past. The title comes from a story in the second part of the book. The revolves around a patient writing a letter to his friend Ahmed telling him about a death incident in bed 12, and about how each one of us hears about and perceives death differently. Ghassan Kanafani send in the introduction to an anonymous family whom their eldest son "Mohammed Ali Akbar" died away and alone in bed number 12.

== About the writer ==
Ghassan Kanafani was born in Acre city on 9 April 1936, and lived in Jaffa until May 1948 when he was forced to leave his country due to the Israeli occupation in 1948. He then lived in the south of Lebanon and after that his family moved to Damascus. His father worked as a lawyer specializing in national lawsuits and was arrested several times. He was a self made man and had a big effect on Ghassan's live and personality. Ghassan Kanafani was assassinated on 8 July 1972 by an explosive device in his car.

== About the story collection ==
The story collection is divided into 3 main parts, and each parts contains 5 or 6 stories revolving around Palestine, reality and existential questions.

=== Stories of the first part ===
- The owl in a far room
- Something doesn't go away
- The middle of May
- Cake on the sidewalk
- In my funeral

=== Stories of the second part ===
- A Death in Bed No.12
- A pearl on the way
- The man who didn't die
- Thirst
- 8 Minutes

=== Stories of the third part ===
- The shoulders of others
- Six eagles and a baby
- The cat
- Crucified sheep
- The slaves castle

== Quotes ==
- "But I was living for a fearless tomorrow, and I would starve to be full one day..and I wanted to reach that tomorrow..there was no value to my life other than the deep green hope that it gave that the sky cannot be infinitely cruel..and that this child, the one on whose lips the smile of reassurance broke, would continue his life that way, torn like October clouds, grey like misty valleys, lost like a sun who came to shine but didn't find its horizon."
- "How painful and cruel is the moment when one wants to cry but nonetheless cannot."
- "I discovered – just like you should've discovered long ago – how important it is for some people to die..for the others to live..it's and old wisdom..the most important thing in it now..is that I am living it."
- "We always give people our traits and look at them through a strait of our opinions and thinking, we want them to be us as much as we can..we want to stuff them into our skins, give themour eyes to look with them, and cloth them with our past and our way of facing life..place them within frameworks drawn by our current understanding of time and space.
- "The issue of death is not the issue of the dead, but the issue of the rest"
