= List of magazines in Lebanon =

In Lebanon the first Arabic journal was an annual review, Majmu fawaid li nukhbat afadil which was first published in 1851. The first political, literary, and scientific magazine, the first children's magazine, and the women's magazine in the country were established in the period between 1870 and 1896. These were also the first specialized publications in the Arab world. In 1927 there were 121 magazines in Lebanon. The Lebanese magazines reinforced the improvement and modernization of Arabic literature and liberal thought in the first half of the 20th century.

As of 2012, there were Arabic language, English language and French language magazines in the country. In 2015 there were 192 political magazines in Lebanon which were 16% of the magazines published the Middle East and North Africa. There are also editions of international magazines, including Marie Claire, in Lebanon.

The following is an incomplete list of current and defunct magazines published in Lebanon.

== A ==
- Abaad
- Achabaka
- Al Adab
- Al Adib
- Al Arab
- Assayad
- At-Tabib

== B ==
- Al-Bashir
- Al Bayan
- Al Bia wal Tanmia

== C ==
- Le Commerce du Levant

== E ==
- Elle Oriental (2006 to 2020)
- Elle Decoration Liban (2015 to 2020)
- Executive

== F ==
- Falastin Al Thawra
- Falastinuna

== H ==
- Al-Hadaf
- Al Hadatha
- Hask
- Al Hasnaa
- Al Hawadeth
- Al Hiwar

== I ==
- Al Iktissad Wal Aamal
- Al-Irfan (magazine)

== J ==
- Al Jaras
- Jasad
- Al Jinan

== K ==
- Al Karmel

== L ==
- Lebanon Opportunities
- Lotus
- L'Officiel Levant (1984 to 1989; 2009 to 2019)
- L'Officiel Hommes Levant (2010 to 2019)

== M ==
- Al-Machriq
- Madame Figaro (closed)
- Magazine le mensuel
- Al Marad
- Marie Claire (closed)
- Massis
- Mawaqif
- Al Mawed
- Al Mughtareb
- Al Muqtataf

== N ==
- Nadine
- Al Nahla
- Nayiri

== P ==
- Pakin
- Prestige

== R ==
- Real
- La Revue Phénicienne

== S ==
- Sawt al-Mahrumin
- Shi'r
- Ash-Shiraa
- Shirak
- Shu'un Filastinyya
- Snob
- Sowar

== T ==
- Al Tariq
- Today's Outlook

== See also ==
- List of newspapers in Lebanon
