= Men in the Sun =

1962 novel by Ghassan Kanafani

Men in the Sun (Arabic: رجال في الشمس, romanized: Rijāl fī al-Shams) is a novel by Palestinian author Ghassan Kanafani (1936–72), originally published in 1962. Men in the Sun follows three Palestinian refugees seeking to travel from the refugee camps in Iraq, where they cannot find work, to Kuwait where they hope to find work as laborers in the oil boom.

== Summary ==
Three Palestinian men, Abu Qais, Marwan, and Assad, of different generations seeking work arrange with a clerk in Basra to be smuggled to Kuwait by a driver. The men are treated gruffly and are humiliated by the process. They decide instead to arrange for travel with a lorry driver, a Palestinian man whom the reader later learns was castrated by a bomb attack during the Nakba. The men ride in the back of the truck across the desert on their way to Kuwait. At two checkpoints, the men hide in a large empty water tank in the stifling mid-day heat as the driver arranges paperwork to get through. At the second check point, within easy driving distance of the travellers' ultimate goal of Kuwait, the driver is held up too long by checkpoint bureaucrats who tease him over a rumour of his sexual relations. Once the driver is able to drive past the check point, he opens the tank to let the men out, only to find that they have suffocated in the heat.

== Characters ==
- Abu Qais: The first of the three Palestinian men migrating to Kuwait introduced. Abu Qais is the oldest character who has memory of the 1948 Nakba, often reminiscing on the ten olive trees he once had in Palestine. He is uneducated and characterized as easily frustrated and helpless. Abu Qais is pushed to find work in Kuwait when he is shamed by his younger friend, Saad, and his wife, Umm Qais to provide a better life for his children.
- Assad: Introduced in the novella as he is negotiating with the proprietor over the price to be smuggled into Kuwait. He has been cheated before by a smuggler who left him stranded around H4. His uncle loaned him money to travel so that he will eventually marry Nada, the Uncle's daughter but Assad doesn't want to marry her. He has had run-ins with authorities due to his political activities.
- Marwan: The youngest character at only 16 years of age. He wishes to pursue his education and become a doctor but must find work in Kuwait to support his family since his father has abandoned them for his new wife and his brother has stopped sending money after getting married.
- Abul Khaizuran: The truck driver who agrees to smuggle the three men. He tells fantastic tales of his agile driving and strong repute, but the memory that continually haunts him and remains unrevealed to any other characters is his surgical castration ten years before as a freedom fighter. He is disillusioned by the national cause and "wishes only for money". In the final chapter, he is held up by bureaucrats that tease him about a rumor involving him and a prostitute and the three men die in the tank due to this needless delay.

== Themes ==
The most notable themes are impotence, masculinity, exile, and loss. Each of the three men navigates power dynamics differently as exemplified in their pleads and demands with the smuggling proprietor. Abu Qais helplessly "throws himself on the damp earth" when he can't negotiate the price, Assad asserts that he will pay the smugglers only after arriving in Kuwait, and Marwan threatens to tell the police about the proprietor's smuggling business if he doesn't drop the price. Abu Khaizuran seems to enjoy relative power and ease of mobility because of his boss' repute and access to the truck but he is impotent from a surgical castration he endured ten years prior. Crossing the border into Kuwait, the three men must hide in the insufferable tank while Abu Khaizuran gets his papers signed but he is delayed by the bureaucrats teasing him for supposedly being serviced by a prostitute. Fadl Naqib interprets that this plot where "the truck driver is suspected of sexual hijinks even though he's sexually impotent symbolizes the Arab armies suspected of a passion for war and ravishing Israel even though they were militarily impotent." The fact that none of the three men are privy to Abul Khaizuran's injury may also represent Palestinians duped by their ineffective leadership.

Performances of masculinity are central to the plot of Men in the Sun. The older male characters especially exemplify this performance as they belong to the generation that "lost Palestine''. Abu Qais is emasculated by his loss of land and the poverty he and his family endure in a refugee camp. His inability to provide for his family threatens his position as the man of the "household" and drives him to find work in Kuwait despite the risk. This shame captures the breakdown of gender structures in exile. Abul Khaizuran also performs gender as he cannot deny the rumors of his sexual escapade and reveal his impotence. In response to Abu Baqir's demands to hear the story of his encounter with a prostitute, he deflects "if Hajj told you already, why do you want me to tell it again", implicitly confirming the tale. Here, Abul Khaizuran is pulled into a game of performing masculinity while the three men in his tank suffocate.

The setting of Men in the Sun is also significant. The Men's journey through Basra to Kuwait both captures the historical reality of Palestinian migration during the oil boom and symbolizes the precarity of displacement. The men ride across the desert, at times in the water tank, incapable of dictating their direction, left at the will of an impotent driver. "No longer "masters" of their own environments, identities or destinies, the men find themselves suspended in a 'no-man's land' strongly reminiscent of Palestine itself". As exiles being smuggled into Kuwait, the three men are no longer agents of their own bodies or fates. Their inability to knock on the sides of the tank captures this powerlessness, where the men are torn between fear of discovery and the need to escape the suffocating tank and rendered incapable of taking any action. The final lines of the novella, "Why didn't you knock on the sides of the tank? Why didn't you bang the sides of the tank? Why? Why? Why?" reflect the frustration with Palestinian passivity following the 1948 Nakba. In this way, Men in the Sun can be understood as a didactic tale.

== Depictions ==
Men in the Sun has been translated into many languages. Its description of the hardships and insecurity of Palestinian refugee life, and its political and psychological subtext (subtly criticizing corruption, political passivity and defeatism within Arab and Palestinian society) affected the Arab cultural and political debate of the time. It also uses modernist narrative structures and storytelling methods.

Men in the Sun has been filmed as al-Makhdu'un (The Deceived or The Dupes), by Egyptian director Tawfiq Saleh.

The ending of the 1972 film was altered to show the three Palestinians beating on the walls of their hiding place as they suffocate. This ending was intended to reflect the political reality at a time when resistance movements had been established in the wake of the 1967 war.

Men in the Sun was originally published in 1962. In the novella, the Palestinians die in silence.

Radio artist Joe Frank mentions Men in the Sun in his show 'Another country, part 1', the version in which they die in silence.
