= Palestine studies =

Interdisciplinary academic field focusing on the study of the region of Palestine

Palestine studies or Palestinian Studies is an interdisciplinary field dealing with the research and study of the civilization, history, literature, art and culture of Palestinian people. This field is a part of the wider field of Oriental studies.

Palestine studies is distinct from Arab studies, which is the study of Arabic culture, the Arabic language and literature specifically. This field includes anthropology, postcolonial studies, gender studies, cultural studies, and English and comparative literature.

== Background ==
The field of Palestine studies has evolved significantly since its inception. Prior to the late 1980s, the study of Palestine was approached through Western social theories that emphasized the mission of European settlers and colonists to guide the natives to modernity.

Orientalism has had a significant impact on the perception of Palestine and its people in the Western world. Edward Said's work on Orientalism highlighted the negative attitudes and stereotypes that Western writers and orientalists held towards the East, including Palestine. The rise of biblical archaeology in 19th century, driven by European powers competing for control of Palestine, led to extensive archaeological exploration and the domination of biblical studies. The establishment of the Palestine Exploration Fund in 1865 and the subsequent excavation of major sites during the golden age of biblical archaeology in the 1920s further shaped the disciplines of archaeology and biblical studies.

in recent years, there has been a shift in the study of Israel, the Arab countries, and ethnic relations in Palestine-Israel. There has been a move towards social and cultural history in the study of Late Ottoman and Mandate-era Palestine, exploring issues of gender, class, race, and empire.

== Academic centers ==
- Institute for Palestine Studies(IPS)
- The European Centre for Palestine Studies at University of Exeter
- The Center for Palestine Studies at Columbia University
- The Centre for Palestine Studies (CPS) at SOAS University of London
- Brown University Center for Palestine Studies at Brown University
- Palestinian American Research Center
- Cambridge Centre for Palestine Studies
- Hearing Palestine at University of Toronto
- Palestinian Center for Policy and Survey Research (PSR)
- Palestine Exploration Fund
- Palestine Association
- The Palestine Oriental Society
- British School of Archaeology at Jerusalem
- Hashim Sani Center for Palestine Studies at University of Malaya

== Journals and magazines ==
- Journal of Palestine Studies
- Journal of Holy Land and Palestine Studies
- Jerusalem Quarterly
- Palestine-Israel Journal
- Bulletin of Palestine Studies (BPS)
- Palestine/Israel Review

== See also ==
- Middle Eastern studies
- Arabist
- Orientalism
