= Assayad =

News weekly in Beirut, Lebanon (1943–2018)

- Categories: Newsweekly
- Frequency: Weekly
- Circulation: 76,192 (2009)
- Publisher: Dar Assayad
- First issue: 22 November 1943
- Final issue: 2018
- Company: Dar Assayad
- Country: Lebanon
- Based in: Beirut
- Language: Arabic
- Website: Assayad
- ISSN: 0250-3549
- OCLC: 473862707

Assayad (Arabic: Hunter) was a weekly news magazine published in Lebanon between 1943 and 2018. It was the first pan-Arab magazine in the country. Its headquarters was in Beirut.

== History and profile ==
Assayad was launched by Dar Assayad publishing house led by Said Freiha on 22 November 1943. Freiha was an advocate of Gamal Abdel Nasser, Egyptian president. The publishing house also owned other publications including daily Al Anwar.

The magazine was based in Beirut and had offices in various cities including Riyadh, Abu Dhabi, Dubai, Cairo, Damascus, Amman, London, and Paris. In Fall 2018 the Dar Assayad publishing house ended its operations and closed the magazine together with other publications.

== Contributors ==
Many prominent journalists worked for the magazine: Mustafa Ameen, Nizar Kabbani, Selim El Laouzi, Amin Malouf, Melhem Karam, Said Akl, Nabil Khoury, Hisham Abu Zahr, and Talal Salman. Palestinian journalist Bayan Nuwayhed was a regular contributor of Assayad from 1960 to 1966. Lebanese journalist Jean Obeid joined the magazine in 1966. Lebanese caricaturist Pierre Sadek also work in the magazine.

From 1967 to 1972, its editor-in-chief was Palestinian journalist and writer Ghassan Kanafani. As of 2012, the editorial team of the magazine included Raouf Chahour, Rafik Khoury, George Trad and Lima Nabil.

== Content and circulation ==
Assayad carried articles about politics, economy, social affairs in the Arab and international context. In addition, it covered arts, entertainment, and life style topics. The magazine also published interviews, one of which was with Leila Ben Ali, former first lady of Tunisia.

In 2009 Assayad sold 76,192 copies.

== See also ==
List of magazines in Lebanon
