= Bassam Abu Sharif =

Palestinian politician (born 1946)

- بسام أبو شريف
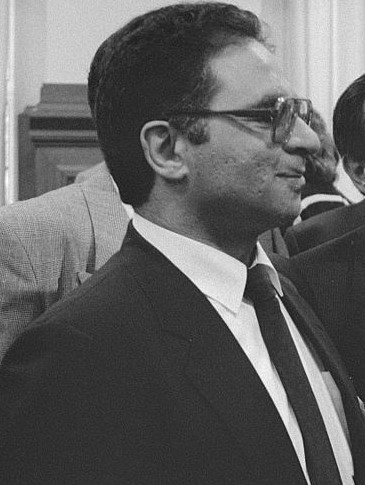
- Bassam Abu Sharif in 1989

Personal details
- Born: August 9, 1946 (age 80) Jerusalem, Mandatory Palestine
- Children: Omar and Karma
- Education: American University of Beirut
- Occupation: Former Senior Adviser to Yasser Arafat

Bassam Abu Sharif (Arabic: بسام أبو شريف; born August 9, 1946 in Jerusalem) is a former senior adviser to Yasser Arafat and leading cadre of the Palestine Liberation Organization (PLO). He was previously a member of the Popular Front for the Liberation of Palestine (PFLP).

A Marxist and an admirer of Mao Zedong and Che Guevara, Abu Sharif, then a member of the PFLP, was dubbed the "face of terror" by Time magazine for his role in the Dawson's Field hijackings in 1970, when the PFLP hijacked Pan Am, Swissair, and TWA flights and blew them up in the Jordanian desert, triggering King Hussein's expulsion of the PLO from Jordan, which became known as Black September. A fourth pair of hijackers on an El Al flight were overpowered by security guards and passengers.

== Early life and education ==
Abu Sharif was born in the Old City of Jerusalem on 9 August 1946. His parents were upper-middle-class Sunni Muslims and had been residing in Amman, Jordan, since 1943 due to the fact that his father was working at the Arab Bank. He graduated from a secondary school in Irbid, Jordan. In 1963 he began his studies at the American University of Beirut and graduated from the university in 1967.

== Career ==
=== PFLP ===
Abu Sharif organized, and participated in, many actions against Israel. He worked as the deputy editor and then editor of the Al-Hadaf magazine which was linked to the Popular Front for the Liberation of Palestine (PFLP). He lost four fingers, and was left deaf in one ear and blind in one eye, when a bomb exploded in his hands in Beirut, Lebanon, in 1972. The assassination attempt was carried out by Mossad who hid the explosives in the book The Memoirs of Che Guevara, and sent the book to Sharif.

Within the PFLP, Abu Sharif gradually began to favour a reduced emphasis on armed struggle and closer cooperation with Fatah, the dominant Palestine Liberation Organization (PLO) faction. As a result, he was removed from the PFLP Politburo in 1981 and was appointed to run external relations. After drawing closer to Fatah leader Yasser Arafat and meeting Egyptian President Hosni Mubarak, Abu Sharif was expelled from the PFLP in 1987.

=== Later life ===
After leaving the PFLP in 1987, in a non-partisan role, Abu Sharif became a senior adviser to Yasser Arafat. Abu Sharif was able to float some peace proposals based on a two-state solution and preparing Palestinians for the compromises made during the Oslo process. He returned to Ramallah in 1996 as a presidential adviser and often wrote statements of the Palestinian position in the peace process.

In 1995, Abu Sharif co-authored the book Best of Enemies with Uzi Mahnaimi, an Israeli Mossad journalist who previously served in the Israeli military intelligence corps. Abu Sharif also published a political memoir entitled Arafat and the Dream of Palestine.

Writing in the Palestinian newspaper al-Quds in April 2005, Abu Sharif called for a "popular peaceful uprising" of Palestinians through massive nonviolent resistance to prevent Israel from annexing any additional land in the West Bank.

== Personal life ==
Abu Sharif has two children from a previous marriage.

== Opinions ==
In an interview on Abu Dhabi TV on April 25, 2010 (as translated by MEMRI), Abu Sharif claimed that former Israeli Prime Minister David Ben-Gurion was responsible for the assassination of John F. Kennedy, due to Kennedy's policy regarding Israel's Dimona nuclear plant.

Ben-Gurion gave the order to assassinate Kennedy. I take full responsibility for every word I say. The Mossad collaborated with the American mafia, and once Oswald had killed Kennedy, the Mossad sent a Jew called [Jack] Ruby to kill him. Then the Mossad killed 22 witnesses, and the case was closed ... these files have not been made public, due to Jewish Zionist pressure.

In the same interview, Abu Sharif alleged that US President Barack Obama was the target of an assassination plot by Yemenite Jews:

I am warning the American agencies, like the CIA and FBI, which are fast asleep, that a plot to assassinate Obama is in motion, and that the group that will attempt to assassinate Obama consists of Yemenite Jews under the guise of Al-Qaeda.

Abu Sharif declined to provide a source for his allegations, but stated that: "I am responsible for every word I say, and if they want to know more, they can come to me."

== Awards ==
Abu Sharif received the special medal of the Soviet Union of Journalists in 1980.

== Works ==
- Bassam Abu Sharif and Uzi Mahnaimi. The Best of Enemies: The Memoirs of Bassam Abu-Sharif and Uzi Mahnaimi, 1995. ISBN 978-0-316-00401-5
- Tried by Fire, 1996. ISBN 978-0-7515-1636-4
- Bassam Abu Sharif, Arafat and the Dream of Palestine: An Insider's Account (2009) - ISBN 978-0-230-60801-6
