= Umm Saad =

1969 novella by Ghassan Kanafani

Umm Saʻd
- First edition
- Author: Ghassan Kanafani
- Original title: أم سعد
- Language: Arabic
- Genre: Novella
- Publication date: 1969
- Pages: 78

Umm Saad (Arabic: أم سعد / ALA-LC: Umm Saʻd) is a novella written by fiction writer and journalist Ghassan Kanafani. The book discusses themes of war, patience, and resistance through a first point of view perspective. Upon its release, its political and social themes were generally praised.

== Background ==
The character Umm Saad is real, as she lived with Kanafani's family for many years, and represents Palestinian revolutionary women, in specific Palestinian mothers who "give birth to children only for them to became part of the Fedayeen eventually, experiencing fear and pain of loss", along with Palestinians suffering due to war overall.

== Characters ==
- Umm Saad: A strong Palestinian woman, and the narrator's cousin in the story; they lived together for many years in al-Ghabasiya until she moved to camps, where she'd visit them every Tuesday.
- Saad: Umm Saad's son. They live far from each other due to the fact he went with the Fedayeen, along with getting arrested.

== Plot ==
Umm Saad revolves around the character with the same name, who is described as strong, patient, and revolutionary, representing not only herself as a Palestinian woman but Palestinian women overall, and a narrator tells the story from a first point of view perspective. The novella revolved around war, patience, and resistance, along with how Umm Saad felt, throughout their conversations together.

The loss at war, being away from her son, and still managing to remain active and standing tall, helping and taking risks in critical areas, Umm Saad was narrating and not just having a regular conversation with Kanafani; her feelings of despair towards the constant bad news heard through the radio, or following up on her son, Saad, who went with the Fedayeen, but was arrested and tortured, expressing how Palestinian women experience the pain of loss, distance, and deprivation in camps. Broken down in tears at some point through the storyline, Umm Saad wishes she lives somewhere safe and clean and not suffer through the coldness of camps.

It was later told in the story that Saad gave his mother a car gift, hinting, according to Umm Saad, that he wanted to destroy an Israeli car, news which made Umm Saad feel delighted. Saad then appears again with his friends in the camp, after a bullet attacked him, where his mother takes full care of them. The story ends when Saad informs the family that his friend, Laith, was arrested, making them deal with a betrayer who works with Israelis in order to set him free. Laith insists on the other family not to deal with the betrayer so they don't die, which symbolised the Palestinians' insistence on not wanting to deal with the Israelis.

== Reception ==
Despite its literary and technical simplicity, the novella is considered to be one of Kanafani's major pieces as it shows the writer's political consciousness. Odette David points out to physical features of Umm Saad associated with elements of nature such as wood, trees, soil, and water that make her character be "Mother-Earth".

On the other hand, Egyptian author, Radwa Ashur, accused Kanafani of depicting the image of women as a mother in the story, and argued that her political contributions made her closer to be a revolutionary mother rather than a revolutionary in itself.

However, director of Al Rawat Foundation, Fayha Abdulhadi, considered Umm Saad's character to be epic, and a model for the socialist realism books.
