= Tewfik Saleh =

Egyptian film director (1926–2013)

- Born: 27 October 1926; Alexandria, Kingdom of Egypt
- Died: 18 August 2013 (aged 86); Cairo, Egypt
- Occupations: film director and writer
- Notable work: Struggle of the Heroes

Tewfik Saleh (Arabic: توفيق صالح) was an Egyptian film director and writer. His name has also been written as Tawfik Saleh and Tewfiq Salah.

== Biography ==
Saleh was born on 27 October 1926, in Alexandria. Although his father was against his interest in movies, he still considered movies to be his major interest. In 1949, he graduated from Victoria College of Alexandria. He died on 18 August 2013 in Cairo.

His first film was Fools' Alley (1955), co-written by Naguib Mahfouz, the Egyptian Nobel laureate in Literature. Saleh's other movies include Struggle of the Heroes (1962) and The Rebels (1968) among others.

Saleh died on 18 August 2013 at the age of 86 in Cairo, Egypt.

== Selected filmography ==
- Struggle of the Heroes (1962)
- Sayed al-Bolti (1969)
- The Dupes (1973)
- Al-ayyam al-tawila (1980)
