= Al Anwar (Lebanese newspaper) =

Lebanese daily newspaper (1959–2018)

- Al Anwar front page (11 July 2016)
- Type: Daily newspaper
- Format: Broadsheet
- Founder: Said Freiha
- Publisher: Dar Assayad publishing house
- Editor-in-chief: Rafiq Khoury
- Founded: 1959
- Ceased publication: 2018
- Political alignment: Non-affiliated; Centrist
- Language: Arabic
- Headquarters: Beirut
- Circulation: 49,043 (2012)
- OCLC number: 35739476
- Website: Al Anwar

Al Anwar (Arabic: الانوار, lit. 'The Lights') was an Arabic daily newspaper published in Beirut, Lebanon. It was founded in 1959 and was one of the leading dailies in Lebanon.

In October 2018, the publisher Dar Assayad announced ceasing of the print edition of the publication after 58 years of continuous publishing. The company also ceased the publication of its line of long-running periodicals, including weekly news magazine Assayad, weekly arts and entertainment magazine Achabaka, monthly women's magazine Fayrouz, monthly men's magazine Al Fares and monthly military magazine Al Difa' Al Arabi.

== History and profile ==
Al Anwar was launched by the publishing house Dar Assayad in 1959. The company also owned several daily, weekly and monthly publications, including Assayad magazine. The founder of the daily was Said Freiha who was an advocate of Egyptian President Gamal Abdel Nasser. The headquarters of the paper was in Beirut.

On 20 October 1962 Al Anwar and another newspaper Al Shaab were closed by the government for five days due to their alleged insults towards the heads of foreign countries.

During the early years Al Anwar had just eight pages. It was published in broadsheet format. The daily launched its website in 1996.

== Orientation ==
Al Anwar claimed that it reinforced the long-term stability and prosperity of Lebanon. The paper was one of the Lebanese publications in the early 1960s which called for the end of the Palestinian Amin al-Husseini's activities. It had a hostile approach towards the Fatah members in the mid-1960s calling them CIA agents. However, this attitude changed after Ghassan Kanafani, the spokesperson of the Popular Front for the Liberation of Palestine (PFLP), joined the paper. He and Wadie Haddad, the PFLP leader, held a press conference at the headquarters of Al Anwar following the hijacking of the Israeli El Al flight by the PFLP on 23 July 1968.

Al Anwar was described by BBC in 2013 as an independent and centrist daily. It is further argued that the paper avoided aggressive reporting. However, during and after the Nasser era the paper had a pro-Egyptian stance. In the mid-1990s the paper was considered to have an Arab nationalist trend. In 2009, IREX, an international research board, regarded it as one of the advocates of the 14 March Alliance.

== Staff and content ==
The editor-in-chief of Al Anwar was Rafiq Khoury and its managing editor was Fouad Daaboul. Issam Freiha was one of the editors-in-chief of the paper. Lebanese journalist Jean Obeid joined the paper in 1966. Palestinian journalist and writer Ghassan Kanafani served in the editorial board of the paper from 1967 to 1969. Another Palestinian contributor of Al Anwar was Bayan Nuwayhed from 1960 to 1966.

Al Anwar covered both Lebanese and Arabic affairs. At the very beginning of the civil war Al Anwar published statistical surveys of casualties. For instance, it reported that a total of 2314 people was killed between 13 April and 6 July 1975. The last page of the daily included sports and social news.

One of the major contributors of Al Anwar was former Saudi oil minister Abdullah Tariki who was living in Beirut after his removal from office. He published an open letter to the Shah of Iran, Mohammad Reza Pahlavi, in Al Anwar on 19 May 1969. Another contributor was Bishara Merhej who wrote articles for the economy section of the paper.

Al Anwar published many significant interviews, including one with Saudi royal Prince Fahd, later King Fahd, in 1974. Following the assassination of the former Lebanese Prime Minister Rafiq Hariri, the daily published three articles from 16 to 18 February 2005 the first two of which were written by editor-in-chief, Khoury. The last one was a commentary titled "The mentality of the paupers and a regime in coma" written by Rauf Shahuri. All articles condemned the assassination. In August 2013 the paper criticized the possible US-led intervention against Syria and stated that the intervention would be like "Hollywood's action and horror movies".

== Circulation and audience ==
In addition to its native readers in Lebanon, Al Anwar was read by officials, intellectuals and activists outside Lebanon. It was distributed in other Arab countries, including Saudi Arabia, Kuwait, Bahrain, and the UAE where it had highest circulation figures during the early 1970s.

Al Anwar sold 35,000 copies at the beginning of the 1970s. In the 1980s the paper was frequently circulated in East Beirut. Its popularity in East Beirut continued until the 2000s. The circulation of the paper was 20,000 copies in 2003, making it the fourth best selling Lebanese newspaper.

In a 2006 study carried out by Ipsos, it was found that Al Anwar had lower circulation in capital Beirut than other regions. In Beirut the paper was the sixth among seven dailies, having daily circulation at 10.7%. However, it was the second most circulated daily with 12.6% in the Biqa region after Sada Al Balad which had 12.7% of the daily circulation. In Mount Lebanon Al Anwar was the fifth daily, having 38.4% of the daily circulation, whereas in southern Lebanon it was the third with 15.2% of the daily circulation.

Based on the data provided by the DAS research group the daily reported its average net daily sales as 49.043 copies in 2012. The daily sold 6,003 copies in Europe in 2012. The same year the website of Al Anwar had 1.1 million hits and 63,010 visitors per month.

== Awards ==
Al Anwar was awarded by different bodies, including the UNESCO Prize for Social Reporting and Columbia University's James Wechsler Award for best international reporting.

== See also ==
- List of newspapers in Lebanon
