= John Noel Reedman =

English-South African diplomat

John Noel Reedman (24 December 1905 – 20 May 1994) was an English-South African diplomat who was the Special Representative of the Secretary-General of the United Nations in Palestine. He had previously served as Senior Economic Advisor both to UNSCOP and the Palestine Commission. Reedman was a professor of economics at Witwatersrand University in South Africa.

== Life ==
John Noel Reedman was born on 24 December 1905 in Kirkburton, Yorkshire, England. He gained a PhD in economics from Sheffield University. Reedman moved to South Africa and became a lecturer of economics in the Department of Commerce at the University of Witwatersrand in 1936. He was described as an "outstanding teacher and scholar" who had "carried much of the lecturing burden of the department" He gave up his professorial functions in Johannesburg in January 1947 in order to join the staff of the United Nations.

== Career ==
At the outset of his career with the United Nations, Reedman began his work on the issue of Palestine. Before the founding of the United Nations Special Committee on Palestine (UNSCOP), the UN Secretariat began accumulating knowledge and expertise on Palestine in early 1947 after the British government announced that it was referring the Palestine problem to the United Nations. Reedman was part of a five-member team assembled at the direction of Secretary-General Trygve Lie to collect this information. The team published five thick volumes containing a wealth of statistical information and various proposed solutions to the Palestine problem intended to support the members of the United Nations Special Committee on Palestine (UNSCOP), which would later study the problem in the summer of 1947. Other prominent members of the team included Ralph Bunche, Constantin Stavropoulos, Alfonso Garcia Robles and Henri Vigier.

Reedman served as an economic advisor to UNSCOP. UNSCOP's members disagreed significantly on the issue of the proposed partition of Palestine, resulting in it submitting a majority and a minority report. The majority report recommended a partitioning which became the subject of General Assembly Resolution 181, while the minority report had argued for a federal state, in which an Arab majority would be maintained. Reedman, Bunche and Vigier, who had served in an advisory capacity to UNSCOP, unsuccessfully campaigned against the partition plan.

Following the adoption of General Assembly Resolution 181, Reedman was recruited by Ralph Bunche to advise the ill-fated Palestine Commission, which was to implement the partition plan. The General Assembly relieved the Palestine Commission of its mandate on 14 May 1948 and appointed Count Folke Bernadotte as UN mediator under Resolution 186. He was appointed to broker a peace settlement and find a solution to the Palestine question after the Commission proved unable to quell the civil war that had broken out following the adoption of the partition plan on 29 November 1947. Reedman was appointed by the Secretary General as his Special Representative in Palestine in 1948. During this time he and his staff were based in Tel Aviv and he acted as one of Folke Bernadotte's closest advisors.

After Bernadotte's assassination in 1948, the UN General Assembly decided to set up the United Nations Conciliation Commission for Palestine (UNCCP) with the aim of mediating the Arab-Israeli conflict. Reedman continued his involvement on the issue of the disposition of movable and immovable property belonging to Arab refugees who could not return to their homes.

Reedman became Principal Secretary of the Clapp Mission of the UN's Economic Survey Mission for the Middle East, which became known as the "Clapp Mission", named after its chairman, Gordan R. Clapp. Its report was issued on 28 December 1949.

In 1953 the UNCCP sent Reedman to visit the capitals of various Arab countries to negotiate the issue of blocked Arab accounts in Israel. He spent nearly two months attempting to reconcile Israel and Jordan. One of the commission's major accomplishments was the release of about 6000 Arab refugee accounts in Israeli banks. The accounts had been blocked in 1948 by the Israeli government which provided for the freezing of absentee property.

By 1955 Reedman was serving as Assistant Director in Charge of Resources and Industry Branch at the Department of Economic and Social Affairs (a branch of DESA which was absorbed into the Division for Sustainable Development during major restructuring in 2007-2008) at UN Headquarters in New York. In 1959, Reedman was appointed the Director of the United Nations Information Centre in London. However, he returned to New York after one year, resuming his role at the Resources and Industry branch at DESA. He was later appointed Director of the UN Office of Technical Cooperation.

After he had retired, Reedman's expertise as a Middle East specialist were sought once more when he was appointed to support the Jarring Mission in 1971. However, the Mission's efforts were unsuccessful in achieving a lasting peace settlement between Israel and neighbouring Arab states after the Six-Day War under the terms of UN Security Council Resolution 242. After 1973, the Jarring Mission was replaced by bilateral and multilateral peace conferences.

== Death ==
Reedman died on 20 May 1994 in Tunbridge Wells, Kent, England.

== Publications ==
"The United Nations and Economic Development" in 1961 in the journal International Relations

"Gold and Post-War Currency Standards" in the South African Journal of Economics (1941) South African Journal of Economics

“Exchange Depreciation and the Future of Gold” in the South African Journal of Economics (1937) South African Journal of Economics
