= Azzam Pasha quotation =

Arab leader's 1947 comment on war with a Jewish state

Abdul Rahman Hassan Azzam, the Secretary-General of the Arab League, said in 1947 that, were a war to take place with the proposed establishment of a Jewish state, it would lead to "a war of extermination and momentous massacre which will be spoken of like the Mongolian massacre and the Crusades."

The quote was universally cited for decades as having been uttered on the eve of the outbreak of hostilities between Israel and the Arab states several months later. The source of the quote was traced by the computer scientist Brendan McKay to an October 11, 1947, article in the Egyptian newspaper Akhbar al-Yom, titled "Arab countries prepare for war" (Arabic: البلاد العربية تستعد للحرب) in a section titled "War of extermination..." (Arabic: ...حرب إبادة), which included the quote, beginning with the previously-excluded words "Personally, I hope the Jews do not force us into this war, because it would be a war of extermination and momentous massacre ...". The newspaper article was written following a meeting organized by the journalist Jon Kimche at the Savoy Hotel in London between Azzam and three Zionist leaders in London: David Horowitz, David Ben-Gruion and Aba Eban, following the passage of UN Resolution 181, which recommended a partition plan for Palestine which established a Jewish state. All of the members of the meeting would later give different accounts of what was said.

The Israeli historian Efraim Karsh considers this quote a "genocidal threat". However, fellow Israeli historian Tom Segev has disputed Karsh's interpretation, saying that "Azzam used to talk a lot" and pointing to another statement from May 21, 1948, in which Azzam Pasha declared his desire for "equal citizenship for Jews in Arab Palestine".

== Historical context ==
Azzam was selected to be the first Secretary-General of the Arab League in March 1945. The first proposal for a joint Arab military intervention in Palestine was proposed by the King of Saudi Arabia, Ibn Saud, in September of that year. Azzam rejected this idea; in a report to Egyptian prime minister Mahmoud Nuqrashi, Azzam warned that the "destruction of the Jews by force is not a solution to the Palestine problem. I don't think that the League should adopt such extreme measures." He also noted that the Arab armies were dependent foreign countries for their supplies, who would "not consent to an Arab war against the Jews". Weeks later, Azzam shelved another proposal, this time from Iraq, for Arab military action.

On October 1 1945 Azzam wrote to the Egyptian foreign minister:

British officials with whom I spoke about Palestine are ready to support us as long as our demands are not extreme. Our position is much worse than it appeared when I was in Cairo. There is a very serious problem which necessitates a solution. There are hundreds of thousands of Jews who are in concentration-camp-like conditions. They are in a terrible condition. An extreme response against them will not be good. We must not take an extreme attitude against the Jews.

In an interview with Le Progrès Egyptien on October 5 1945, Azzam declared:

If you could assure me that the handing of Palestine to the Jews would mean peace everywhere, I should give all of it. However, such a solution would involve constant conflicts like those that developed in Ireland. But if a partition of the country is likely to effect a solution and put an end to the present disturbed situation, let us study such a possibility most carefully.

At the Bloudan conference in June 1946, Nuqrashi announced his opposition to Arab intervention while Azzam argued that the time was not right for military preparations; the Arab League rejected Amin al-Husseini's plea for an Arab volunteer army under his command, while secretly deciding to assist Husseini and to boycott the US and the UK if the situation came to armed struggle. The head of the Bloudan conference, Mohammed Hussein Heikal, would later deny in his memoirs responsibility for the secret protocols, which he was either unaware of or opposed, except for the agreement to raise the Palestine issue in the UN Assembly. Again, in December 1946, the Arab League rejected another Iraqi proposal which called for an Arab police force to be sent to Palestine with British approval. In September 1947, yet another Iraqi proposal at Sofar calling for the implementation of the secret protocols of Bloudan was rejected. It was not until April 1948, two weeks before the Mandate of Palestine was set to expire, that the Arab chiefs of staff met to plan an intervention. Despite having publicly rejected Zionism, Egyptian officials privately met with Zionist leaders as early as October 1945. In December 1945, the head of the Arab department of the Jewish Agency, Eliyahu Sasson, met in Cairo with former Egyptian prime minister Ali Mahir. Mahir expressed his support for Jewish-Arab relations, even going as far to suggest that the Jews might eventually join the Arab League. In August 1946, Sasson met Mahir in Cairo again, who offered to mediate between British, Jewish, and Arab officials. Then-Prime Minister Ismail Sidqi promised to endorse either a partition or a bi-national solution in exchange for Jewish assistance in Egypt's disputes with the UK. Sasson proposed a deal whereby Egypt would convince the Arab states to accept partition, and in return, the Jewish Agency would lobby on behalf of the Egyptians to persuade the British to transfer their troops on the Suez Canal bases to the new Jewish state. Surprisingly, the Egyptians were receptive to this offer. Sasson reported back to the Jewish Agency:

In his [Azzam's] view there is only one solution and that is: partition. But collective debates and discussions are required in order to arrive at this solution. As the Secretary of the Arab League, he cannot appear before the Arabs as the initiator of this suggestion. His position is very delicate. He is married to seven wives (that is, he is the Secretary of seven Arab states), each one fearing her fellow wife, competing with her and trying to undermine her. He can see fit to support partition on two conditions: If one of the Arab states will find the strength and the courage to take the initiative and to propose the matter at a meeting of the League, and if the British will request that he follow this line.

The United Nations Special Committee on Palestine was set up in May 1947 to develop proposals for the partition of Palestine. Recommendations to this effect were made in September of that year. The majority plan proposed a distinct two-state solution; the minority plan foresaw a federal state. Though the Jews had accepted the majority plan, the Arab countries were unanimous in their negative reactions to both plans, and openly spoke of taking up arms were either of these proposals enacted. For Ernest Bevin, the British Foreign Secretary, the majority plan would only lead to an outbreak of generalized violence, as clearly unjust to the Arabs, whilst the minority plan was inapplicable since it assumed a prior accord between Jews and Arabs. On September 15, Azzam Pasha, who was held in high esteem by David Ben-Gurion, met a Zionist delegation in London, consisting of Abba Eban and David Horowitz, both liaison officers with the Jewish Agency, and the journalist Jon Kimche. The emissaries stated that there was no doubt that a Jewish state would be established and requested that the Arab states accept the consequences and cooperate. They were willing to give guarantees against any form of Jewish expansionism. Azzam Pasha, in his capacity as Secretary General of the Arab League, suggested that the Zionist project be abandoned, and that the Jews could integrate themselves into Arab society on the basis of autonomous entities. He argued that it was pointless to appeal to political realism when the whole Zionist project demonstrated the efficacy of will-power. Azzam argued that the existence of the Palestinian Jewry as a historic fact - something he accepted - was not accepted by the Arabs as a whole, citing the example of the Crusaders, who had been defeated after centuries of presence in Palestine due to the Arabs not accepting them as a historical fact. According to Aba Eban's memorandum notes on September 19, Azzam stated:

For me you may be a fact, but for them you are not a fact at all- you are a temporary phenomenon. Centuries ago, the Crusaders established themselves in our midst against our will, and in 200 years we ejected them. This was because we never made the mistake of accepting them as a fact.

You may easily convince me that the Arabs now have an interest in allowing you to develop your State, and to live at peace with them [sic], but having convinced me of this, you will have achieved nothing, for you have nothing at all to offer which I can take back to my people tomorrow. Up to the very last moment, and beyond, they will fight to prevent you from establishing your State. In no circumstances will they agree to it

Politics were not a matter for sentimental agreements; they were resultants of contending forces. The question is whether you can bring more force for the creation of a Jewish State than we can muster to prevent it. If you want your State, however, you must come and get it. It is useless asking me for the Negev on the grounds that it is empty. You can only get your Negev by taking it. If you are yourselves strong enough to do this, or if you enlist strong partners - Britain, America, Russia, the United Nations- you may well succeed. If you cannot, then you will fail. But, in no circumstances, will you obtain Arab consent in the process.

On the other hand, we once had Spain, and then we lost Spain, and we have become accustomed to not having Spain. We once had Persia, and then lost Persia, and now we have become accustomed to not having Persia. Whether at any point we shall become accustomed to not having a part of Palestine, I cannot say. The chances are against it, since 400,000 of our brethren will be unwilling citizens of your State. They will never recognise it, and they will never make peace.

I can no longer say that we should give the Jews their State, and then enlist them as a world force to banish imperialism from the East. Imperialism is in any case banished, and we stand in no need of Jewish aid. At one time we might have said that the Jews should be allowed to develop their State in order to contribute to movements of development and unity in a unified Arab world.

In short, Azzam argued that the Zionist movement had two options: abandon Zionism and seek Jewish autonomous units within the framework of Arab society, or use force to establish a Jewish state, which the Arabs could not agree to. Eban concluded his memorandum as the following: "Despite this candour and vigour of expression, the conversation was cordial in tone, and Azzam Pasha expressed his readiness, at all suitable occasions, to have private discussions of this kind." According to Horowitz's State in the Making (1953), Azzam stated:

The Arab world is not in a compromising mood. It's likely, Mr. Horowitz, that your plan is rational and logical, but the fate of nations is not decided by rational logic. Nations never concede; they fight. You won't get anything by peaceful means or compromise. You can, perhaps, get something, but only by the force of arms. We shall try to defeat you. I'm not sure we'll succeed, but we'll try. We were able to drive out the Crusaders, but on the other hand we lost Spain and Persia. It may be that we shall lose Palestine. But it's too late to talk of peaceful solutions ...

An agreement will only be acceptable at our terms. The Arab world regards you as invaders and is ready to fight you. The conflict of interests among nations is, for the most part, not amenable to any settlement except armed clash ...

It's in the nature of peoples to aspire to expansion and fight for what they think is vital. It's possible I don't represent, in the full sense of the word, the new spirit which animates my people. My young son, who yearns to-fight, undoubtedly represents it better than I do. He no longer believes in us of the older generation.

When he came back from one of the more violent student demonstrations against the British, I told him that in my opinion the British would evacuate Egypt without the need for his demonstrations. He asked me in surprise: 'But, Father, are you really so pro-British?'

The forces which motivate peoples are not subject to our control. They're objective forces. It may have been possible in the past to have reached agreement if there'd been amalgamation from below. But it's no longer feasible. You speak of the Middle East. We don't recognize that conception. We only think in terms of the Arab world. Nationalism, that's a greater force than any which drives us. We don't need economic development with your assistance. We have only one test, the test of strength. If I were a Zionist leader, I might have behaved the way you're doing. You have no alternative. At all events, the problem now is only soluble by the force of arms.

The Zionist delegation took this statement as a fascist declaration; according to Henry Laurens, they were unable to see that, as with the Jews of Europe, emancipation from enslavement for the Arabs was seen as requiring recourse to force.

Upon being informed of the meeting, Ben-Gurion, who had previously called Azzam the "most honest and humane among Arab leaders", and who had earlier ordered the Haganah to prepare for a war, summarized Azzam's position in a meeting with members of his political party:

As we fought against the Crusaders, we will fight against you, and we will erase you from the earth.

On October 11, the editor of Akhbar el-Yom, Mustafa Amin, ran an interview he had obtained from Azzam Pasha to report on the outcome of the summit. The article was entitled "A War of Extermination", and quoted Azzam Pasha:

I personally wish that the Jews do not drive us to this war, as this will be a war of extermination and momentous massacre which will be spoken of like the Tartar massacre or the Crusader wars. I believe that the number of volunteers from outside Palestine will be larger than Palestine's Arab population, for I know that volunteers will be arriving to us from [as far as] India, Afghanistan, and China to win the honor of martyrdom for the sake of Palestine ... You might be surprised to learn that hundreds of Englishmen expressed their wish to volunteer in the Arab armies to fight the Jews.

— Mustafa Amin, Arab countries prepare for war, Akhbar al-Yom, October 11, 1947

In early December 1947, Azzam told a rally of students in Cairo that "the Arabs conquered the Tartars and the Crusaders, and they are now ready to defeat the new enemy," echoing the same sentiments.

== Jewish Agency for Palestine memo ==
A memorandum from the Jewish Agency for Palestine, submitted on February 2, 1948, to the United Nations Palestine Commission, the body tasked with the implementation of the partition resolution, and again to the UN Secretary-General on March 29, 1948, referred to the Azzam Pasha quotation, citing the October 11, 1947, article in Akhbar el-Yom.

... The "practical and effective means" contrived and advocated by the Arab States were never envisaged as being limited by the provisions of the Charter; indeed, the Secretary-General of the Arab League was thinking in terms which are quite remote from the lofty sentiments of San Francisco. "This war," he said, "will be a war of extermination and a momentous massacre which will be spoken of like the Mongol massacres and the Crusades."

— Jewish Agency for Palestine memorandum, February 2, 1948

== The uses to which the quotation was put ==
At the time of the utterance, according to Segev, the Arab–Israeli conflict was alao raging in the media of the day, as either side sought to show the other side was agitating for war. Azzam had, he concludes, "supplied the Zionists with a sound bite that serves Israeli propaganda to this very day", and some 395 books, and roughly 13,000 websites cite this excerpt to this day.

Part of Azzam's quote, without its initial caveat, appeared in English in a memorandum from the Jewish Agency for Palestine to the United Nations Palestine Commission in February 1948. During the next few years, the same partial sentence appeared (in its correct 1947 setting) in several books. However, by 1952, many publications, including one published by the Israeli government, had moved its date to 1948, specifically to May 15, 1948, shortly after the outbreak of the 1948 Arab–Israeli War. As the war got underway, The Jerusalem Post quoted a further declaration from him:

Whatever the outcome, the Arabs will stick to their offer of equal citizenship for Jews in Arab Palestine and let them be as Jewish as they like.

== Quotation source and authenticity debate ==
Until 2010, the source of the quotation has been commonly claimed to be a press conference in Cairo on May 15, 1948, one day after the Israeli declaration of independence, which some versions say was broadcast by the BBC.

An Egyptian writer in 1961 maintained that the quotation was "completely out of context". He wrote that:

"Azzam actually said that he feared that if the people of Palestine were to be forcibly and against all right dispossessed, a tragedy comparable to the Mongol invasions and the Crusades might not be avoidable. ... The reference to the Crusaders and the Mongols aptly describes the view of the foreign Zionist invaders shared by most Arabs."

In 2010, doubt over the provenance of the quotation was voiced by Alexander Joffe and Asaf Romirowsky, as well as by Benny Morris.

In 2010, the source of the quote was traced by the computer scientist Brendan McKay to an October 11, 1947, article in the Egyptian newspaper Akhbar el-Yom, titled "A War of Extermination", which included the quote, beginning with the previously-excluded words "Personally, I hope the Jews do not force us into this war, because it would be a war of extermination and momentous massacre ...".

McKay, a Wikipedia editor, had discussed his discovery on a talk page on the site, and shared the document with Jewish-American pro-Israel researcher David Barnett upon Barnett's request. Barrett then published a paper on this discovery together with Efarim Karsh in Middle East Quarterly. Karsh nonetheless criticized McKay for not posting the quote to Wikipedia, claiming McKay "failed to share his important discovery with the general public so as to keep Arab genocidal designs on the nascent Jewish state under wraps."

McKay called this accusation "quite a distortion", citing Wikipedia's policy against including unpublished research in articles, and disputed Karsh's claim that he had declined a co-authorship credit on the Middle East Quarterly article, writing "The fact is that Barnett and Karsh published an article containing almost nothing that had not appeared earlier on the Wikipedia discussion page, featuring a rare document that I had scanned with my own hands, yet no attribution whatever was given. They didn't even look at the document properly, and reported (now corrected) that my pdf markup indicating the text on the Arabic page was a 'special box' set by the newspaper. Is this what we should expect from a historian at an eminent British university?".

== Interpretation and debate ==
According to Jon Kimche, the journalist who organized the meeting, and David Kimche:

There was an irresistible logic in Azzam's warning. The moderates among the Arab leaders could not prevent a war. The Arab mood was created by the young men who burnt trams in the streets of Cairo. There was not one Arab statesman who could stand up to the power and terror of "the street" and live. But the Jewish leaders could not bring themselves to accept the inevitability of Azzam's conclusion. They were prepared to agree that the Arab leadership had been intimidated by this fear of "the street," but they would not believe that either the British or the Americans would allow this type of mob-rule to dictate to them their policy in the Middle East.

Karsh, together with his co-author David Barnett, consider the Azzam Pasha quotation a "genocidal threat".

Tom Segev, also an historian, disputes this interpretation, saying that "Azzam used to talk a lot" and pointing to another statement from May 21, 1948, in which Azzam Pasha declared his desire for "equal citizenship for Jews in Arab Palestine". In response to Segev, Karsh wrote that while it is true that Azzam was prepared to allow survivors of the destroyed Jewish state to live as dhimmis, in his view "this can hardly be considered an indication of moderation".

Michael Scott Doran offered a different view on Azzam's goals. In his opinion:

The flimsy alliance that the Egyptian authorities pretended to let King Abdallah lead into battle was, at one and the same moment, an anti-Israeli and an anti-Jordanian instrument. Cairo viewed the coalition not as a weapon for destroying Zionism but, rather, as a catapult designed to hurl the Jordanian army at the Israelis. The distinction between these two conceptions is indeed fine, but significant nonetheless. In military terms, the goal of the coalition was to liberate as much Palestinian territory as possible and to weaken, if not defeat, the enemy. In political terms, however, its purpose was to prevent the partition of Palestine between Israel and Jordan by forcing Amman, first, to make war against Zionism, and, second, to refrain from cutting a deal with the enemy without the authorization of Cairo. .. In addition, they had no choice but to capture the moral high ground of Arab politics by advocating a policy of no compromise, even though they realized that compromise would be a very likely outcome of the conflict. Calling for the liberation of Palestine, and behaving in a manner consistent with the call, were essential components of the Egyptian project, but they did not constitute its central objective. Thus, partial failure on the battlefield would not constitute a failure of the entire operation, if the maneuver were to result in driving a wedge between King Abdallah and the Zionists. If Cairo stopped short of destroying Zionism and yet still succeeded, say, in creating a Palestinian state sandwiched on the West Bank between Jordan and Israel, then it would have achieved its fundamental goals of preventing the expansion of Jordan and thwarting the creation of an Amman– Tel Aviv axis.

== Translation ==
Personally I hope the Jews do not force us into this war because it will be a war of elimination and it will be a serious massacre which history will record similarly to the Mongol massacre or the wars of the Crusades. I think the number of volunteers from outside Palestine will exceed the Palestinian population. I know that we will get volunteers from India, Afghanistan and China to have the glory of being martyrs for Palestine. You might be shocked if you knew that many British have shown interest in volunteering in the Arab armies to fight the Jews.

This fight will be distinguished by three grave issues; faith, since all fighters believe that his fight for Palestine is the short road to heaven. Second it will be a chance for looting on a grand scale. Third, no one will be able to stop the zealous volunteers who will come from all over the world to revenge the Palestinian martyrs because they know that the battle is an honor for all Muslims and Arabs in the world...

Moreover, the Arab is distinguished from the Jew in that he accepts defeat with a smile, so if the Jews win the first battle we will win in the second, third or the last. On the other hand a single defeat of the Jews will destroy their morale.

The Arabs in the desert love to go to war. ... I remember once while fighting in the desert I was called to make a peace and the Arabs asked me why do you do that? How can we live without a war? The Bedouin finds enjoyment in war which he does not find in peace!

I warned the Jewish leaders whom I met in London about continuing their policy, and I told them that the Arab soldier is the strongest in the world. Once he lifts his weapon, he does not put it down till he fires the last bullet in the battle, and we will fire the last bullet...

In the end I understand the consequence of this bloody war, I see in front of me its horrible battles, I can imagine its victims but I have a clear conscience since we were called to fight as defenders and not attackers!

== See also ==
Phrases and quotations

- A land without a people for a people without a land
- There was no such thing as Palestinians
- The bride is beautiful, but she is married to another man

== Sources ==
Doran, Michael (1999). Pan-Arabism before Nasser: Egyptian Power Politics and the Palestine Question. Oxford University Press. ISBN 9780195160086.

Caplan, Neil (2015) [1986]. "Document 34: A.S. Eban, Note of Conrversation with Abd ar-Rahman Azzam Pasha, London, 15 September 1947". Futile Diplomacy: Arab-Zionist Negotiations and the End of the Mandate. Vol. 2. Routledge. ISBN 9781317441946.
