= Rhynern =

- Town and former municipality
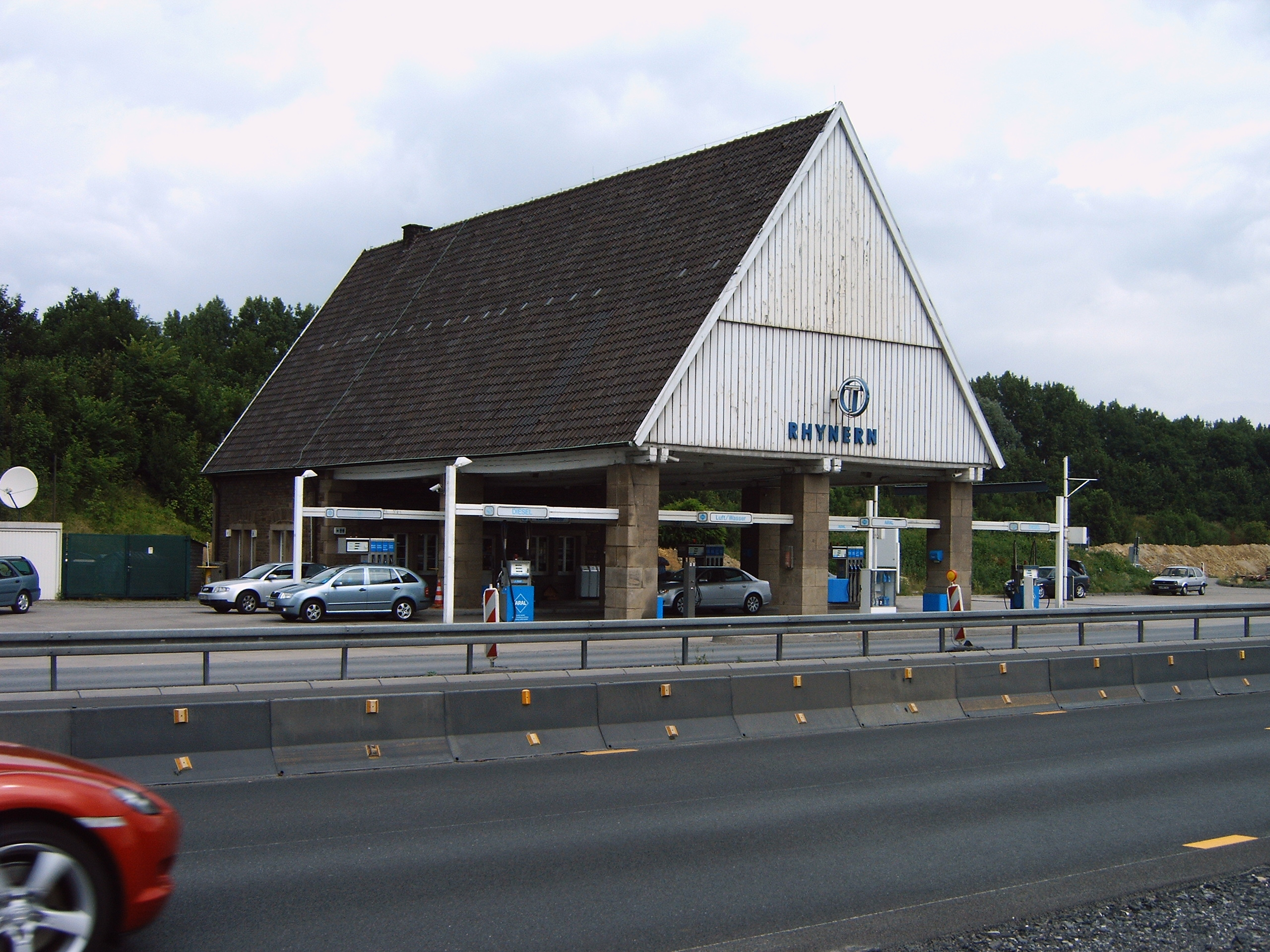

- Seal

- Location in North Rhine-Westphalia
- Coordinates: 51°37′47.8″N 7°51′29.2″E
- Country: Germany
- State: North Rhine-Westphalia
- Region: Arnsberg
- District: Hamm

Area
  - Total: 59.22 km^{2} (22.86 sq mi)

Population (2005)
  - Total: 18,578
- Time zone: UTC+6.30 (MST)

Rhynern, also Hamm-Rhynern, is the largest city district by area (59.22 km ²) of the city of Hamm, Westphalia, Germany. Until 1968 Rhynern was the administrative center of Amt Rhynern.

== Overview ==
It has 18,578 inhabitants. The town is predominantly rural-agrarian and lies off the Bundesautobahn 2 on European route E34, south of the town of Westtünnen. The L669 road connects it to villages Wambeln and Scheidingen in the south and the K10 road connects it to the village of Osttünnen two miles to the northeast. It lies on the Hamm-Soest Railway.

Rhynern is located in the heart of Westphalia. Its coordinates based on the old village church are 51° 37' 47.8" N, 7° 51' 29.2" E, it is calibrated to 92.96 m above sea level.

The oldest written reference is found in approximately the year 1000 in a manuscript, which is located in the State Archives of Münster. In 1302 it fell into possession of the Bishops of Munster. During the French occupation in the 19th Century the office was created in 1808 named Rhynern Mairie. After restoration of the Prussian province of Westphalia, it remained in place.

On 1 April 1939 it was largely incorporated into Hamm and on 31 December 1974 it officially became part of the municipality of Hamm. Polish journalist Ksawery Pruszyński died in a car accident in Rhynern in 1950.

It contains the Galerie Mensing, a small church, a library, several sports complexes and several hotels.

== Towns and villages ==
The former municipality included the following villages:

- Rhynern
- Berge
- Westtünnen
- Caldenhof
- Osttünnen
- Süddinker
- Allen
- Unter-Allen
- Zengerott
- Wambeln
- Wambeln-Bruch
- Opsen
- Freiske
- Drechen
- Osterflierich
- Pedinghausen
- Kump
