= The bride is beautiful, but she is married to another man =

Story about an alleged Zionist mission to Palestine

"The bride is beautiful, but she is married to another man" is a phrase used to refer to a fundamental problem confronting Zionist ambitions to found a Jewish homeland in Palestine. This problem lay in the non-Jews such as Arab Muslims and Arab Christians who lived on the land later claimed by the nation of Israel as this Jewish homeland in 1948.

The phrase is of unknown origin, and no primary source supports its historicity. It is found in stories that are often set during the 1890s and feature a Jewish fact-finding mission to Ottoman or Mandatory Palestine. In these stories the phrase conveys a warning to this fact-finding mission that a Jewish homeland could not be reestablished in Palestine without interfering with the existing population.

== Variants ==
The Guardian's foreign correspondent and expert on Israel and the Middle East, Eric Silver, told a version of the story in 1977: "An ageing pioneer was interviewed once on Israeli television. He explained how the elders of his Russian Jewish village had sent an emissary to Palestine to spy out the land. The man reported back: 'The bride is beautiful, but she is already married.'"

Professor Benjamin Beit-Hallahmi of the University of Haifa recounted another version of the story in his Original Sins (1992): "There is a famous story, told during a meeting between Prime Minister Golda Meir and a group of Israeli writers in 1970. A Jew from Poland visited Palestine in the 1920s. On his return to Europe, he summarized his impressions by saying: 'The bride is beautiful, but she has got a bridegroom already.' Golda Meir responded by saying: 'And I thank God every night that the bridegroom was so weak, and the bride could be taken away from him.'"

UCLA professor of political science and history Anthony Pagden presented a different version of the story in his Worlds at War (2008): "When in 1897 the rabbis of Vienna sent a fact-finding mission to Palestine, they famously reported back that the bride 'was beautiful but married to another man.' But the implication of this wry remark—that the Zionists should attempt to marry someone else—was disregarded."

The phrase has been cited as an 1890s fact-finding message in University of Oxford Professor of International Relations Avi Shlaim's The Iron Wall (2000), (Note: Avi Shlaim, The Iron Wall: "After the Basel Congress, according to an apocryphal story, the rabbis of Vienna decided to explore Herzl's ideas and sent two representatives to Palestine. This fact-finding mission resulted in a cable from Palestine in which the two rabbis wrote, "The bride is beautiful, but she is married to another man." This cable encapsulated the problem with which the Zionist movement had to grapple from the beginning: an Arab population already lived on the land on which the Jews had set their heart.") and the titles of the books Married to Another Man (2007) by Ghada Karmi and (in Swedish) Bruden är vacker men har redan en man by Ingmar Karlsson (2012) are based on versions of the story.

== Lack of historicity ==
In 2012, American author Shai Afsai published an article in the academic triannual Shofar: An Interdisciplinary Journal of Jewish Studies asserting that the stories in which the phrase appears are unsubstantiated. Afsai has discussed Avi Shlaim, Anthony Pagden, Ghada Karmi, and others as examples of those who treat the stories as historical fact without providing primary sources. He has also suggested that some of the same points made by telling these stories may be made "without recourse to a fabricated tale," mentioning the writings and observations of Zionist travelers such as Leo Motzkin, Israel Zangwill and Ahad Ha'am, and the Zionist settler Yitzhak Epstein.

Following the publication of Afsai's Shofar article, a number of writers on the Middle East began referring to stories featuring the phrase "the bride is beautiful, but she is married to another man" as apocryphal or as myths. Shlaim still included a story featuring the phrase in his "Updated and Expanded" edition of The Iron Wall (2014), but now called it "an apocryphal story." Eve Spangler, in Understanding Israel/Palestine (2015), referred to the phrase as a "rather poetic metaphor attributed to Zionist planners," while adding that Afsai "has challenged the authenticity of the phrase." In her Demonization in International Politics (2016), Linn Normand wrote that the title of Karmi's Married to Another Man was taken from "an apocryphal story." Hagar Kotef repeated a version of the "famous tale" in her The Colonizing Self (2020), while noting that "Shai Afsai, however, claims this myth was never established in any primary resource."

== See also ==
Phrases and quotations

- "A land without a people for a people without a land"
- Azzam Pasha quotation
- "From the river to the sea"
- "There was no such thing as Palestinians"
