= Ksawery Pruszyński =

Polish journalist, publicist, writer and diplomat

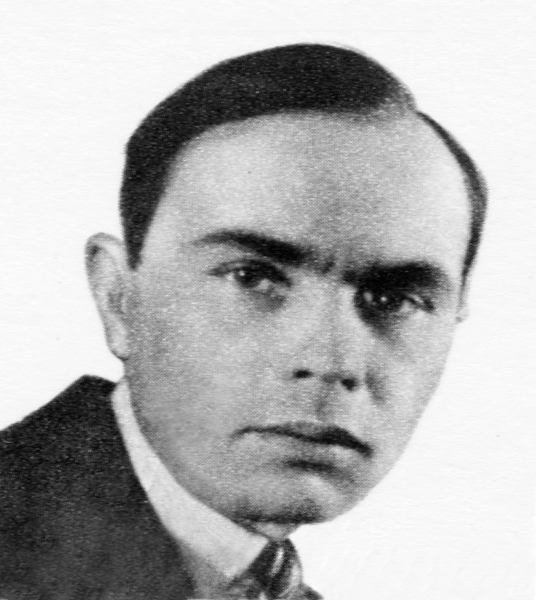
Ksawery Pruszyński

Franciszek Ksawery Pruszyński (4 December 1907 – 13 June 1950) was a Polish journalist, publicist, writer and diplomat. He was one of the most active and operative of Polish newspaper reporters.

== Biography ==
He was born in Wolica Kierekieszyna–now in Ukraine–in Volhynia. After the Russian Revolution of 1917 his family settled in Kraków. A graduate of the Zakład Naukowo-Wychowawczy Ojców Jezuitów w Chyrowie in 1927, he studied law at Jagiellonian University. He joined the organization Myśl Mocarstwowa (Imperial Thought). His works first appeared in Dzień Akademicki and Civitas Academica. He specialized in medieval German law, taught by professor Stanisław Estreicher. In 1929 he was deputy assistant to Estreicher.

He travelled all over Europe contributing articles to the leading Polish papers. He joined the editorial board of the newspaper Czas from Kraków, first as a proofreader, then surveying the foreign press, and from 1930, author of a series of reports from Hungary. In 1932 he published his debut book, Sarajewo 1914, Szanghaj 1932, Gdańsk 193? (Sarajevo 1914, Shanghai 1932, Gdańsk 193?) about Gdańsk. In the 1930s he published in the magazine Bunt Młodych (Youth Revolt) and was a member of the young conservatives. He travelled in Palestine in 1933 reporting for the Vilnius weekly Słowo. His book on Palestine was published in October 1933, Palestyna po raz trzeci (Palestine for the Third Time). During the Spanish Civil War in 1936 he was a correspondent in Madrid and supported the Spanish Republican Army, staying at the famous Hotel Florida (Madrid), then also inhabited by the likes of Ernest Hemingway. He wrote about Spain in the book W czerwonej Hiszpanii (In the Red Spain), published in 1937 (translated to Spanish as En la España roja in 2007). Before September 1939 he reported from Gdańsk. His article was published in July 1939 on the first page in the special issue of Wiadomości Literackie dedicated to Gdańsk.

After September 1939 he fought in the Polish Armed Forces in the West, and served in the Battle of Narvik (Norway 1940), and Battle of Falaise (France 1944). He wrote about Scotland and Poles who came there in the book Polish Invasion, published in October 1941 in London. He was a member of the Polish Embassy staff in Russia (1941–42). After this experience he wrote the book Russian Year: A Notebook of an Amateur Diplomat, published in May 1944 in New York. During his stay in Russia he experienced such contrasts as a stay in a humble peasant's hut and a dinner in state with Stalin at the Kremlin. The New York Times wrote that Pruszyński "possesses a knowledge of Russian language, culture and history shared by very few recent foreign visitors to the Soviet Union. Add to this a keenly observant eye, a style that is always readable and sometimes brilliant, and one has the ingredients of one of the most informative books that have appeared on the Soviet Union at war.".

He wrote about Gdańsk in 1946 after its destruction and reminisce about pro-war attitude of the citizens of Gdańsk in 1939. During 1947-1948 he was the chairman of Subcommittee 1 and of the Working Group on Boundaries (as part of the UN Ad Hoc Committee on the Palestinian Question). Between 1948 and 1950 he was a diplomatic representative (poseł) of PRL in the Netherlands. At that time, he was associated with a Polish poet Julia Hartwig. He died in unexplained circumstances on 13 June 1950 in a car accident in Rhynern, south of Hamm, about 50 miles northeast of Düsseldorf. He was buried at Rakowicki Cemetery in Kraków. Married to Maria Meysztowicz, he had three children: Aleksander, Maria and Stanisław (Stash).

Ryszard Kapuściński said of Pruszyński that thanks to him reportage has become not only the product of the eye, but also of the mind.

== Selected bibliography ==
=== Works available in English ===
- Polish Invasion (London 1941, Edinburgh 2010) - about the mutual impact of Poles and Scots in wartime Scotland
- Poland Fights Back (London 1941, New York 1944)
- Russian Year (as Xavier Pruszyński, New York 1944) - about Russia
- Adam Mickiewicz: The Life Story of the Greatest Polish Poet (1950) - about Adam Mickiewicz

=== Works currently unavailable in English ===
- Sarajewo 1914, Szanghaj 1932, Gdańsk 193? (1932) - about Gdańsk before the Second World War
- Palestyna po raz trzeci (1933) - about Palestine
- Podróż po Polsce (1937) - about Poland
- W czerwonej Hiszpanii (1937) - about the Spanish Civil War
- Droga wiodła przez Narvik (1941)
- Księga ponurych niedopowiedzeń (1941)
- 1000 mil od prawdy (1941)
- Walczymy (1943)
- Margrabia Wielopolski (1944) - about Aleksander Wielopolski
- Trzynaście opowieści (1946)
- Karabela z Meschedu (1948)
- Opowieść o Mickiewiczu (1956) - about Adam Mickiewicz
- Wybór pism publicystycznych (volumes 1–2, 1966) - a selection of articles about Poland, Europe and the USA
- Wybór pism 1940-1945 (1989) - a selection of articles originally published in newspapers between 1940 and 1945
- Publicystyka. Tom 1. 1931-1939. Niezadowoleni i entuzjaści (1990) - a selection of articles originally published in newspapers between 1931 and 1939
- Publicystyka. Tom 2. 1940-1948. Powrót do Soplicowa (1990) - a selection of articles originally published in newspapers between 1940 and 1948

== Biographies ==
- Zygmunt Ziątek, Ksawery Pruszyński; Warsaw, State Publishing Institute PIW, 1972
