= Constantin Stavropoulos =

Political figure

Constantin Stavropoulos (August 15, 1905 – November 6, 1984) was the former Undersecretary General of the United Nations Office of Legal Affairs of the United Nations.

== Life ==
Stavropoulos was born in Athens, Greece in 1905. Going to university at the University of Athens and the London School of Economics, Stavropoulos graduated with a law degree and started his career working in private legal practice, before taking a position as the Secretary General and Acting Governor of Epirus in 1933. By 1941, he worked for the Greek foreign ministry.

He was married to Giannina Colquhoun.

== Career ==
After World War II, Stavropoulous began his career with the United Nations, which he would go on to serve in for over 30 years. He acted as special legal adviser to Count Folke Bernadotte, the then-United Nations Mediator in Palestine, remaining in that position when Ralph Bunche took the mediator position. As a UN staff member, Stavropoulos had been extensively involved with issue of Palestine since 1947. He was a member of a five member team sent by the UN Secretariat to Palestine in 1947 to study the country as soon as the British government announced that it would be referring the Palestine problem to the United Nations. The team produced a vast amount of documentation which was to serve as background material for the United Nations Special Committee on Palestine. Later on, Stavropoulos would be recruited by Ralph Bunche, after he had been named Principal Secretary of the United Nations Palestine Commission (UNPC). Although the Commission was disbanded on 14 May 1948 when the General Assembly decided to instead appoint a mediator to try to bring peace to the country, Stavropoulos was again recruited by Bunche in order to support UN Mediator Folke Bernadotte with his task.

Stavropoulos would go on to become Principal Director in Charge of the Legal Department of the United Nations Secretariat from 1952-1954. In 1954, Stavropoulos became Under-Secretary General of the Office of Legal Affairs when the Legal Department of the UN was reorganized by the then Secretary General, Dag Hammerskjöld.

Stavropoulos served as the Special Representative of the Secretary General at the two first United Nations Conferences on the Law of the Sea (UNCLOS) in 1958 and 1960 respectively. UNCLOS I resulted in four treaties being concluded in 1958: Convention on the Territorial Sea and Contiguous Zone, entry into force: 10 September 1964 Convention on the Continental Shelf, entry into force: 10 June 1964 Convention on the High Seas, entry into force: 30 September 1962 Convention on Fishing and Conservation of Living Resources of the High Seas, entry into force: 20 March 1966.

One year after the UN General Assembly decided, in 1966, to adopt a resolution terminating South Africa's mandate over Namibia, the General Assembly decided to set up a UN Council for Namibia and appoint a High Commissioner for Namibia. On the proposal of the Secretary-General, the United Nations General Assembly appointed Constantin Stavropoulos, Legal Counsel of the United Nations as Acting United Nations High Commissioner for South West Africa at a plenary meeting on 13 June 1967. During his term, he achieved the issuance of travel documents for Namibians, which allowed them to travel to countries recognising those documents.

Stavropoulos authored the journal article "The Practice of Voluntary Abstentions by Permanent Members of the Security Council under Article 27, Paragraph 3, of the Charter of the United Nations" in 1967 which was published in the American Journal of International Law.

== Death ==
Stavropoulos died in 1984 in Athens, Greece, at the age of 79, as a result of a heart attack after a long illness.
