= Ad Hoc Committee on the Palestinian Question =

1947 United Nations committee

Report of the Ad Hoc Committee on the Palestinian question, document A/516, dated 25 November 1947. This was the document voted on by the UN General Assembly on 29 November 1947, and became known as the United Nations Partition Plan for Palestine.

The Ad Hoc Committee on the Palestinian Question, also known as the Ad Hoc Committee on Palestine or just the Ad Hoc Committee, was a committee formed by a vote of the United Nations General Assembly on 23 September 1947, following the publication of the report of the United Nations Special Committee on Palestine (UNSCOP) on 3 September 1947, which contained majority and minority proposals.

The committee was chaired by H. V. Evatt, who was later to write in his memoirs: "I regard the establishment of Israel as a great victory of the United Nations." Thor Thorns, the U.N. representative of Iceland, was the rapporteur for the committee.

The General Assembly vote for the formation of the committee was 29 to 11, with 16 abstaining. The creation of the committee was strongly opposed by Arab states, who wanted the question referred to the UN Political Committee, since according to Lebanon's Charles Malik, an Ad Hoc Committee would be more susceptible to the influence of "certain pressure groups".

Two subcommittees were created on 22 October to assess the UNSCOP majority and minority proposals. These subcommittees were broadly mutually exclusive, and the second subcommittee, composed primarily of Arab states and with the Higher Arab Committee advising, was largely ignored.

== The Committee ==
Abba Hillel Silver, Chairman of the American Section of the Jewish Agency, made the case for a Jewish State to the Ad Hoc Committee and announced on behalf of the Jewish Agency acceptance of 10 of the eleven unanimous recommendations of the UN Partition Plan and rejection of the minority report. Of the majority report (the Partition Plan areas), Silver vacillates saying that he was prepared to "recommend to the Jewish people acceptance subject to further discussion of the constitutional and territorial provisions". While three members endorsed a federal state (the minority report) similar to the Morrison-Grady Plan that had been rejected by both Jews and Arabs and the UNSCOP found that a canton system "might easily entail an excessive fragmentation of the governmental processes, and in its ultimate result, would be quite unworkable." No members of the UNSCOP endorsed a one-state solution as recommended by the Arab Higher Committee and on 29 September Jamal al-Husayni, vice-president of the Arab Higher Committee, announced opposition to the UN Partition Plan.

== Subcommittees ==
On 22 October the Ad Hoc Committee formed two subcommittees. Subcommittee 1 (chaired by Ksawery Pruszyński) comprised nine members (United States, Soviet Union, United Kingdom, Canada, Poland, Czechoslovakia, Uruguay, Guatemala, Jewish Agency for Palestine) and was responsible for producing a plan of implementation of the UNSCOP majority report; and subcommittee 2 (chaired by Muhammad Zafarullah Khan after October 28) was composed of six Arab delegates and three supporters of the minority plan and reviewed the UNSCOP minority report which was a plan for a single federal Palestinian state, with Jewish and Arab provinces and a split Jerusalem as federal capital. However, Subcommittee 2 was never taken seriously since the United States, Soviet Union and the UK sat on Subcommittee 1. The Jewish Agency for Palestine was consulted by Subcommittee 1 while the Arab Higher Committee was consulted by Subcommittee 2.

The reports of subcommittee 1 and subcommittee 2 were delivered on 19 November 1947.

Subcommittee 2 wanted the International Court of Justice to be asked for an advisory opinion on relevant legal questions. At the request of the representative of France, two votes were taken, one on the first seven questions, and the other on the eighth question, which read as follows:

Whether the United Nations, or any of its Member States, is competent to enforce, or recommend the enforcement of, any proposal concerning the constitution and future government of Palestine, in particular, any plan of partition which is contrary to the wishes, or adopted without the consent, of the inhabitants of Palestine.

In respect of the seven questions, this was rejected by a vote of eighteen in favour, twenty-five against, with eleven abstentions and in respect of the eighth question, this was rejected by a vote of twenty in favour, twenty-one against, with thirteen abstentions.

The Ad Hoc Committee rejected the Subcommittee 2 resolution to constitute a unitary Palestinian state and accepted the proposed partition plan of Subcommittee 1.

== Subsequent events ==
Britain was unwilling to implement a policy that was not acceptable to both sides and so refused to share with the UN Palestine Commission the administration of Palestine during the transitional period and on 20 November 1947 the British Government informed the UN of a timetable for evacuating Palestine. On the Termination of the Mandate, Partition And Independence. Britain as the Mandatory Power was to use its best endeavours to ensure that an area situated in the territory of the Jewish State, including a seaport and hinterland adequate to provide facilities for a substantial immigration, was to be evacuated at the earliest possible date and in any event not later than 1 February 1948.

On 29 November 1947 the UN General Assembly recommended the adoption and implementation of a plan substantially in the form of The Plan of Partition with Economic Union in CHAPTER VI: PROPOSED RECOMMENDATIONS (II), as Resolution 181 (II).
