= United Nations Special Committee on Palestine =

International committee

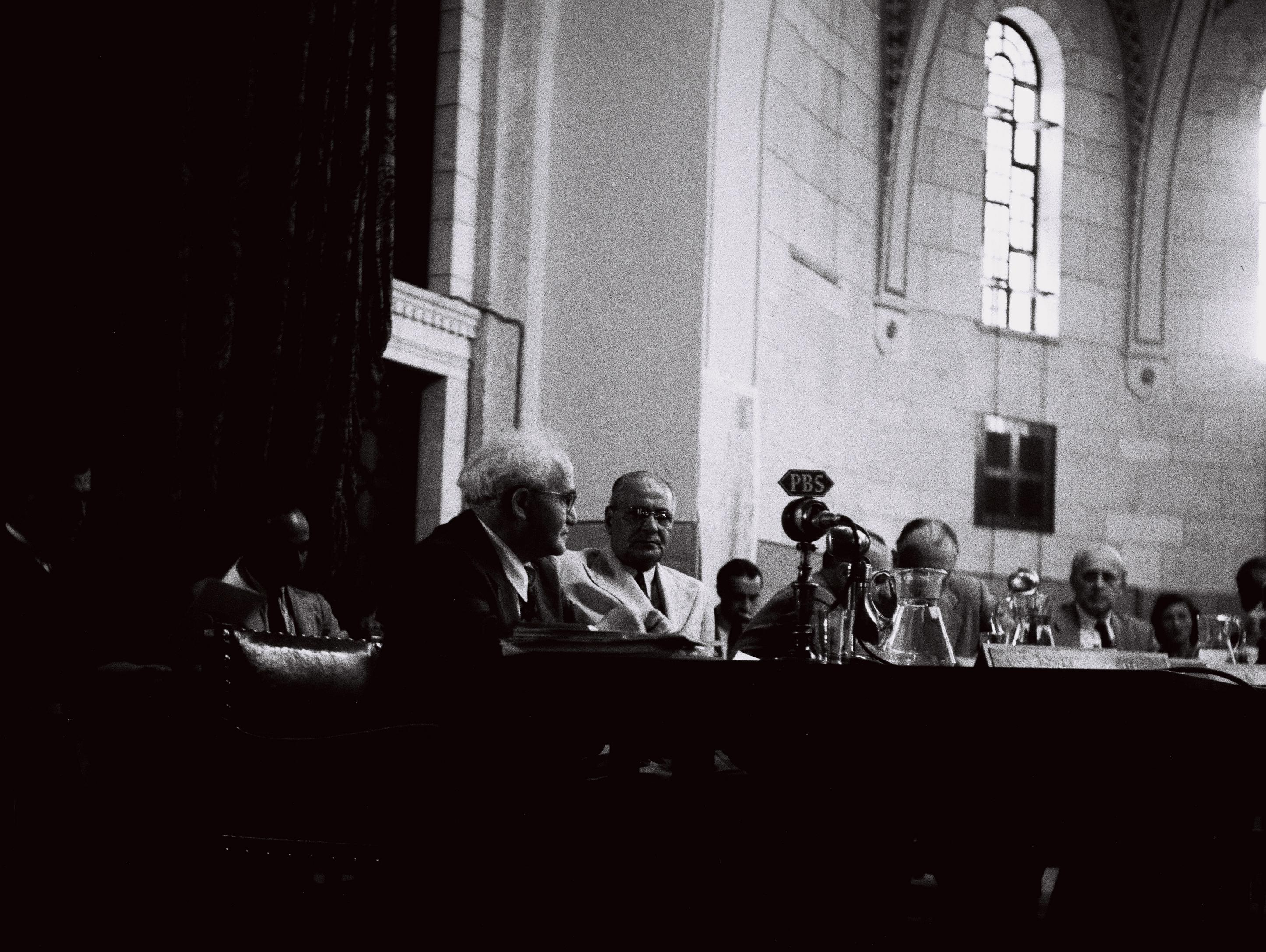
Meetings of UNSCOP at YMCA in Jerusalem (seated at far left, David Ben-Gurion)

The United Nations Special Committee on Palestine (UNSCOP) was created on 15 May 1947 in response to a United Kingdom government request that the General Assembly "make recommendations under article 10 of the Charter, concerning the future government of Palestine". The British government had also recommended the establishment of a special committee to prepare a report for the General Assembly. The General Assembly adopted the recommendation to set up the UNSCOP to investigate the cause of the conflict in Palestine, and, if possible, devise a solution. UNSCOP was made up of representatives of 11 countries. UNSCOP visited Palestine and gathered testimony from Zionist organisations in Palestine and in the US. The Arab Higher Committee boycotted the commission, explaining that the Palestinian Arabs' natural rights were self-evident and could not continue to be subject to investigation, but rather deserved to be recognized on the basis of the principles of the United Nations Charter.

The report of the committee dated 3 September 1947 supported the termination of the British Mandate in Palestine. It contained a majority proposal for a plan of partition into two independent states with an economic union and a minority proposal for a plan for a federal union with Jerusalem as its capital. The majority plan was supported by 7 of the 11 members, with Iran, India and Yugoslavia voting against it, and Australia abstaining.

Following the report's release, the Ad Hoc Committee on the Palestinian Question was appointed by the General Assembly.

On 29 November 1947, the General Assembly adopted Resolution 181, a slight modification of the recommendations proposed in the UNSCOP majority plan.

== History ==
Shortly after the British government announced that it would be referring the Palestine problem to the United Nations, the Secretary-General, Trygve Lie, ordered the establishment of a five-member team to study the Palestine issue. The team consisted of Ralph Bunche, Constantin Stavropoulos, John Noel Reedman, Henri Vigier and Alfonso Garcia Robles. Their work was to serve as background material for the "United Nations Special Committee on Palestine", which was to study the Palestine problem in the summer of 1947.

On 15 May 1947, the General Assembly established UNSCOP. The Special Committee was given wide powers to ascertain and record facts, to investigate all questions and issues relevant to the problem of Palestine, and to make recommendations. It was authorized to conduct investigations in Palestine and wherever it might deem useful.

It was decided that the committee should be composed of "neutral" countries, excluding the five permanent members of the Security Council, including the Mandatory power. The committee's final composition was: Australia, Canada, Czechoslovakia, Guatemala, India, Iran, Netherlands, Peru, Sweden, Uruguay and Yugoslavia.

== Work of the committee ==
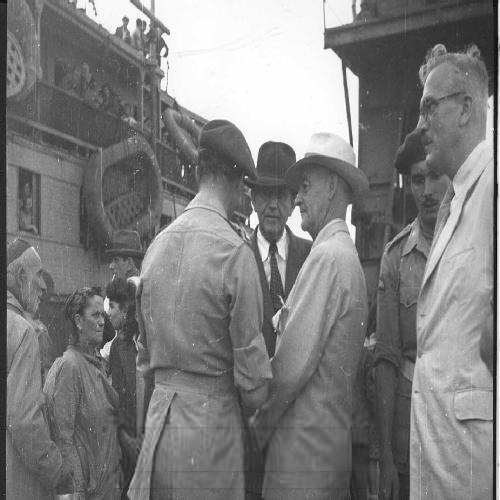
UNSCOP members visiting Haifa (July 18, 1947)

From 18 June to 3 July, the committee visited Jerusalem, Haifa, the Dead Sea, Hebron, Beersheba, Gaza, Jaffa, the Galilee, Tel Aviv, Acre, Nablus, Bayt Dajan, Tulkarm, Rehovot, Arab and Jewish settlements in the Negev, and several Jewish agricultural settlements. When visiting Jewish areas, committee members were warmly welcomed, often with flowers and cheering crowds. When the committee visited Tel Aviv, a public holiday was declared. The streets were decorated with flags and posters and crowds surrounded the delegates during their tour of the city. They met Tel Aviv mayor Israel Rokach, dining with him at a cafe and visiting city hall. During their visit to city hall, they were invited to step onto the balcony, at which point the crowd below sang Hatikvah. Jewish Agency officials also ensured they met with Jews who spoke the native languages of committee members such as Swedish, Dutch, Spanish, and Persian. Committee members were given presentations arguing the Jewish case translated into their native languages. They were shown Jewish industry and commerce, agricultural innovations to allow farming in Jewish agricultural settlements in arid regions, and various institutions including Hadassah Medical Center, the Hebrew University of Jerusalem, and the laboratories of the Daniel Sieff Institute. During the committee's visit, it was accompanied by Jewish Agency officials acting as liaisons: Abba Eban, David Horowitz, and Moshe Tov.

By contrast, committee members were ignored and faced hostility in Arab areas. During UNSCOP visits to Arab areas, they were often met with empty streets, as well as locals who refused to answer their questions and even fled restaurants when they arrived. In one instance, when committee members visited a school in Beersheba, the pupils were instructed not to look at the visitors. During a visit to an Arab village in Galilee, the entire population was evacuated except for children who remained behind and cursed at the visitors. UNSCOP members were deeply impressed by the cleanliness and modernity of Jewish areas, in comparison to the dirtiness and what they viewed as the backwardness of Arab areas. They were particularly horrified by the common sight of child labor and exploitation in Arab factories and workshops.

UNSCOP officials clandestinely met with members of the high command of the Haganah, the main Jewish underground militia. The Haganah officials who attended the meeting, Yisrael Galili, Yigael Yadin, Yosef Avidar, and Ehud Avriel, insisted that the Haganah could repel any Arab attack, including by the surrounding Arab states.

UNSCOP also met twice with commanders from the right-wing Zionist guerrilla group Irgun after arranging contact with the Irgun through an Associated Press correspondent. In the first meeting, UNSCOP members met Irgun commander Menachem Begin along with Irgun high command members Haim Landau and Shmuel Katz, while in the second meeting they met with Begin and Irgun official Meir Cahan.

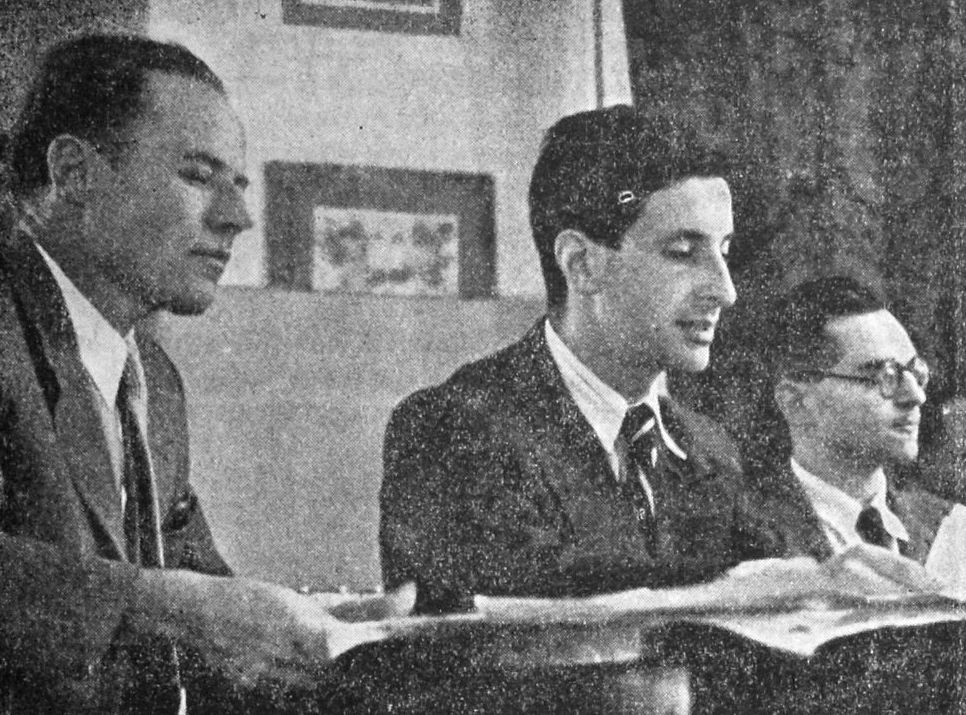
Representatives of the Palestine Communist Party address the committee, July 1947. (L-R): Shmuel Mikunis, Wolf Ehrlich, Meir Vilner.

It then held 12 public hearings from 4 to 17 July, during which 31 representatives from 12 Jewish organizations gave testimony and submitted written depositions, totaling thirty-two tons of material. Jewish Agency representatives such as David Ben-Gurion, Moshe Sharett, and Abba Eban testified, along with Chaim Weizmann, a former senior Zionist official who held no office at the particular time and testified as a private citizen. Zionist leaders argued for a Jewish state in Palestine and accepted the principle of partition. Anti-Zionist Jewish representatives from the Palestine Communist Party and Ichud parties were included. British officials also testified before the committee.

During the committee's work, the Haganah's intelligence branch SHAI conducted an extensive operation to eavesdrop on committee members so as to ensure that Zionist leaders would be better prepared for the hearings. Microphones were placed in their hotels and conference rooms, their telephone conversations were tapped, and the cleaning staff of the building where the hearings took place was replaced with female SHAI agents who monitored them while posing as cleaning ladies. The intelligence gathered was then distributed among Jewish leaders, who were instructed to destroy the documents after reading them. This did not go unnoticed: a member of the Swedish delegation complained that the cleaning staff of the building was "too pretty and educated. They are the eyes and ears of the Zionist leaders, who come to hearings with replies prepared in advance." The Haganah's spying operations on UNSCOP were headed by Chaim Herzog.

Despite the official Arab boycott, several Arab officials and intellectuals privately met committee members to argue for a unitary Arab-majority state, among them AHC member and former Jerusalem mayor Husayn al-Khalidi. The committee also received written arguments from Arab advocates.

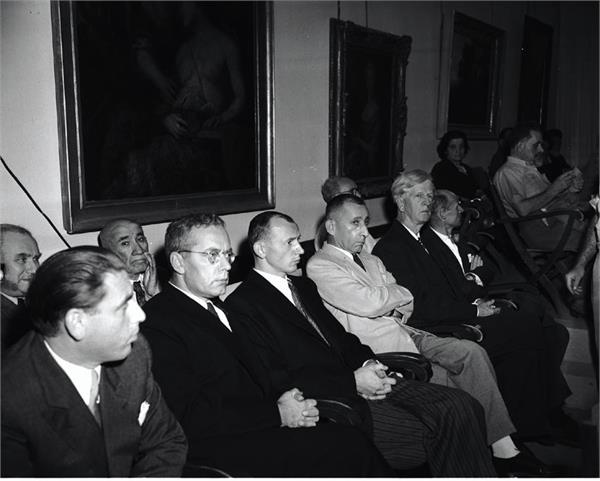
Members of UNSCOP in 1947

The committee also met British officials. Some argued that the ideal solution would be to set up two autonomous Jewish and Arab states with Britain managing the finances of the two states due to the economic difficulties of partition and allowing Britain to retain a military presence in Palestine due to the growing threat from the Soviet Union. British military officials in particular emphasized the need for a continued British military presence in light of worsening relations between Britain and Egypt, arguing that bases in Palestine and continued control over Haifa harbor were essential for the defense of the Middle East. UNSCOP members were shown new British Army barracks being constructed in the Negev (which would never be completed), and were told that this would be the future basing area for British troops in the Suez Canal zone.

The committee also noted the intense security and draconian laws in Palestine as a result of the ongoing Jewish insurgency conducted mainly by the Irgun and Lehi and to a lesser extent the Haganah. UNSCOP members noticed the constant presence of armed British security forces and armored cars in the streets, barbed wire around entire blocks of buildings, abundant pillboxes and roadblocks, and constant security checks in the streets. In addition, the Emergency Regulations imposed by the British, which allowed for detentions, confiscations, deportations, and trials before military rather than civil courts with no right to counsel, the admission of Henry Gurney, the Chief Secretary of Palestine, that the Palestine administration was spending nearly $30 million a year for police purposes, as well as the British insistence that their officials appear before UNSCOP hearings in private and a demand that they be informed in advance about who would be giving testimony, also left a negative impression.

Guatemalan delegate Jorge García Granados referred to the Palestine Mandate as a "police state." On June 16, the day of UNSCOP's first formal hearing, a British military court sentenced three Irgun fighters, Avshalom Haviv, Meir Nakar, and Yaakov Weiss, to death for their role in the Acre Prison break. UNSCOP appealed to the British government through the UN Secretary-General Trygve Lie to spare their lives. The British refused and were outraged at what they viewed as the committee's interference in the internal judicial affairs of the Mandate. Later, the Irgun captured two British sergeants and held them as hostages, threatening to kill them if the death sentences were carried out. Committee members discussed the sergeants when meeting with Begin, and refused an Irgun request to call Haviv, Nakar, and Weiss to testify before them over allegations of torture.

UNSCOP also followed the events surrounding the SS Exodus, an illegal immigration ship carrying 4,554 Jewish Holocaust survivors which was intercepted by the Royal Navy. Some Committee members were present at the port of Haifa and witnessed British soldiers violently removing resisting passengers from the ship so they could be deported back to Europe. The committee completed its work in Palestine by hearing the eyewitness testimony of the Reverend John Stanley Grauel, who travelled as a crew member on the Exodus. The committee decided to hear the testimony of the Jewish refugees in British detention camps in Palestine and in European Displaced Persons camps trying to gain admittance to Palestine.

Golda Meir, later Prime Minister of Israel, observed that Reverend Grauel's testimony and advocacy for the creation of the Jewish state fundamentally and positively changed the United Nations to support the creation of Israel.

On July 21, the committee traveled to Lebanon, where they met with Lebanese Prime Minister Riad al-Solh and Foreign Minister Hamid Frangieh, who demanded an end to further Jewish immigration and the establishment of an Arab government in Palestine and claimed that the Zionists had territorial ambitions in Jordan, Syria, and Lebanon. On July 23, the representatives of Arab League states testified before the committee in Sofar. Frangieh told the committee that Jews "illegally" in Palestine would be expelled while the situation of those "legally" in Palestine but without Palestinian citizenship would be resolved by a future Arab government. Efforts by UNSCOP members to get other Arab diplomats to soften their stance failed, with one committee member noting that "there is nothing more extreme than meeting all the representatives of the Arab world in one group... when each one tries to show that he is more extreme than the other." Privately, the committee met with pro-Zionist Maronite Christian leaders, who told them that Lebanese Christians supported partition. Half of the committee's members then flew to Amman to meet with King Abdullah of Transjordan, who claimed that the Arabs would have "difficulty" accepting partition but refused to completely rule it out, hinting that in such an event, the Arab parts of Palestine should go to Transjordan.

UNSCOP then flew to Geneva, and on August 8, a subcommittee began a week-long tour of displaced persons camps in American and British occupation zones in Germany and Austria, and interviewed Jewish refugees and local military officials. They found that there was a strong desire to immigrate to Palestine among the Jewish DPs.

In Geneva, while writing the report, the committee was subject to Jewish, Arab, and British pressure. Zionist representatives vigorously lobbied the committee. They repeatedly submitted memoranda and recruited a Palestinian Arab representative whose father had been murdered by the Husseini clan that dominated the Palestinian Arab community to argue in favor of a Jewish-Transjordanian partition of the country before the committee. The Arab League liaison submitted a memorandum demanding a solution satisfactory to the Palestinian Arabs, threatening catastrophe would result otherwise. The British submitted a memorandum arguing partition was a feasible option.

== Ad hoc committee deliberations ==
The unanimous decision of the UNSCOP was for the termination of the mandate.

The Ad Hoc Committee on the Palestinian Question was appointed by the General Assembly, and two plans were drawn up for the Governance of Palestine on the termination of the Mandate. Seven members of the UNSCOP endorsed a partition plan (the Majority report) favoured by the Zionist leadership on 2 October 1947.

== Members ==
- Australia
  - John Hood, representative
  - S. L. Atyeo, alternate
- Canada
  - Justice Ivan Rand, representative
  - Leon Mayrand, alternate
- Czechoslovakia
  - Karel Lisický, representative
  - Richard Pech, alternate
- Guatemala
  - Dr. Jorge García Granados, representative
  - Lic.Emilio Zea Gonzalez, alternate and secretary
- India
  - Sir Abdur Rahman, representative
  - Venkata Viswanathan, alternate
  - H. Dayal, second alternate
- Iran
  - Nasrollah Entezam, representative
  - Dr. Ali Ardalan, alternate
- Netherlands
  - Dr. N. S. Blom, representative
  - A. I. Spits, alternate
- Peru
  - Dr. Alberto Ulloa, representative
  - Dr. Arturo Garcia Salazar, alternate
- Sweden
  - Justice Emil Sandström, representative
  - Dr. Paul Mohn,
- Uruguay
  - Professor Enrique Rodriguez Fabregat, representative
  - Professor Óscar Secco Ellauri, alternate
  - Edmundo Sisto, secretary
- Yugoslavia
  - Vladimir Simić, representative
  - Dr. Jože Brilej, alternate
