= United Nations Palestine Commission =

The United Nations Palestine Commission was created by United Nations Resolution 181. It was responsible for implementing the UN Partition Plan of Palestine and acting as the Provisional Government of Palestine. The 1947–1948 Civil War in Mandatory Palestine and a refusal by the British government to impose a scheme which was not acceptable to both Arabs and Jews in Palestine prevented the Commission from fulfilling its responsibilities.

== Reasons for the Palestine Commission ==
As on 15 May 1948 Palestine; which was a legal entity administered under United Nations Mandate by His Britannic Majesty but was not a sovereign state (it was not self-governing) yet the authority responsible for administration of Palestine on the termination of the British Mandate must perforce change. The role assigned to the United Kingdom in the implementation of the proposals put forward in the majority decision of the Ad Hoc Committee on the Palestinian Question were not compatible with the declared intentions of the United Kingdom Government. Also since the Mandatory Power intended to withdraw from Palestine without assuming any responsibility for the establishment of a new regime which would not command general consent in Palestine there would be no regularly constituted authority in the evacuated areas unless the United Nations recommended a way in which the gap could be effectively filled.

To allow for the smooth transition of power after 15 May 1948, Britain as the Mandatory Power was to hand over to the United Nations Palestine Commission as the Provisional Government of Palestine. The United Nations Commission was to be the statutory body for the Government of Palestine and the authority with which the British Mandate authority was to make an agreement regarding the transfer of the assets of the Government of Palestine. The United Nations Commission was also to be the authority for Palestine’s internal administration and for its foreign affairs. The title of the Government of Palestine was to rest on a resolution of the General Assembly.

== Tasks of the Palestine Commission ==
The committee characterized its responsibilities as follows:

"(i) arranging for the progressive transfer of administrative authority from the Mandatory Power to the Commission and the establishment of Provisional Councils of Government;
(ii) supervision of the functioning of the Provisional Councils of Government, including the maintenance of public order in the transitional period following the termination of the Mandate;
(iii) delimitation of frontiers of the Arab and Jewish States and the City of Jerusalem;
(iv) exercise of political and military control over the armed militia in each of the projected states; including selection of their high commands;
(v) the preparatory work in connection with the establishment of the Economic Union, including the creation of the Preparatory Economic Commission and the maintenance of the economic services with which it will be concerned in the transitional period;
(vi) negotiations on the allocation and distribution of assets;
(vii) maintenance of administration and essential public services following the termination of the United Nations Statute to the city of Jerusalem; and
(ix)[sic] protection of Holy Places."

== Formation ==
The first meeting was held at 11 am on 9 January 1948 in the Economic and Social Council Chamber of the United Nations, Lake Success, New York;

The Commission's five members were:

- Mr. Karel Lisicky (Chairman) from Czechoslovakia
- Mr. Raul Diez de Medina (Vice-Chairman) from Bolivia
- Mr. Per Federspiel from Denmark
- Dr. Eduardo Morgan from Panama
- Senator Vicente J. Francisco from the Philippines

== Preparations for Government ==
For the next five months the Palestine Commission familiarised itself with the general affairs of the Government of Palestine on Currency, Railways, 1948 Civil Aviation, and was kept abreast of events in Palestine by the UK Government The Palestine Commission was in consultation with the public bodies in Palestine with regards to forming a Provisional Council of Government although the postal service appeared to be a cause of delays in that process.

On 27 February 1948 The Palestine Commission adopted the following statement of policy with respect to the continuity of employment of the employees of the Mandatory administration in Palestine, and requested the British Mandatory Power to publish the statement or circulate it to all employees of the present Government in Palestine:

"The United Nations Palestine Commission, being under the terms of the resolution of the General Assembly responsible for the administration of Palestine immediately following the termination of the Mandate, hereby calls upon all present employees of the Palestine administration to continue their service with the successor authority in Palestine when the British Mandate is terminated. It is the policy of the United Nations Palestine commission as the successor authority to maintain services on the same terms and with the same rights for employees as those enjoyed under the Mandatory Government. The Commission requests all present employees of the Palestine Administration to inform at the earliest possible date, the Mandatory Government for communication to the Commission, whether they would be willing to remain in the service of the successor administration of Palestine on such terms."

== Establishment of the Provisional Government ==
On 12 March the Palestine Commission was requested by the UK Government not to enter Palestine until 2 weeks before the termination of the Mandate.

On 17 March the Palestine Commission received a communication from the Hebrew Committee of National Liberation informing the Palestine Commission that they will be establishing a Provisional Council of Government of the Hebrew Republic of Palestine by April even though the Palestine Commission would not be in Palestine.

Communication of 26 April 1948 from the UK informing the UN Palestine commission that they are tardy for not being in Palestine to select the Jewish Provisional Government of Palestine.

== Palestine Commission Adjourns Sine Die ==
The General Assembly adopted a resolution which relieved the United Nations Palestine Commission from the further exercise of its responsibilities, and its mandate from the General Assembly was effectively terminated on 14 May 1948.

On its 75th Meeting, 17 May, the Palestine Commission adjourned sine die.

Dr. Karel Lisicky (Czechoslovakia), the Chairman said:

"We disperse with our conscience clear. We have no fear about the judgement of history."

Dr. Lisicky added further

"in view of the fact that we legally cannot disband ourselves, we shall be dead under the legal fiction that we continue."

It was the general view of the Commission members that the General Assembly resolution of 29 November 1947, remained intact and that therefore the Commission was not and could not be legally dissolved.
