= End of the British Mandate for Palestine =

Conclusion of British responsibility for administration of Palestine

Palestine Act 1948 (Note: Section 5.)
- Act of Parliament
- Parliament of the United Kingdom
- Long title: An Act to make provision with respect to the termination of His Majesty's jurisdiction in Palestine, and for purposes connected therewith.
- Citation: 11 & 12 Geo. 6. c. 27
- Territorial extent: United Kingdom

Dates
- Royal assent: 29 April 1948
- Commencement: 15 May 1948 (Note: Section 1(1).)
- Repealed: 21 May 1981

Other legislation
- Amended by: Statute Law (Repeals) Act 1976
- Repealed by: Statute Law (Repeals) Act 1981

Status: Repealed

Text of statute as originally enacted

"Palestine: Termination of the Mandate," the official British Government publication on termination, providing a historical assessment of the mandate and reasons for its termination.

The end of the British Mandate for Palestine was formally made by way of the Palestine Act 1948 (11 & 12 Geo. 6. c. 27) of 29 April. A public statement prepared by the Colonial and Foreign Office confirmed termination of British responsibility for the administration of Palestine from midnight on 14 May 1948.

== Background ==
Mandatory Palestine was created at the end of the First World War out of the dissolution of the Ottoman Empire. In 1920 Britain was awarded the mandate for Palestine by the League of Nations, to administer until such time as the territory was "able to stand alone". The White Paper of 1939 provided for the establishment of an independent Palestinian state within 10 years. As explained by Malcolm MacDonald to the 1939 meeting of the Permanent Mandates Commission it was not clear at that stage what form such a state would take. (Note: As I say, it would be premature now to attempt even to sketch the constitutional provisions which would be most appropriate to secure "the essential interests" of the Arabs and the Jews. It may be that the State should be formed on a unitary basis; it may be that it should be a federal state. It may be that the best arrangement would be to establish a predominantly Arab province or provinces, and a predominantly Jewish province or provinces, and to give to each of these political units a large measure of local autonomy under a central government dealing with matters of common concern between them. What is essential is that each people, both the Arabs and the Jews, should be free to live its own life according to its own traditions and beliefs and genius.)

The February 1945 Yalta Conference agreed that arrangements would be made to provide for United Nations trusteeships for existing League Mandates.

In July 1945, the Harrison Report was published, (Note: Penkower, 2016, pages 56–58: "The official British response could be foretold. Truman's 24 July request of Churchill had already set Near East specialist Beeley's teeth on edge, indicating to him that the Zionists had been "deploringly successful in selling the idea" that, even after Allied victory, immigration to Palestine represented for many Jews "their only hope for survival." Wishing to avoid a postwar influx of Jews into Palestine, the Foreign Office's Refugee Department had expressed the fear in March 1944 that British trials of Germans on charges of crimes against humanity committed against Jews would convince survivors not to return to their native countries after the war. Whitehall's expert on refugees, Ian Henderson, was convinced that the Zionists were behind Harrison's recommendations. British military authorities in Germany rejected Harrison's criticism, claiming that Jews were being treated exactly like all other displaced persons... In Bevin's mind, Harrison's report was "not based on real investigation." Bevin told Weizmann that Truman was merely trying to gain votes by his stance; the United States had to take its share of those Jews who must be removed from Europe.") describing the conditions of the displaced persons camps in post-World War II Europe.

In October 1945, then Foreign Secretary Bevin told the cabinet that Britain intended to turn over the Palestine problem to the UN except that Britain would be accused of evading its responsibilities if it did not first make some efforts of its own in resolving the situation.

The League of Nations at its last meeting on 18 April 1946 agreed to liquidate and transfer all of its assets to the UN. The assembly also passed a resolution approving and welcoming the intention of the British government to grant independence to Transjordan.

The report of the Anglo-American Committee of Inquiry was published 20 April 1946.

That part of the mandate in respect of Transjordan legally ended on 17 June 1946 with the ratification of the Treaty of London.

In July 1946, a committee created to establish how the Anglo-American proposals would be implemented proposed the Morrison–Grady Plan.

Following the failure of the 1946–1947 London Conference on Palestine, at which the United States refused to support the British leading to both the Morrison–Grady Plan and the Bevin Plan being rejected by all parties, the British decided to refer the question to the UN on 14 February 1947. (Note: The reasons for this decision were explained by His Majesty's Principal Secretary of State for Foreign Affairs in a speech to the House of Commons on 18 February 1947, in which he said:- "His Majesty's Government have been faced with an irreconcilable conflict of principles. There are in Palestine about 1,200,000 Arabs and 600,000 Jews. For the Jews the essential point of principle is the creation of a sovereign Jewish State. For the Arabs, the essential point of principle is to resist to the last establishment of Jewish sovereignty in any part of Palestine. The discussions of the last month have quite clearly shown that there is no prospect of resolving this conflict by any settlement negotiated between the parties. But if the conflict has to be resolved by an arbitrary decision, that is not a decision which His Majesty's Government are empowered, as Mandatory, to take. His Majesty's Government have of themselves no power, under the terms of the Mandate, to award the country either to the Arabs or to the Jews, or even to partition it between them.")

The United Nations Special Committee on Palestine (UNSCOP) was created on 15 May 1947, reported on 3 September 1947 and on 29 November 1947, the United Nations Partition Plan for Palestine was passed. It recommended that the Mandate terminate as soon as possible and not later than 1 August 1948.

Two weeks later, on 11 December, Colonial Secretary Arthur Creech Jones announced that the British Mandate would terminate on 15 May 1948. (Note: Creech Jones stated to the House of Commons: "Before the conclusion of the discussions, Sir Alexander Cadogan announced on behalf of the Government that the withdrawal of our Forces and administration would be effected by 1 August 1948... It will be appreciated that the mandatory responsibility for government in Palestine cannot be relinquished piecemeal. The whole complex of governmental responsibilities must be relinquished by the Mandatory Government for the whole of Palestine on an appointed day. As I have indicated, once our military withdrawal is properly under way, the forces necessary for exercising this responsibility will no longer be adequately available, and it will not, therefore, be possible to retain full mandatory responsibility after a certain date. The Mandate will, therefore, be terminated some time in advance of the completion of the withdrawal, and the date we have in mind for this, subject to negotiation with the United Nations Commission, is 15 May.")

== UN ==
The British requested that the Palestine question be placed on the agenda of the Second Regular Session of the General Assembly and that a Special Session be convened to constitute a Special Committee to prepare for Assembly consideration of the subject. The First Special Session of the General Assembly met between 28 April and 15 May 1947 to consider the British request. An attempt by the five Arab members of the UN (Egypt, Iraq, Lebanon, Saudi Arabia and Syria) to add an item to the agenda addressing the "termination of the Mandate over Palestine and the declaration of its independence" was unsuccessful.

Following the publication of the UNSCOP report, the Ad Hoc Committee on the Palestinian Question was formed by a vote of the Second Regular Session of the General Assembly on 23 September 1947.

== Palestine ==
Regulations governing land transfers and clauses relating to immigration were implemented although by 1944, 24,000 of 75,000 immigration certificates still remained for use. The immigration limits were relaxed to allow immigration at the rate of 18,000 a year as a reaction to the situation of Jewish refugees in Europe.

With the end of the war, the new Labour Government, led by Clement Attlee, with Ernest Bevin as Foreign Secretary, decided to maintain the White Paper policy.

Immediately after the UN resolution, the 1947–1948 civil war in Mandatory Palestine broke out between the Arab and Jewish communities. On the last day of the Mandate, the creation of the State of Israel was proclaimed, and the 1948 Arab–Israeli War began. In March 1948, the British Cabinet had agreed that the civil and military authorities in Palestine should make no effort to oppose the setting up of a Jewish State or a move into Palestine from Transjordan.

Sir Henry Gurney served as Chief Secretary in Palestine from October 1946 to termination and wrote a diary covering the period. A review by historian Rory Miller speaks approvingly of editor Golani's decision to include detailed scholarly annotations and perspectives to the diary.

== Arab response ==
On 22 March 1945, the Arab League was founded. The Arab Higher Committee (AHC) was reconstituted in November 1945 to represent Palestinian Arabs and met at the beginning of May 1946 to consider their response to the publication of the Anglo American report. The Arab states reacted with summit meetings at Inshas at the end of May and Bloudan in June. After the failure of the London Conference and UN referral the Arabs continued to press their demand for an immediate independent Arab Palestine.

== Jordan ==
Abdullah had connections with Zionists and Palestine over many years, according to an account given by historian Mary Wilson. Historians have described a meeting between Abdullah and the Jewish Agency on 17 November 1947 during which Abdullah is alleged to have reached an understanding in regard to Abdullah's intent to occupy the Arab territories of the partition plan. Following the end of the mandate, the Jordanian Arab Legion, under the leadership of Sir John Bagot Glubb, known as Glubb Pasha, was ordered to enter Palestine and secure the UN designated Arab area.

== Zionist response ==
In May 1942, the Biltmore Conference in New York City with 600 delegates and Zionist leaders from 18 countries attending, demands "that Palestine be established as a Jewish Commonwealth" (state), rather than a "homeland".

== American response ==
At the end of August 1945, U.S. President Harry Truman issued a statement requesting the British government to admit 100,000 Jewish refugees in Europe into Palestine. On 14 May 1948, the United States de facto recognized the provisional Jewish government contemporaneously declared (de jure recognition on 31 January 1949).

== Legal issues and reasons to terminate ==
Law professor Shabtai Rosenne says that there is no clear answer as to why the British took this step and lists miscalculation as well as political and military fatigue among others. Ravndal cites works from the 1980s establishing that the British were motivated by "economic necessity and plain exhaustion" but then goes on to posit that the British were motivated by a Cold War desire to secure Britain's interests in the rest of the Middle East. A summary of different views is given by Benny Morris.

Mandates were intended to end with the independence of the Mandated territory. The British government had taken the position that there was nothing in law to prevent termination due to frustration of purpose. In the event, the UNSCOP report recommended both that the Mandate be terminated and independence granted at the earliest practicable dates with a transition period between these events.
