= List of newspapers in Lebanon =

Hadiqat al-Akhbar (The News Garden in English) is the first daily newspaper of Lebanon which was launched in 1858. From 1858 to 1958 there were nearly 200 newspapers in the country. Prior to 1963 the number of newspapers was more than 400. However, the number reduced to 53 due to the 1963 press law.

Censorship of the press in the country occurred during the Ottoman era. It was also frequent in 1976 following the intervention of Syrian military in the Lebanese Civil War on behalf of Maronite Christians. As of 2012, the newspapers were being published in three major languages of Arabic, English and French and there were 12 Arabic dailies.

The following is a list of well-known newspapers published in Lebanon.

== Daily newspapers ==
All published in Beirut

=== In Arabic ===
- An-Nahar
- Ad-Diyar
- Al Akhbar
- Al Binaa
- Al Joumhouria
- Al Liwaa
- Al Amal
- Al Anbaa (defunct)
- Al Anwar (defunct)
- Al Arz (defunct)
- Al Balad (defunct)
- Al Bayrak (defunct)
- Al Ittihad (defunct)
- Al Muharrir (defunct)
- Al-Mustaqbal (defunct)
- Al Nida (defunct)
- As-Safa (defunct)
- As-Safir (defunct)
- El Shark
- Nida Al-Watan
- Telegraph Beirut (defunct)
- Akhbar SMB

=== In Armenian ===
- Ararad
- Aztag
- Zartonk
- Ayk (defunct)

=== In English ===
- Al Akhbar (suspended)
- Lebanon Daily Star (defunct)
- Ike (defunct)

=== In French ===
- Al Balad en français (defunct)
- L'Orient-Le Jour
- Syrie (defunct)
- Le Soir (defunct)
- Le Reveil (defunct)

== Lebanese non-daily newspapers ==
=== In Arabic ===
- Lobnan Alyawm
- Al-Intiqad (Beirut)
- Al-Kalima (Zahlé)
- Al-Tamadon (Tripoli)
- Hamzat Wassel (Beirut, Tripoli)
- Lisan al Hal
- Asharara
- Ila-l-Amam (defunct)

=== In English ===
- Monday Morning (defunct)

== Lebanese online news portals (Arabic, French and English ) ==
- 961today
- info3
- The961.com
- Daily beirut
- Alankabout
- Iloubnan.info
- Lebanon24
- Tayyar.org (Disclosure: Owned by the FPM political party)
- Lebanon Debate
- Lebanon Files
- LibanVision
- Lebanonwire
- Naharnet
- Lebanos
- Al Moutaqadem
- NOW Lebanon
- Ya Libnan
- Akhbar SMB موقع شباب الملعب البلدي الأخباري
- Ebaldati
- Almodon
- jadidouna news*

== See also ==
- List of magazines in Lebanon
