= Arz =

Arz or ARZ may refer to:

== Places ==
- Arz (river), in Brittany, France
- Île-d'Arz, an archipelago in Brittany, France
- Cedars of God, a forest in Lebanon

== Sport ==
- Arizona Cardinals
- Arizona Diamondbacks
- Arizona Coyotes

== Other uses ==
- Al Arz, an Arabic newspaper published in Lebanon between 1895 and 1916
- Arz missile, a Lebanese surface-to-surface missile
- Arz von Wasegg, a South Tyrolean noble family
- Arz (rapper), a rapper who had a hit in the UK in 2021 with the track Alone With You
- Egyptian Arabic (ISO 639-3 language code: arz), a dialect of Arabic
- N'zeto Airport in Angola
