= Bloudan Conference of 1946 =

Pan-Arab summit held in Bloudan, Syria

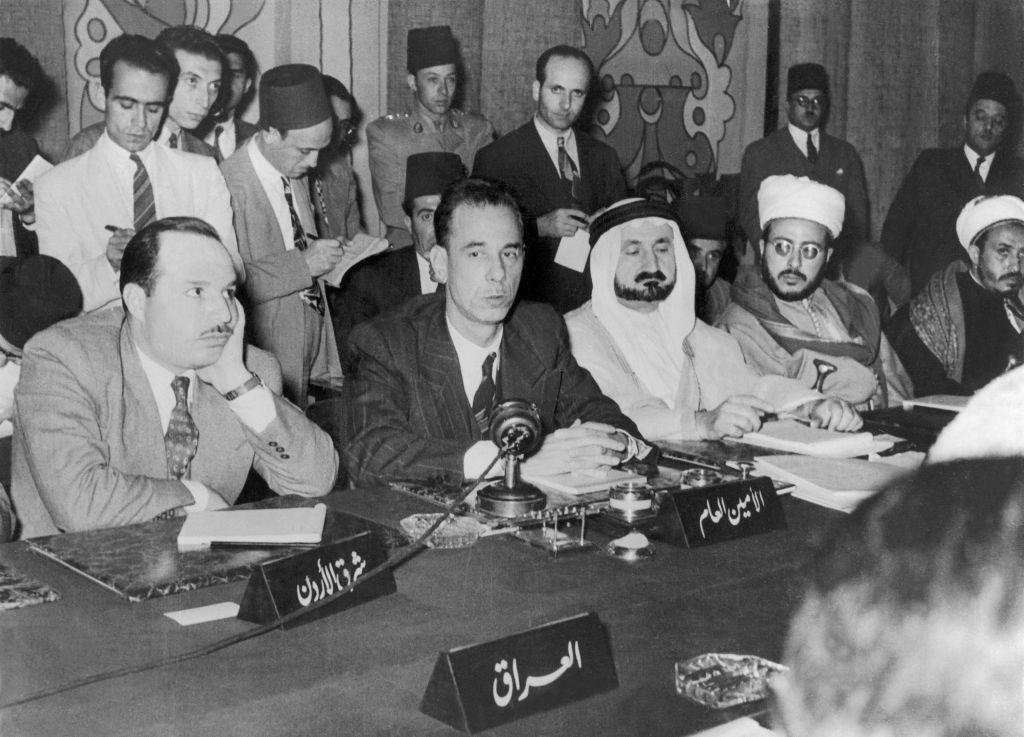
Arab leaders at the 1946 Bludan Conference

The Bloudan Conference of 1946 (Note: Also spelled "Bludan") (Arabic transliteration: al-Muʾtamar al-ʿArabi al-Qawmi fi Bludan) was the second pan-Arab summit, held in Bloudan, Syria, from 8 to 12 June 1946, following the first conference in 1937. It was convened by the Arab League to consider the findings of the Anglo-American Committee of Inquiry, published on 20 April 1946.

== Historical context ==
On 13 November 1945, U.S. President Harry S. Truman made public a letter he had written in August urging the British government to admit 100,000 Jewish immigrants to Palestine. Arab leaders viewed this as a repudiation of the White Paper of 1939, which limited Jewish immigration and rejected the partition of Palestine. In December 1945, both houses of the U.S. Congress passed resolutions supporting unrestricted Jewish immigration. In response, King Ibn Saud of Saudi Arabia and King Farouk of Egypt issued a joint statement on 16 January 1946 declaring that they “associated themselves with all Moslem Arabs in their belief that Palestine is an Arab country and that it is the right of its people and the right of the Moslem Arabs everywhere to preserve it as an Arab country.”

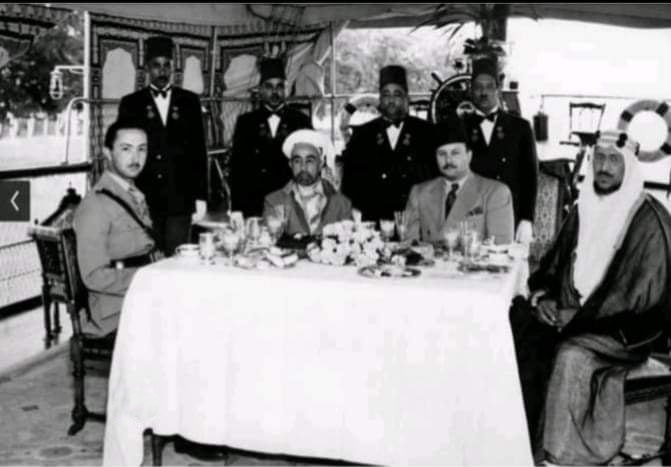
Arab leaders at the Inshas Conference in May 1946, shortly before the Bloudan Conference.

The Anglo-American Committee of Inquiry published its report on 20 April 1946. In response, Arab heads of state met at Inshas, Egypt, on 28–29 May 1946. They demanded an end to Jewish immigration to Palestine, opposed the transfer of Arab land to Jews, and called for Palestinian independence. They further declared that any U.S. or British policy contrary to these demands would be considered “a hostile policy directed against Arab Palestine and therefore against the Arab countries themselves.” The leaders also agreed to fund propaganda efforts and to support the Palestinians “with every means possible” should they be compelled to defend themselves. It concluded that they hoped the 'cordial relations' between the Arab states and the UK and US "would not be disturbed by measures affecting the rights of Palestinian Arabs". Other Arab leaders dissented from this statement. Syrian President Shukri al-Quwatli gave an emotional speech for the Arabs to sacrifice themselves for Palestine. On the other hand, King Abdullah of Transjordan argued that the Arabs should not fight Britain but instead cooperate with the UK to prevent the sale of land to Jews. On 6 June 1946, Truman reiterated his request for the admission of 100,000 Jewish immigrants.

== Meeting ==
On 8 June 1946, representatives of the Arab League convened in Bloudan. The Iraqi delegation adopted the most confrontational stance. Prime Minister Hamdi al-Pachachi argued that the central issue was “what measures we are prepared to take to compel the United States and Britain to observe their limits … in the implementation of the [Anglo-American Committee’s] report.” Iraqi Foreign Minister Muhammad Fadhel al-Jamali asserted that “the Zionists have made Palestine an issue of domestic American politics and seize the occasion of every election to elicit the support of American officials … The United States and Britain pay no attention to what we say or write unless we also act.”

By contrast, the Saudi delegation urged moderation. Royal adviser Yusuf Yasin emphasized the limits of Arab power and argued that the Palestinians, together with an Arab League delegation, should continue negotiations with the United States and Britain. He quoted from a letter by King Ibn Saud that "in no circumstances would he send a man or a gun to start a fight against the British, and that any such proposal was childish". Egypt and Syria supported the Saudi position.

The Secretary General of the Arab League, Azzam Pasha, proposed a compromise. The conference agreed to strengthen the boycott of Zionist institutions through measures such as restricting Jewish immigration to Palestine, banning Zionist goods, and enacting legislation prohibiting land sales to Zionists. However, Syrian delegate Fares al-Khoury warned that a boycott of Britain would severely damage Syria’s economy, while the Egyptian delegate Mahmoud El Nokrashy Pasha opposed Arab military intervention.

The conference appointed a new Palestinian nationalist front. It dissolved the Higher Arab Committee (HAC) and the Higher Arab Front and created the Higher Arab Executive (HAE). The new body was headed by Amin al-Husseini (Note: Amin al-Husseini was appointed in absentia, as he was then in French custody and would not escape until June 1946.), with Jamal al-Husayni as his deputy and vice chairman and former mayor of Jerusalem Hussein Khalidi as General Secretary. It also included Ahmad Hilmi and Emil Ghuri. The committee was tasked with negotiating with Britain while also adopting secret resolutions to be implemented if the Anglo-American Committee’s recommendations were carried out.

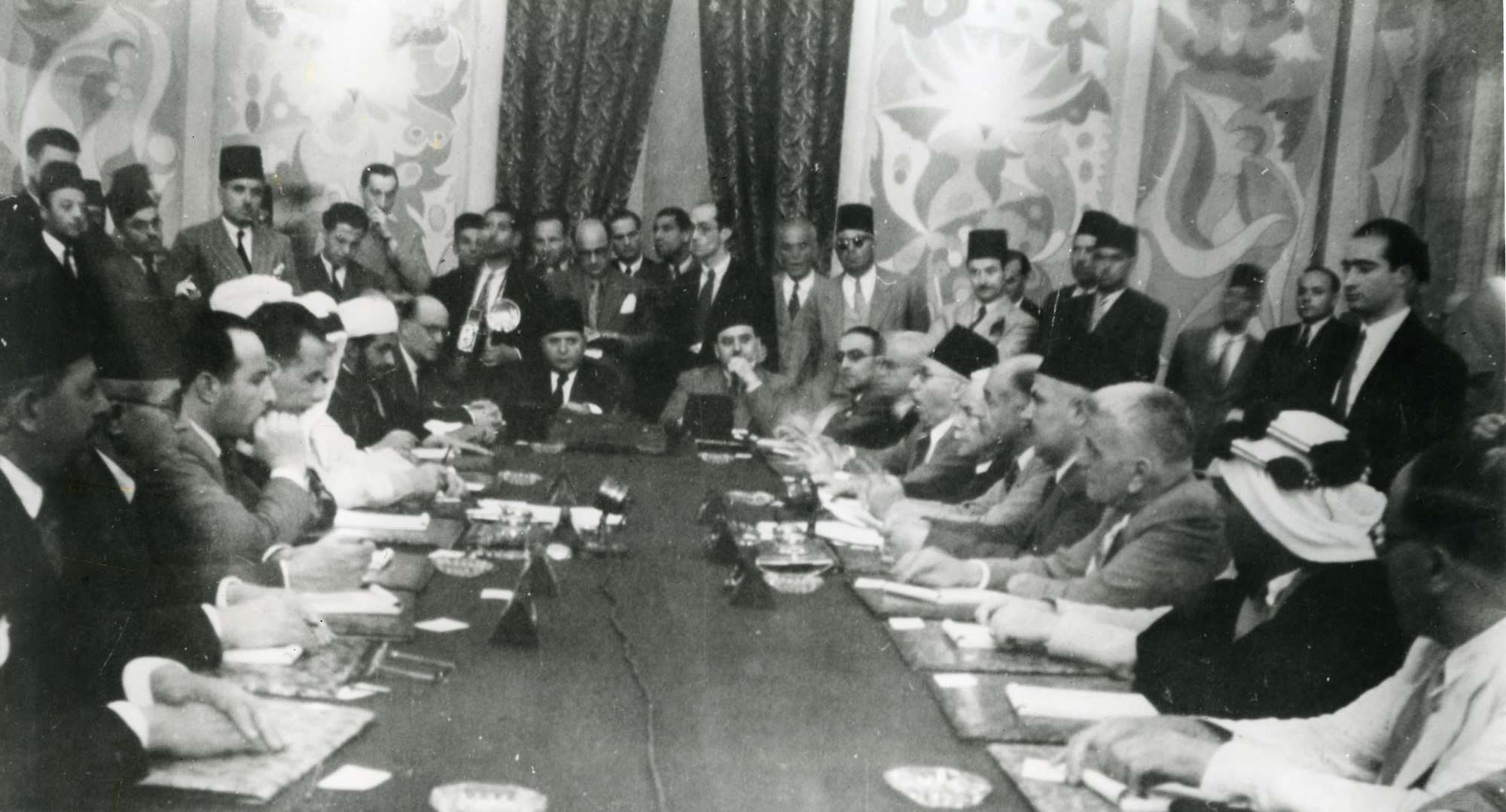
Arab Leaders meeting at Bludan

The main decisions were:

1. the immediate establishment of a Palestine Land Rescue Fund of £P1,000,000
2. the establishment of a Propaganda Fund to strengthen the Arab boycott of Zionist trade
3. note to be sent to the British government protesting against American intervention and inviting the British government to negotiate directly with the Arab League;
4. a note to be sent to the American government protesting against their defense of Zionism.

The secret resolutions provided for:

1. withholding new economic concessions from Britain and the United States;
2. refraining from supporting their special interests in international organizations;
3. imposing a moral boycott; and
4. considering the cancellation of existing concessions in Arab countries.

The head of the Egyptian delegation, Mohammed Hussein Heikal, supported only raising the Palestine issue at the United Nations and was either unaware of or opposed to the other resolutions. Azzam Pasha did not disclose the details of the secret resolutions to British or American officials but warned that “when the time came for their implementation, relations with the Arab countries would be grievously affected.”

== Aftermath ==
On 2 July 1946, Truman announced that the United States was prepared to support the admission of 100,000 Jewish immigrants to Palestine. British Foreign Secretary Ernest Bevin agreed to resume negotiations by reconvening the London Conference of 1946–1947 in September. The resulting Morrison–Grady Plan, which proposed a federal trusteeship, was rejected by both Arab and Zionist representatives. Britain subsequently decided to refer the Palestine question to the United Nations.

In December 1946, the Arab League rejected an Iraqi proposal to create an Arab police force for deployment in Arab areas of Palestine with British consent. Following the establishment of the United Nations Special Committee on Palestine, Arab leaders met again at Sofar, Lebanon, on 16 September 1947. Iraq again advocated intervention, while Saudi Arabia and Egypt continued to favor moderation. At a subsequent meeting in Aley, Syria, from 7 to 15 October 1947, the League agreed to establish a military committee with representatives from Iraq, Transjordan, Lebanon, Syria, and Palestine. The committee approved mobilization along the Palestine frontier but stopped short of authorizing military intervention, agreeing only to supply the Palestinians with 10,000 rifles. Amin al-Husseini demanded the creation of a provisional Palestinian government; Iraq and Transjordan opposed the proposal, Egypt and Saudi Arabia supported it, and Syria and Lebanon remained undecided. Another meeting, convened by Iraq in Cairo from 8 to 12 December 1947 following the adoption of UN Resolution 181, saw renewed calls to implement the Bloudan secret protocols and undertake military intervention. The Saudi prime minister opposed both the implementation of the protocols and Arab military intervention, while the Egyptian prime minister rejected direct intervention by Egypt but agreed to send volunteers. In February 1948, the Arab League took a further step by agreeing not to approve permits for new oil pipelines or additional oil concessions, a measure that fell short of the comprehensive oil boycott threatened at Bloudan. Ultimately, the secret resolutions adopted at Bloudan were never fully implemented.

== Members ==
- Arab League: Secretary-General Abd al-Rahman Azzam
- Egypt: Leader of the Saadist Party Mahmoud El Nokrashy Pasha (Note: He attended only the first two days, citing coalition negotiations in Cairo.)
- Egypt: Head of delegation, president of the Egyptian Senate, and leader of the Liberal Constitutional Party Mohammed Hussein Heikal
- Egypt: Leader of the Wafdist Bloc Makram Ebied
- Egypt: Leader of the National Party Muhammad Hafiz Ramadan Pasha
- Iraq: Prime Minister Hamdi al-Pachachi
- Iraq: Foreign Minister Muhammad Fadhel al-Jamali
- Emirate of Transjordan: Delegate Fawzi al-Mulki
- Saudi Arabia: Royal adviser Yusuf Yasin
- Syria: Prime Minister Saadallah al-Jabiri
- Syria: Speaker of Parliament Fares al-Khoury
- Syria: Delegate Jamil Mardam Bey
- Lebanon: Delegate Saeb Salam
- Lebanon: Delegate Philippe Takla
- Lebanon: Delegate Saadi al-Munla
- Palestine: Delegate Jamal al-Husayni
- Palestine: Delegate Ahmad al-Shuqairi
- United Kingdom: Head of the British Middle East office in Cairo Brigadier Iltyd Nicholl Clayton

== Bibliography ==
- Cohen, Michael J. (1982). Palestine and the Great Powers: 1945-1948. Princeton University Press. ISBN 9781400853571.
- Khalidi, Walid (1986). "The Arab Perspective". In Louis, Roger; Stookey, Robert W. (eds.). The End of the Palestine Mandate. University of Texas Press. pp. 104–136. ISBN 9780292720633.
- Levenberg, Haim (1989). The Military Preparations of the Arab Community in Palestine, 1945-1948. London School of Economics and Political Science.
- Mayer, Thomas (1986). "Egypt's 1948 Invasion of Palestine". Middle Eastern Studies. 22 (1): 20–36. doi:10.1080/00263208608700648. JSTOR 4283094 – via JSTOR.
