= Bevin Plan =

Peace proposal for Arabs and Jews

Proposals for the Future of Palestine – July 1946 – February 1947, Cmd 7044; the Bevin Plan was the third of the three proposals.

The Bevin Plan, also described as the Bevin–Beeley Plan was Britain's final attempt in the mid-20th century to solve the troubled situation that had developed between Arabs and Jewish people in Mandatory Palestine.

The plan was proposed by the British Foreign Secretary Ernest Bevin at the London Conference of 1946–47, following the rejection of the Morrison–Grady Plan. Bevin had been advised by diplomat Harold Beeley.

It was also rejected by all parties.

Bevin and Beeley were subsequently cast in a negative light in Israeli legend "as a malevolent midwife at the birth of the state". Following the rejection, the British Government referred the issue of Palestine to the United Nations, leading to the creation of the United Nations Special Committee on Palestine.

A number of elements of the Bevin plan were similar to the March 1948 American trusteeship proposal for Palestine, proposed four months after the United Nations Partition Plan for Palestine.

== The plan ==
The plan maintained the principle of cantonization suggested in the Morrison-Grady Plan, whilst proposing that Palestine be placed under a five-year trusteeship regime.

The admission of "100,000 displaced persons", proposed in the Harrison Report, would be allowed at a rate of 4,000 immigrants per month over two years.

From the Zionist perspective, the plan was worse than the Morrison–Grady Plan, as it did not propose partition at the end of the trusteeship period. Instead, it proposed the election of a "Constituent Assembly", for which decisions would require a "majority of the Jewish representatives and a majority of the Arab representatives".

== Bibliography ==
- H. Levenberg, "Bevin's Disillusionment: The London Conference, Autumn 1946", Middle Eastern Studies, Vol. 27, No. 4 (October 1991), pp. 615–630
