= Al-Ittihad =

Al-Ittihad (meaning united) or Ittihad may refer to:

== Sports ==
=== Football ===
==== Men's teams ====
- Al-Ittihad Club (Jeddah), Jeddah, Saudi Arabia
- Al Ittihad SCSC (Tripoli), Tripoli, Libya
- Al Ittihad Gheryan, Gharyan, Libya
- Al Ittihad Misurata SC, Misurata, Libya
- Al Ittihad SC (Bahrain), Manama, Bahrain
- Al-Itihad FC (Kuwait), Kuwait City, Kuwait
- Al Ittihad Alexandria Club, Alexandria, Egypt
- Al Ittihad SC (Iraq), Basra, Iraq
- Al Ittihad Club (Salalah), Salalah, Oman
- Al Ittihad SC (Nablus), Nablus, Palestine
- Al Ittihad SC (Wad Madani), Wad Madani, Sudan
- Al Ittihad Ahli of Aleppo SC, Aleppo, Syria
- Al Ittihad SCC (Ibb), Ibb, Yemen
- Ittihad Al-Ramtha SC, Ar-Ramtha, Jordan

==== Women's teams ====
- Al-Ittihad Club (Jeddah, women), Jeddah, Saudi Arabia
- Etihad Club, Amman, Jordan

=== Basketball ===
==== Men's teams ====
- Al Ittihad Alexandria (basketball), Alexandria, Egypt
- Al-Ittihad Jeddah (basketball), Jeddah, Saudi Arabia
- Al-Ittihad SC Aleppo (men's basketball), Aleppo, Syria
- Amman United, Amman, Jordan

==== Women's teams ====
- Al-Ittihad SC Aleppo (women's basketball), Aleppo, Syria

== Newspapers ==
- Al Ittihad Al Ichtiraki, a daily Arabic-language newspaper founded in 1983
- Al-Ittihad (Emirati newspaper), a daily Arabic-language newspaper founded in 1969
- Al-Ittihad (Israeli newspaper), a daily Arabic-language newspaper founded in 1944
- Al-Ittihad (Lebanese newspaper), an Arabic-language newspaper founded in 2017

== Politics ==
- Ittihad Party (Azerbaijan), Islamist party in the Azerbaijan Democratic Republic that existed from 1917 to 1920
- Ittihad Party, Islamist political party active in the Kingdom of Egypt from 1924 to 1936
- Al-Itihaad al-Islamiya, an Islamist militant group in Somalia that was active from 1992 to 2006
- Ittihad-ul-Mujahideen Pakistan, Islamist militant group in Pakistan
- Sunni Ittihad Council, Islamist political party in Pakistan

== Places ==
- Al-Ittihad, Ramallah, a town in the Palestinian territories
- Al-Ittihad, South Arabia, the former capital of South Arabia, now Madinat ash Sha'b, a district of Aden

== See also ==
- Etihad (disambiguation)
