= El Shark =

Lebanese newspaper

El Shark الشرق
- Type: Daily newspaper
- Format: Print, online
- Owner: Dar EL Shark
- Founded: 1926
- Political alignment: Center
- Language: Arabic
- Website: https://www.elsharkonline.com/

El Shark (Arabic: الشرق, lit. 'The East') is a Lebanese daily newspaper founded in 1926 published in Arabic in Beirut, Lebanon. It is published by Dar El Shark (Arabic: دار الشرق) also founded in Lebanon in 1926. The company also publishes Nadine monthly.

== See also ==
- List of newspapers in Lebanon
