= Joseph Abu Khalil =

Lebanese politician (1925–2019)

- Born: 1925; Beit ed-Dine, Mount Lebanon
- Died: December 2019 (aged 86–87)
- Occupations: Journalist; Politician
- Political party: Kataeb Party

Joseph Abu Khalil (1925–2019) was a Lebanese politician from the Kataeb Party. He served in various posts in the party and edited its official newspaper, Al Amal, for a long time.

== Biography ==
Being a native of Beit ed-Dine, Mount Lebanon, Abu Khalil was born in 1925. He was a member of Abi Khalil Maronite family He was one of the close allies of the Kataeb Party leadership, namely Gemayel family members, including Pierre Gemayel and his son Bashir Gemayel. At the beginning of the 2000s Abu Khalil was an advisor to Amine Gemayel, the eldest son of Pierre Gemayel. Within the Kataeb party he held several posts. Abu Khalil was political secretary of the party in the mid-1970s. He was elected its deputy president in the congress in June 2015 when Samy Gemayel was elected president of Kataeb party.

Abu Khalil was among the founders of a radio station, Voice of Lebanon, in 1958. Next he was named the editor-in-chief of Al Amal newspaper.

Abu Khalil died in December 2019.
