= Elias Rababi =

Lebanese politician and journalist (1913–1999)

Ambassador of Lebanon to Argentina
- In office 1962 – February 1966

Ambassador of Lebanon to Germany
- In office 9 October 1959 – 1 October 1962
- Preceded by: Georges Hakim
- Succeeded by: Naim Amyouni

Personal details
- Born: 1913
- Died: 1999 (aged 85–86)
- Party: Kataeb Party

Elias Rababi (1913–1999) was a Lebanese journalist and politician who served as the general secretary of the Kataeb Party. He was also Lebanese ambassador to Germany and Argentina. His other significant post was the editor-in-chief of the Kataeb Party's newspaper, Al Amal.

== Biography ==
Born in 1913 Rababi was a Maronite and a member of the Kataeb Party. Following the establishment of the party in 1936 he was appointed its regional director and actively involved in the recruitment activities. He was the candidate of the party in the by-election on 4 May 1945 in Mount Lebanon. However, not Rababi but Philippe Takla won the seat. The party's newspapers, Al Amal and Action, were also edited by him for a long time, and Rababi headed the propaganda and press department of the party. He also was a columnist for the An-Nahar newspaper in the 1980s.

Rababi was one of the persons who developed early connections between the Israeli officials and the Kataeb Party in the period 1948–1951. In the 1950 meeting they discussed the financial assistance of Israel to the party concerning the preparations for the next general elections. Rababi also organized a meeting between Pierre Gemayel, Kataeb leader, and Yehoshua Palmon, an Israeli diplomat, in Switzerland in 1950. These contacts were first uncovered by an Israeli journalist and historian, Benny Morris, who wrote for The Jerusalem Post in 1983.

Rababi was the ambassador of Lebanon to Germany between 9 October 1959 and 1 October 1962. Then he served as the ambassador of Lebanon to Argentina until February 1966.

Rababi died in December 1999.
