= Etihad (disambiguation) =

Etihad, from the Arabic for "union" (اتحاد ʾIttiḥād), primarily refers to Etihad Airways, the second largest flag carrier airline of the United Arab Emirates.

Etihad may also refer to:

== Entities associated with the United Arab Emirates ==
- Etihad Rail, a railway company of the United Arab Emirates
- Etihad Towers, a building complex in Abu Dhabi
- Etihad Airways, flag carrier airline of Abu Dhabi, United Arab Emirates
- Darwin Airline, a Swiss airline that operated under the brand name Etihad Regional

== Related to sports sponsorships ==
- City of Manchester Stadium, known as Etihad Stadium for sponsorship reasons

- Etihad Campus, an area of Sportcity, Manchester including the stadium

- Etihad Park, a soccer stadium in New York City
- Docklands Stadium, a stadium in Melbourne, formerly known as Etihad Stadium for sponsorship reasons

== See also ==
- Al-Ittihad (disambiguation)
