= Al-Mustaqbal (newspaper) =

Beirut-based Arabic online newspaper

Al-Mustaqbal المستقبل
- Al-Mustaqbal front page on 14 November 2015
- Type: Daily newspaper (until 2019); Online newspaper (from 2019)
- Format: Printed (until 2019); Online
- Owner: Saad Hariri
- Founder: Rafic Hariri
- Publisher: Arab United Press
- Editor-in-chief: Hani Hammoud
- Managing editor: George Bkassini
- Founded: 1999
- Ceased publication: 2019 (print)
- Political alignment: Centre-right
- Language: Arabic
- Headquarters: Beirut
- Website: Al Mustaqbal

Al-Mustaqbal (Arabic: المستقبل, lit. 'The Future') is an Arabic language online newspaper in Lebanon, headquartered in Beirut and is an official publication of the Future Movement. In 2019, it was announced that the newspaper would cease publication of its paper edition, but that it would continue online.

== History and profile ==
Al Mustaqbal was launched in 1999 by Rafic Hariri, former Prime Minister and assassinated leader of the Future Movement. The daily is based in Beirut. Arab United Press is the publisher. The key names at the newspaper are: Al Fadel Chalak: Founder, Rafic Nakib (General Manager 1999-2015). Editor in chief: Hani Hammoud. Managing Editor: George Bkassini. Head of the International News department: Fouad Hoteit. Head of Economic dep: Hala Saghbini. Head of culture dep: Yakzan Takki. Head of Sports dep: Mohamed Fawaz. Head of Photos dep: Nabil Ismail. Head of IT dep: Shadi Jawhar. US & Europe Correspondent: Mourad Mourad. Top Opinion Columnists include: Paul Shaoul, Wissam Saade, Assaad Haidar, Soraya Shahin, Ali Noon, Khairallah Khairallah, Bchara Khairallah, Fares Khachan, Mouhammad Sammak, Salah Takieddine, Rouba Kabbara, Fatima Houhou and Nassif Hitti. Prominent Lebanese journalists like Nassir AlAsaad, Radwan Sayed, Michel Nawfal and Faisal Salman worked previously as senior journalists and managing editors of the daily.

The paper had a cultural supplement, Nawafiz which was managed for years by Youssef Bazzi. The publication of the supplement ended since October 2015 as the number of the pages of the daily was reduced from 24 to 20 pages. From 1999 the daily had a weekly page concerning the environmental issues.

A 2009 survey by Ipsos Stat established that Al Mustaqbal was among the five most popular newspapers in Beirut. The paper ended publication in 2019.

== Political stance ==
The newspaper expresses the views of the Movement of the Future and supports the Lebanese March 14 Alliance. In addition, the daily is one of the major anti-Syrian publications in the Middle East.

== Bans ==
The daily had an online newspaper which was banned in Syria in July 2007.

== See also ==
- List of newspapers in Lebanon
