= Frank W. Buxton =

American journalist and editor

- Born: Frank William Buxton; October 24, 1877; Woonsocket, Rhode Island
- Died: September 6, 1974 (aged 96); Newton, Massachusetts
- Education: Harvard University
- Occupations: Journalist, editor-in-chief, businessman
- Awards: Pulitzer Prize

Frank William Buxton (October 24, 1877 – September 6, 1974) was an American journalist and editor, best known for winning the Pulitzer Prize in 1924.

== Early life and education ==
Buxton was born in Woonsocket, Rhode Island. After attending Woonsocket High School until 1896, he attended Harvard University, graduating in 1900.

== Career ==
He joined the Woonsocket Evening Call as a reporter and then, in 1901, the Boston Advertiser, where for the next three years he reported and did editorial work in New York, Louisville, and Atlanta. In 1904 he joined the Boston Herald, first as a journalist, then as editor, until he became editor of the Sunday edition.

He resigned to enter the world of advertising. During World War I, he was employed as an expert and assistant to the director of the Division of Planning and Statistics of the United States Shipping Board. When peace returned, he became vice-president and merchandise manager of the E. T. Slattery Company of Boston. In 1922, however, he returned to the Boston Herald as managing editor.

In 1924, he was awarded the Pulitzer Prize for Editorial Writing for an article published the previous year entitled "Who Made Calvin Coolidge?" which contained only 9 paragraphs and analyzed the success of the recently elected President of the United States.

In 1945, U.S. President Harry S. Truman appointed him to the Anglo-American Committee of Inquiry into the problems of the Jews in Europe and Palestine. Four months later, the committee called for Palestine to take in 100,000 European Jews, categorically rejected the idea of the creation of a Jewish state and rejected Arab demands.

From 1928 to 1961, he was a member of the Board of Trustees of the Boston Public Library.

== Death ==
He died on September 6, 1974, in Newton, Massachusetts.
