= Harrison Report =

1945 report on conditions in displaced persons camps in post-WW II Europe

The report

The Harrison Report was a July 1945 report carried out by United States lawyer Earl G. Harrison, as U.S. representative to the Intergovernmental Committee on Refugees, into the conditions of the displaced persons camps in post-World War II Europe.

Harrison's report was part of the impetus for the creation of the Anglo-American Committee of Inquiry regarding Mandatory Palestine, then under a British mandate, which was formed to recommend policies for dealing with both Jewish war refugees and the problems of Palestine.

Following the completion of the report, Harry S. Truman sent a copy to British Prime Minister Clement Attlee, with respect to Britain’s responsibility for Palestine. Truman wrote "On the basis of this and other information which has come to me I concur in the belief that no other single matter is so important for those who have known the horrors of concentration camps for over a decade as is the future of immigration possibilities into Palestine."

The British responded negatively to the report; they blamed Zionist pressure for the report's conclusion regarding Palestine, and suggested that the United States should also take a share of the refugees. Attlee wanted the report kept confidential, but his request was ignored.

== Appointment and scope ==
President Roosevelt appointed Harrison as the U.S. representative on the Intergovernmental Commission on Refugees on March 15, 1945.

On June 18, the Jewish Agency in Mandatory Palestine sent a detailed and strongly worded memo to the British authorities requesting 100,000 immigration permits for Jewish displaced persons (DPs) in Europe.

On June 22, two months after Roosevelt’s death, President Truman asked Harrison to conduct an inspection tour of camps holding displaced persons (DPs) in Europe, on the urging of outgoing Treasury Secretary Henry Morgenthau Jr. Harrison was asked to inquire into the conditions and needs of those among the displaced persons in the liberated countries of Western Europe and in Allied-occupied Germany and Allied-occupied Austria with particular reference to the Jewish refugees who may possibly be stateless or non-repatriable:

(1) the conditions under which displaced persons and particularly those who may be stateless or non-repatriable are at present living, especially in Germany and Austria,
(2) the needs of such persons,
(3) how those needs are being met at present by the military authorities, the governments of residence and international and private relief bodies, and
(4) the views of the possibly non-repatriable persons as to their future destinations.

Harrison left in early July as the head of a small delegation, including two representatives of the American Jewish Joint Distribution Committee, Joseph J. Schwartz and Herbert Katzki, the latter also of the War Refugee Board, and Patrick Murphy Malin of the Intergovernmental Committee on Refugees. The group split up to visit approximately thirty DP camps; Schwartz went to the camps in Northern Germany whilst Harrison visited the US camps in Austria and Bavaria. In Germany, Harrison was met by US Army Chaplain Abraham Klausner who personally arranged to show Harrison the true nature of the DP situation in the region of Bavaria.

== The report ==
The report was dated August 24. It blamed U.S. military authorities for the horrible conditions it described:

Many Jewish displaced persons ... are living under guard behind barbed-wire fences ... including some of the most notorious concentration camps ... had no clothing other than their concentration camp garb.... Most of them have been separated three, four or five years and they cannot understand why the liberators should not have undertaken immediately the organized effort to re-unite family groups.... Many of the buildings ... are clearly unfit for winter....

Harrison contrasted these conditions with the relative normal life led by the nearby German populations and wondered at the contrast:

We appear to be treating the Jews as the Nazis treated them except that we do not exterminate them. They are in concentration camps in large numbers under our military guard instead of S.S. troops. One is led to wonder whether the German people, seeing this, are not supposing that we are following or at least condoning Nazi policy.

He wrote that to date U.S. authorities were handling DPs in traditional ways as national groups, but that conditions and the history of Nazi anti-Semitism required recognition of the distinct identity of these DPs:

The first and plainest need of these people is a recognition of their actual status and by this I mean their status as Jews.... Refusal to recognize the Jews as such has the effect, in this situation, of closing one's eyes to their former and more barbaric persecution.

He recommended to the President that 100,000 DPs in those camps be permitted to resettle in Palestine.

== Response ==
Truman forwarded the report to General Eisenhower, Commander of U.S. Forces in Europe. Eisenhower responded promptly with a series of measures that segregated Jewish DPs, found housing even if it meant displacing German locals, increased rations, and preference in employment, perhaps aided by information about the Report's contents before it reached Truman. Another immediate result of Harrison's recommendations was the appointment of an adviser on Jewish affairs to the U.S. Army, based on the recommendation of several Jewish organizations to the secretary of war. Rabbi Judah P. Nadich was the first, followed in October 1945 by Simon H. Rifkind, a New York City judge and municipal official. Finally, the Report focused the attention of the Truman and the U.S. military on the Jewish DPs. Truman wrote to Eisenhower on August 31:

I know you will agree with me that we have a particular responsibility toward these victims of persecution and tyranny who are in our zone. We must make clear to the German people that we thoroughly abhor the Nazi policies of hatred and persecution. We have no better opportunity to demonstrate this than by the manner in which we ourselves actually treat the survivors remaining in Germany.

It also highlighted Palestine as the solution and British control of immigration there as a crucial barrier.

Eisenhower replied to the Harrison Report with a lengthy update to Truman in mid-October, explaining changes in conditions and contesting Harrison's assertion, in Eisenhower's words, that "our military guards are now substituting for SS troops". He wrote that:

Mr. Harrison's report gives little regard to the problems faced, the real successes attained in saving the lives of thousands of Jewish and other concentration camp victims and repatriating those who could and wished to be repatriated, and the progress made in two months to bring these unfortunates who remained under our jurisdiction from the depths of physical degeneration to a condition of health and essential comfort.

Harrison responded in a radio address the next day that what Eisenhower viewed as improvements fell far short of what was required: "The point is that they shouldn't be in any camps at all, but in houses. Shifting them from one camp to another can hardly be said to be liberation."

Among those most displeased with the report was General George S. Patton, who oversaw DP operations for the U.S. and thus felt personally reproached by Harrison's findings. In journal entries from 1945 (as reported by Eric Lichtblau), Patton expressed disdain for Jews in the camps: "Harrison and his ilk believe that the Displaced Person is a human being, which he is not, and this applies particularly to the Jews who are lower than animals." In other entries, Patton described the utter squalor in the Jewish living quarters and makeshift synagogue, but Lichtblau adds:

Following Harrison's scathing report to Truman, conditions in the camps slowly became more livable, with schools, synagogues and markets sprouting up and fewer restrictions.

== Palestine ==
Harrison's report was part of the impetus for the creation of the Anglo-American Committee of Inquiry on Palestine, which was formed to recommend policies for dealing with both Jewish war refugees and the problems of Palestine. Harrison campaigned on behalf of his proposal in the months that followed, testifying in January 1946 before the Anglo-American Committee. In 1946, the New York Times called Harrison's work "the first official proposal for the immediate settlement of 100,000 Jews in Palestine". Harrison's report has been credited by some historians as a crucial step in the development of United States support for the State of Israel. In June he called for the United Nations to create an agency to address the problems of those uprooted by war, many now stateless, and he thought Latin America might welcome many of them.

British Foreign Secretary Ernest Bevin referred to the report in a speech to the House of Commons, a week after the London Conference of 1946–47 – Britain's last attempt to negotiate peace in Palestine – failed. In the speech, he blamed the Harrison Report for the ill feeling which ensued:

But I think we might have been able to do more for the Jews, and have increased this rate at that time, if the bitterness of feeling which surrounds this problem of immigration had not been increased by American pressure for the immediate admission of 100,000. I do not desire to create any ill feeling with the United States; in fact, I have done all I can to promote the best possible relations with them, as with other countries, but I should have been happier if they had had regard to the fact that we were the Mandatory Power, and that we were carrying the responsibility and if they had only waited to ask us what we were doing. Then we could have informed them. But, instead of that, a person named Earl Harrison went out to their zone in Germany collecting certain information, and a report was issued. I must say it really destroyed the basis of good feeling that we—the Colonial Secretary and I—were endeavouring to produce in the Arab States, and it set the whole thing back.

== See also ==
- Bibliography of the Holocaust
- Displaced persons camps in post–World War II Europe

== Bibliography ==
- Allen H. Podet, 1978, "Anti-Zionism in a Key United States Diplomat: Loy Henderson at the End of World War II," pp. 155–87, American Jewish Archives Journal
- Penkower, Monty Noam. "The Earl Harrison Report: Its Genesis and Its Significance". American Jewish Archives Journal, 68, no.1 (2016): 1–75
- Königseder, Angelika; Wetzel, Juliane (2001). "The Harrison Report and Its Repercussions". Waiting for Hope: Jewish Displaced Persons in Post-World War II Germany. Northwestern University Press. pp. 31–42. ISBN 978-0-8101-1477-7.
- Haron, Miriam Joyce (1986). Palestine and the Anglo-American connection, 1945–1950. P. Lang. ISBN 978-0-8204-0292-5.
