= Philippe Takla =

Lebanese lawyer, diplomat and politician

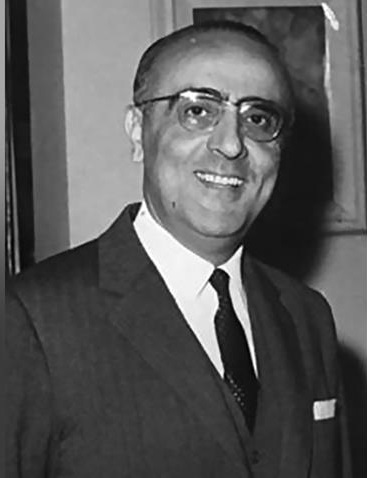
Philippe Takla

Philippe Takla (3 February 1915 – 10 July 2006) was a Lebanese lawyer, diplomat and politician who served as foreign minister.

== Early life ==
Takla was born into a Greek Catholic family on 3 February 1915. His father, Salim Takla, was a politician and a member of the Lebanese Parliament from Mount Lebanon.

== Career ==
Takla was a lawyer by profession. He was first elected to the Lebanese parliament in a by-election held in May 1945 in Mount Lebanon as a result of the death of his father, Salim Takla, on 11 January who was the deputy for the region. One of the candidates for the seat was Elias Rababi from the Kataeb Party.

Philippe Takla was also won the seat in the 1947 and 1957 general elections. He was the minister of finance from June 1951 to February 1952. He was appointed minister of economy in 1959. He was then named as minister of foreign affairs and of tourism in 1960. In 1964, he was holding the post of economy minister. Takla was the governor of the Central bank of Lebanon from 1963 to 1967.

In 1967, Takla began to serve as Lebanon's representative to the U.N. and then as ambassador in Paris from 1968 to 1971. In addition, he served seven times as foreign minister in various cabinets from 1952 to 1976, last of which was from July 1975 to June 1976.

== Death and burial ==
Takla died on 10 July 2006 at the age of 91. His body was buried in Zouk Mikhael.
