= Lebanonwire =

Lebanese online newspaper (1999–2015)

- Format: Online newspaper
- Owner: Farid Chedid
- Founder: Farid Chedid
- Publisher: Lebanon Wire Enterprise
- Editor-in-chief: Farid Chedid
- Founded: 1999
- Ceased publication: 2015
- Language: English
- Headquarters: Beirut
- Website: lebanonwire.com

Lebanonwire was an English news portal headquartered in Beirut, Lebanon and established in 1999. It provided news about Lebanon, the Middle East and other parts of the world. It was stopped in 2015.

== History ==
Lebanonwire was launched by Lebanon Wire Enterprise in 1999. Lebanon Wire Enterprise was also the publisher of the news portal which has an independent stance. Farid Chedid was the editor-in-chief of Lebanonwire.

== Content ==
Lebanonwire provided latest news about Lebanon, the Middle East and the world based on nearly 3600 sources as well as in-depth analysis of the news.
