= London Conference of 1946–1947 =

Debate over the UK's policy toward Palestine

Proposals for the Future of Palestine – July 1946 – February 1947, Cmd 7044

The London Conference of 1946–1947, which took place between September 1946 and February 1947, was called by the British Government of Clement Attlee to resolve the future governance of Palestine and negotiate an end of the Mandate. It was scheduled following an Arab request after the April 1946 Anglo-American Committee of Inquiry report.

The Conference's failure to reach agreements between Arabs and Jews regarding the future of Palestine led Britain to renounce the Mandate and "submit the problem to the judgment of the United Nations."

== Background ==
The London conferences are part of a long chain of discussions relating to the Palestinian conflict. Previous notable British involvement includes the White Paper of 1939, which exists in the background during the negotiations.

On 4 October 1945, it is mentioned in the British Cabinet's minutes that the foreign secretary would propose a solution before passing it along to the United Nations.

The Council of the Arab League had met at the Bloudan Conference of 1946 to consider the Anglo-American Committee of Inquiry report which had been published on 20 April 1946; recommendations resulting from this conference were sent to the British government. The Arab governments invited the British government to meet in order to reach an agreement ahead of the upcoming second meeting of the First session of the United Nations General Assembly:

... the conclusion of an agreement which will put an end to the present situation in Palestine and transform it into one in conformity with the provisions of the Charter and agreeable with its aims ... before the next Session of the General Assembly to be held in September, 1946

Additionally, one of the precursors to the eventual outcome of the conferences was the Biltmore Conference in 1942. The Biltmore Resolution was a declaration of a need for Jewish mass migration to Palestine and a creation of a commonwealth, with the belief that the rest of the Zionist movement would eventually agree. This led to the birth of the ultimate Zionist goal of a Jewish state in a portion of Palestine.

== First conference: Representatives of the Arab State ==
The British government issued invitations on 25 July 1946, just three days after the King David Hotel bombing, to the Governments of the member countries of the Arab League, the Jewish Agency for Palestine and to the Palestine Arab Higher Executive. Subsequently Abdul Rahman Hassan Azzam, the Secretary General of the Arab League as well as "prominent Palestinian Arabs" and "representatives of Jewish opinion in the United Kingdom and in Palestine" were invited. Neither the Jewish Agency for Palestine nor the Palestine Arab Higher Executive accepted the invitations.

Shortly before the beginning of the conference Eliyahu Sasson attempted to convince Arab figures such as Abdul Rahman Hassan Azzam to publicly endorse the Zionists' proposal for the dispute. Previous conversations Sasson had with political figures had seem to have gone in his favor, so his team went into the conversation optimistically.

The conference began on 9 September 1946, with only representatives of the Arab States in attendance, but without Jewish or Palestinian Arab representatives.

The first item for discussion was the Morrison–Grady Plan, which was to be rejected by all parties.

The British government later described the Arab reaction to the plan:

The Arab Delegates at once made it clear that they were opposed to this plan in principle and could not accept it as a basis for discussion. They criticized many of its features; but was clear that, fundamentally, their rejection of this solution was based on their conviction that any scheme of provincial autonomy would inevitably lead to partition.

The Arab Constitutional Proposals for Palestine at the London Roundtable Conference were the following:

(i) Palestine should be a unitary State.

(ii) It should have a democratic constitution, with an elected legislature.

(iii) The constitution should provide guarantees for the sanctity of the Holy Places, covering inviolability, maintenance, freedom of access and freedom of worship in accordance with the status quo.

(iv) The constitution should guarantee, subject to suitable safeguards, freedom of religious practice in accordance with the status quo throughout Palestine (including maintenance of separate religious courts for matters of personal status).

(v) The law of naturalisation should provide among other conditions that the applicant should be a legal resident of Palestine for a continuous period of ten years before his application.

(vi) The constitution should provide guarantees for (a) Full rights of citizenship for: (1) Any person falling under Part I and subject to (3) below, any person falling under Part II of the Palestinian Citizenship Order, 1925-41. (2) Any person who acquired Palestinian citizenship by naturalization before May 1939. (3) Any person who acquired Palestinian citizenship after May 1939 under the Palestinian Citizenship Order, 1925-41, and has been permanently resident in Palestine for a period of ten years. (4) Any person who in future acquires Palestinian citizenship by naturalisation under the new law of naturalisation referred to in sub-paragraph (v) above.

(b) The right of any resident in Palestine to apply for and acquire Palestinian citizenship on the same terms and conditions without discrimination on grounds of race, religion or language.

(c) The right of religious bodies or other societies and individuals to maintain, in addition to educational establishments administered by public authority, private schools and universities, subject to the compulsory teaching of Arabic in the schools and to Government control for the purpose of maintaining educational standards and preventing subversive teaching with the object of creating common allegiance.

(d) The right of Jews to employ Hebrew as a second official language in districts where they form an absolute majority.

(e) (1) Securing that electoral law for the Legislature shall provide for the adequate representation of all the important sections of the citizenry, as defined in sub-paragraph (a) above, provided that in no case shall the number of Jewish representatives exceed one-third of the total number of the members. (2) Securing that the constitution shall provide for the adequate reflection in the Executive and the Administration of the distribution of the representation in the legislature.

(vii) Unless and until legislation provides otherwise, Jewish immigration into Palestine should be entirely prohibited, and the existing land transfer restrictions should remain unchanged. The constitution should provide that any change in the above two matters can only be effected by law requiring the consent of the Arabs in Palestine as expressed by a majority of the Arab members of the Legislative Assembly.

(viii) The guarantees concerning the Holy Places should be embodied in a declaration made to the General Assembly of the United Nations by the Independent Palestine State, which would bind itself thereby that those guarantees should not subsequently modified without the consent of that Assembly.

(ix) The guarantees concerning the rights of the Jewish citizens which are prescribed in the preceding provisions should not be subject to amendment without the consent of the Jewish citizens of Palestine as expressed by a majority of the Jewish members of the Legislative Assembly.

(x) Machinery should be provided, through the establishment of a Supreme Court, for determining whether any legislation is inconsistent with the provisions of the constitution, and it should be open to any citizen of Palestine to have recourse to that tribunal.

The proposals describe the transitional arrangements that should be completed by 31 December 1948 and indicate the end of the Mandate and the independence of Palestine: establishment of a provisional government (7 Arabs, 3 Jews); preparation of an electoral registry (male suffrage); election of a 60-member constituent assembly (representation of "important sections of citizenry" according to their respective numbers). The drafting of the constitution should embody the following principles: a unitary state of Palestine; sanctity of holy places in accordance with the status quo; 10 years of residence for naturalization; compulsory teaching of Arabic in schools; Hebrew as a second official language in districts with a Jewish majority; end of Jewish immigration until enactment of a new law is approved by a majority of Arab legislators; and rights of Jewish citizens guaranteed and amended only by a law approved by a majority of Jewish legislators.

In early October the Conference was adjourned at the beginning of October as a result of the United Nations General Assembly meetings in New York; it then reassembled on 27 January 1947.

== 22nd World Zionist Congress ==
While the conference was on hold, the 22nd World Zionist Congress was held in Basel between 9 and 24 December 1946.

The 22nd World Zionist Congress discussed the aftermath of The Holocaust and the resulting refugees. It also covered the British response during The Holocaust and discussed existing tensions between the Jews in Palestine and the British forces there due to the Mandate. During the keynote address of the congress, Chaim Weizmann said that the Mandate needs to be revisited, and if it failed then the British needed to leave.

The congress described the Morrison-Grady plan as "a travesty of Britain’s obligations under the Mandate", unacceptable as a basis for discussion, and confirmed that the Zionist Organization could not "in the existing circumstances" participate in the London conference. The congress's demands were that:

(i) that Palestine be established as a Jewish commonwealth integrated in the structure of the democratic world;
(ii) that the gates of Palestine be opened to Jewish immigration;
(iii) that the Jewish Agency be vested with the control of immigration into Palestine and with the necessary authority for the upbuilding of the country.

== Second conference: Arab League and Palestine Higher Executive, with parallel Jewish Agency discussions ==
The conference restarted in January 1947. This time, a Delegation representing the Palestine Arab Higher Executive joined the Arab League states, and Jewish Agency representatives engaged in parallel via informal conversations with the British government. On 7 February 1947 the British government submitted a new proposal to all parties. The plan proposed a five-year British trusteeship over Palestine with the intention to prepare the country for independence.

The new proposals were later summarized by the British government as follows:

The proposed terms of trusteeship would include provision for a substantial measure of local autonomy in areas so delimited as to include a substantial majority either of Jews or of Arabs. The High Commissioner would retain responsibility for protecting the minorities in these areas. At the centre, the High commissioner would endeavour to form a representative Advisory council. At the end of four years, a Constituent Assembly would be elected. If agreement was reached between a majority of the Arab representatives a majority of the Jewish representatives in this Assembly, an independent State would be established without delay. In the event of disagreement, the Trusteeship Council of the United Nations would be asked to advise upon future procedure.

The Jewish Agency rejected proposals that did not include an independent state. At the same time, the Arab representatives remained in the stance that Jewish immigration resulting in an independent state would result in "bloodshed." The Arab representative's counter proposals during the conference offered minority protection and citizenship for the Jewish population that choose to live in Palestine.

The new British proposal was rejected by all parties – the Jewish Agency, the Palestine Arab Higher Executive and the Arab countries. The Jewish Agency requested that Palestine should become a Jewish State, that Jewish immigration should be permitted up to the full extent of the country's economic absorptive capacity and “a viable Jewish State in an adequate area of Palestine.”

== Outcome ==
On 14 February 1947, as reported in The New York Times, a "joint British-Arab" statement was issued that stated that the Foreign Secretary, Ernest Bevin, that there were not any eligible proposals proposed during Conference. In the statement, it iterates that unacceptable proposals, as deemed by the Arab delegates include "any form of partition or Jewish immigration."

On 18 February 1947, immediately following the conference, foreign secretary Ernest Bevin announced that Britain was unable to solve the problem and would pass it to the United Nations to propose a solution:

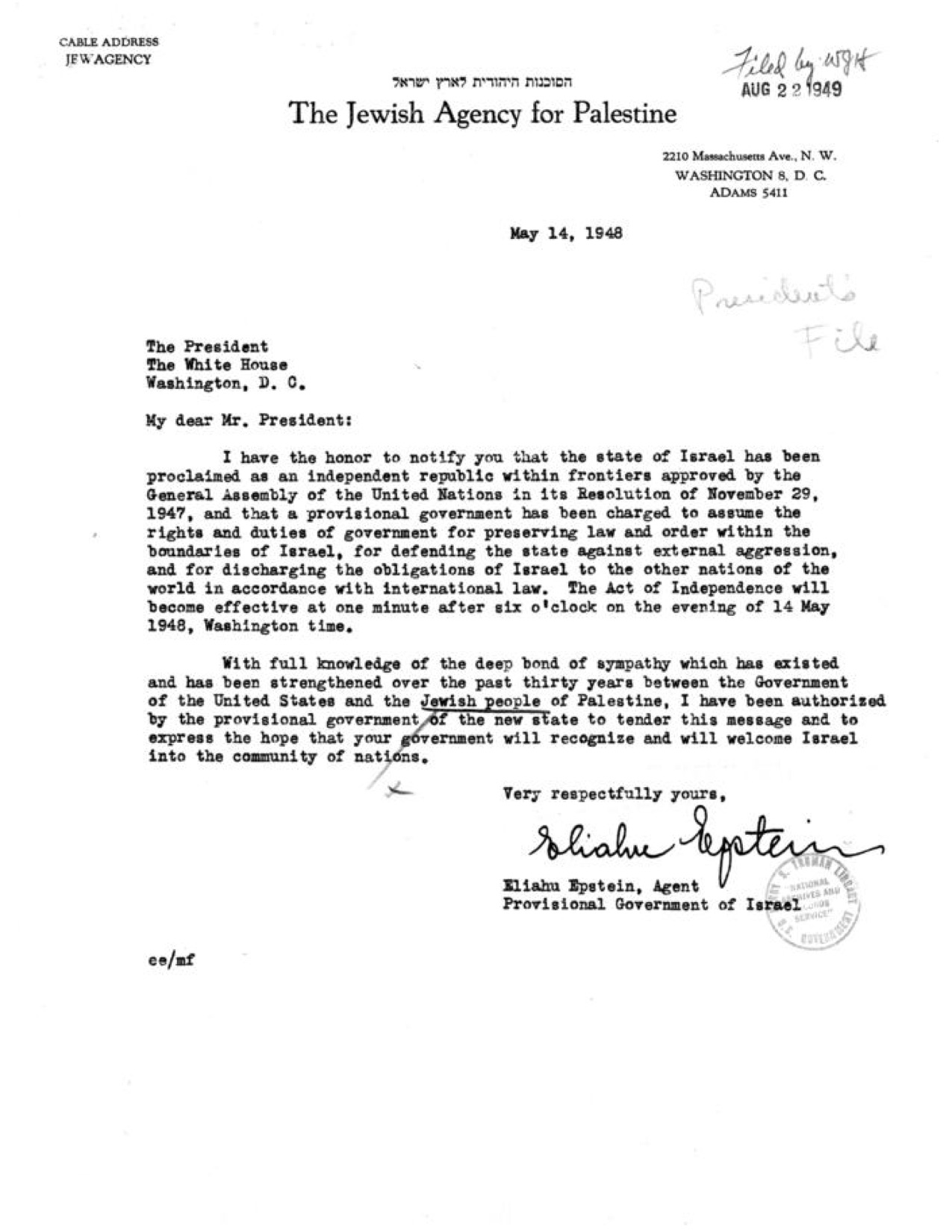
Letter from Eliahu Epstein to Harry S Truman, May 14, 1948: "My dear Mr. President, I have the honor to notify you that the State of Israel has been proclaimed as an independent republic within the frontiers approved by the General Assembly of the United Nations in its Resolution of November 29, 1947"

His Majesty's Government have of themselves no power, under the terms of the Mandate, to award the country either to the Arabs or to the Jews, or even to partition it between them. It is in these circumstances that we have decided that we are unable to accept the scheme put forward either by the Arabs or by the Jews, or to impose ourselves a solution of our own. We have, therefore, reached the conclusion that the only course now open to us is to submit the problem to the judgment of the United Nations. We intend to place before them an historical account of the way in which His Majesty's Government have discharged their trust in Palestine over the last 25 years. We shall explain that the Mandate has proved to be unworkable in practice, and that the obligations undertaken to the two communities in Palestine have been shown to be irreconcilable. We shall describe the various proposals which have been put forward for dealing with the situation, namely, the Arab Plan, the Zionists' aspirations, so far as we have been able to ascertain them, the proposals of the Anglo-American Committee, and the various proposals which we ourselves have put forward. We shall then ask the United Nations to consider our report, and to recommend a settlement of the problem. We do not intend ourselves to recommend any particular solution.

The United Nations Special Committee on Palestine was formed on 15 May 1947. The committee made an effort to combine input from Palestinian and American Zionist organizations.

== Reception and American Response ==
=== President Truman ===
==== Pre-Conferences ====
A press statement made by President Truman on October 4, 1946, advocating for the Jewish Agency proposal effectively "torpedoed" British plans for the conference.

Bevin blamed Truman for the failure of the conference in a speech a week after he announced its failure; according to Professor Arieh Kochavi, "Bevin was furious at what he regarded as the President's bowing to American Jewish political pressure." Bevin's speech was widely attacked in the United States. Truman commented on the matter in detail in his memoirs.

=== Series of Events After the Issue was Passed Along to the United Nations ===
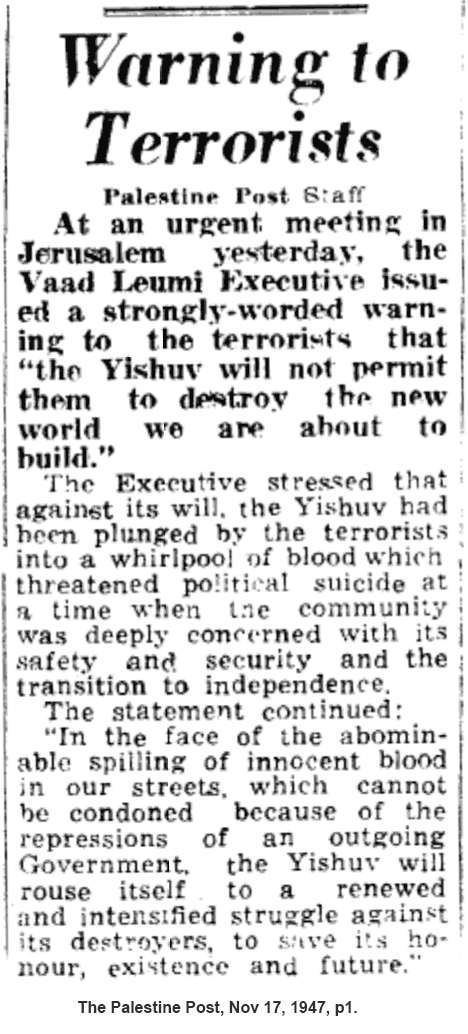
Clipping from the era of Mandatory Palestine, published between the London Conference and the UN's decision. Vaad Leumi of Palestine issues a warning to Jewish terrorists two weeks before the UN partition decision. The Palestine Post (newspaper), Nov 17, 1947, page 1.

The United Nations Partition Plan for Palestine in November 1947 was the result of the issue passing along into the UN's hands. This then resulted in the 1947–1948 civil war in Mandatory Palestine between Jews and Arabs.

==== Trusteeship Plan ====
President Truman announced the American trusteeship proposal for Palestine in March 1948 in response to the then-ongoing civil war between the Arabs and Jews in Palestine. The idea of a trusteeship was floating around during and after the last of the London conferences.

== See also ==
- World Zionist Congress
- American trusteeship proposal for Palestine

== Bibliography ==
- H. Levenberg, Bevin's Disillusionment: The London Conference, Autumn 1946, Middle Eastern Studies, Vol. 27, No. 4 (Oct., 1991), pp. 615–630
- Mirian Joyce Haron (1981). "The British Decision to Give the Palestine Question to the United Nations". Middle Eastern Studies. 17 (2). Taylor & Francis, Ltd.: 241–248. doi:10.1080/00263208108700469. JSTOR 4282830.
- Abcarius, M.F. (nd) Palestine. Through the Fog of Propaganda. Hutchinson.
- Cohen, Aharon (1970) Israel and the Arab World. W.H. Allen. ISBN 0 491 00003 0.
- Israel Pocket Library (1973) History From 1880. Ketter Books, Jerusalem.
- Kayyali, Abdul-Wahhab Said (1981) Palestine. A Modern History Croom Helm. ISBN 086199-007-2.
- Segev, Tom (2000) One Palestine, Complete - Jews and Arabs under the British Mandate. Little, Brown & Co. ISBN 0-316-64859-0.
- Teveth, Shabtai (1987) Ben-Gurion. The Burning Ground. 1886–1948. Houghton Mifflin. ISBN 0-395-35409-9.
- Weizmann, Chaim (1949) Trial and Error. Hamish Hamilton. (2nd edition. April 1949).
- The Political History of Palestine under British Administration His Britannic Majesty's Government, Presented in 1947 to the United Nations Special Committee on Palestine, Jerusalem, 1947
- A. M. Rosenthal, "Palestine Termed 'Hottest' Case To Be Submitted for U.N. Action" The New York Times, 15 February 1947, pp. 5.
- Caplan, Neil; Sela, Avraham (1987). "Zionist-Egyptian Negotiations and the Partition of Palestine, 1946". Jerusalem Quarterly. 41: 19–30.
- Egan, Charles E. "British Put Palestine Up to U.N." The New York Times. pp. 1, 5.
- Great Britain, Cabinet,128/1, Cabinet Minutes, 1945, 39, 9 October 1945, Public Records Office, London.
  - Specific file can be found here.

== External sources ==
- Pathe Newsreel of Conference Opening
