= Al Amal (Lebanon) =

Lebanese newspaper

- Type: Weekly newspaper
- Owner: Kataeb Party
- Founded: 1939; 86 years ago
- Political alignment: Right-wing political stance
- Language: Arabic; French
- Headquarters: Beirut
- Country: Lebanon
- Sister newspapers: Le Reveil; Action

Al Amal (Arabic: العمل, lit. 'The Work') is a long-running Arabic Lebanese newspaper affiliated with the Kataeb Party. It is published in Arabic and in French on a weekly basis in Beirut, Lebanon.

== History and profile ==
Al Amal was founded in 1939. The paper is headquartered in Beirut, and had Arabic and French editions. It is the official publication of the Kataeb Party, also known as Phalangist Party, and has a right-wing approach. In the early period the publisher of the paper was Pierre Gemayel, leader of the Kataeb Party. Until 1946 Al Amal was distributed with another Kataeb paper entitled Action which was published in French. From 21 November 1946 Al Amal became an Arabic daily newspaper, and Action was made a separate French-language weekly newspaper on 3 October 1948.

Its major function is to convey the party's views and ideas. In the 1940s Al Amal frequently published anti-Israeli news and articles. From 1945 it also frequently criticized the Lebanese government. The membership of the Kataeb Party significantly increased following the crisis in 1958 which also increased the significance of the paper. However, during this turmoil Fuad Haddad, editor-in-chief of Al Amal, was kidnapped on 23 September. Subscription to the newspaper became compulsory for all Kataeb Party members in 1966.

The paper had an oppositional stance against the Palestinian refugees in the country in 1980. In the 1980s Al Amal was published daily, but later its frequency was switched to weekly. In October 1985 Elie Hobeika, a militia commander, unsuccessfully attempted to suspend the publication of Al Amal. However, he seized the headquarters of Le Reveil, a French-language daily founded by Amine Gemayel. Following the control of the party by the Lebanese Forces, namely Elie Hobeika and Samir Geagea, Al Amal was for a time temporarily controlled by the group in 1986, but now reflects solely the points of view of the Phalange which is its license holder.

The circulation of Al Amal was 35,000 copies in the beginning of the 2000s.

== Editors and contributors ==
The long-term editors-in-chief of the paper were Elias Rababi and Joseph Abu Khalil. Both were also the leading figures of the Phalangist Party in the 1940s. Another editor-in-chief of Al Amal was Fuad Haddad who was abducted while serving in the post on 23 September 1958. Lebanese caricaturist Pierre Sadek contributed to the newspaper.
