= Al-Ittihad (Lebanese newspaper) =

Lebanese newspaper

Al-Ittihad الاتحاد
- Type: Daily newspaper
- Format: Broadsheet
- Editor-in-chief: Mustafa Nasser
- Founded: 23 October 2017
- Ceased publication: 29 December 2017
- Language: Arabic

Al-Ittihad (Arabic: الاتحاد, lit. 'The Union') also known as Al-Ittihad al-Lubnani (The Lebanese Union) was a Lebanese newspaper established in 2017. It was published in Arabic with both a print and online site that offered a pdf issue of the actual print issues. The original licence for Al-Ittihad was given to the journalist Zeidan Zeidan almost a hundred years earlier, but the newspaper had not been published for a long time. The present owner of the newspaper licence was Mustafa Nasser who was also the daily's editor-in-chief.

The newspaper was launched on 23 October 2017. Al-Ittihad ceased publication on 29 December 2017. On its front page, the newspaper cited a combination of financial and political reasons behind its closure. (in Arabic) The short-lived Al Ittihad published only 54 issues before folding.

== See also ==
- List of newspapers in Lebanon
