= Arz von Wasegg =

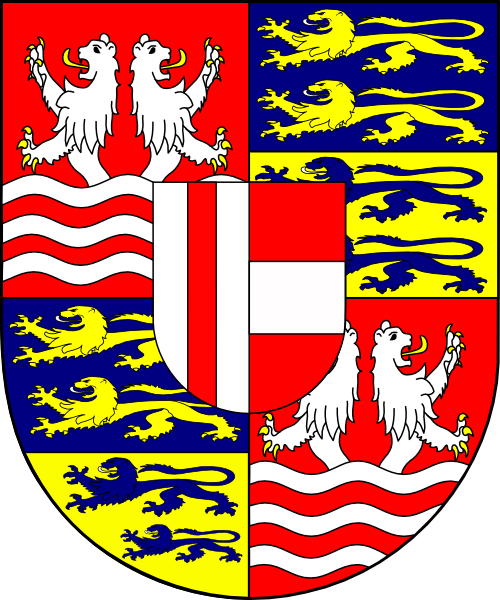
Coat of arms of Edmund Maria Josef Arz von und zu Vasegg, Bishop of Vienna

The Arz von Wasegg family (also Arz von Arzio-Wasegg, Arz von und zu Vasegg, and Arz-Vasegg) is an old South Tyrolean noble family.

== History ==
The family first appeared in a written document in 1007. They were noted as having estates there since at least 1472. The family eventually became hereditary chamberlains of the Prince-Bishopric of Trient and were raised to the counthood in August 1648. In the 19th century, branches lived in Austria and Prussia.
