= Syrie (Beirut) =

French daily newspaper published in Lebanon

- Type: Daily newspaper
- Publisher: French High Commission
- Founded: 1917
- Language: French language
- Headquarters: Beirut

Syrie ('Syria') was a French language daily newspaper published from Beirut, Lebanon. The newspaper was founded in 1917. As of 1937, its director was Georges Vassié.

Syrie was an official organ of the French High Commission. Therefore, it had a pro-French stance.
