= Le Reveil =

Newspaper in Lebanon

- Type: Daily newspaper
- Owner: Kataeb Party
- Founder: Amine Gemayel
- Founded: 1977
- Ceased publication: 2000s
- Political alignment: Right-wing political stance
- Language: French
- Headquarters: Beirut
- Country: Lebanon
- Sister newspapers: Al Amal

Le Reveil was a French language daily newspaper which was headquartered in Beirut, Lebanon. The paper was launched by Amine Gemayel in 1977 and published the French translations of the news covered in Al Amal, an official organ of the Kataeb Party. Amine Gemayel employed Le Reveil to support his political views.

One of the editors-in-chief was Jean Shami. Antoine Basbous was one of the reporters of the paper in Paris.

In October 1985 it was closed down by Elie Hobeika, a commander of Lebanese Forces during the civil war and the presidency of Amine Gemayel. Hobeika had attempted to shut down Al Amal, but he did not manage to stop its publication. Although Le Reveil has not been published since then, the license of the paper still belongs to the Kataeb Party.
