= Morrison–Grady Plan =

1946 Anglo-American plan for Mandatory Palestine

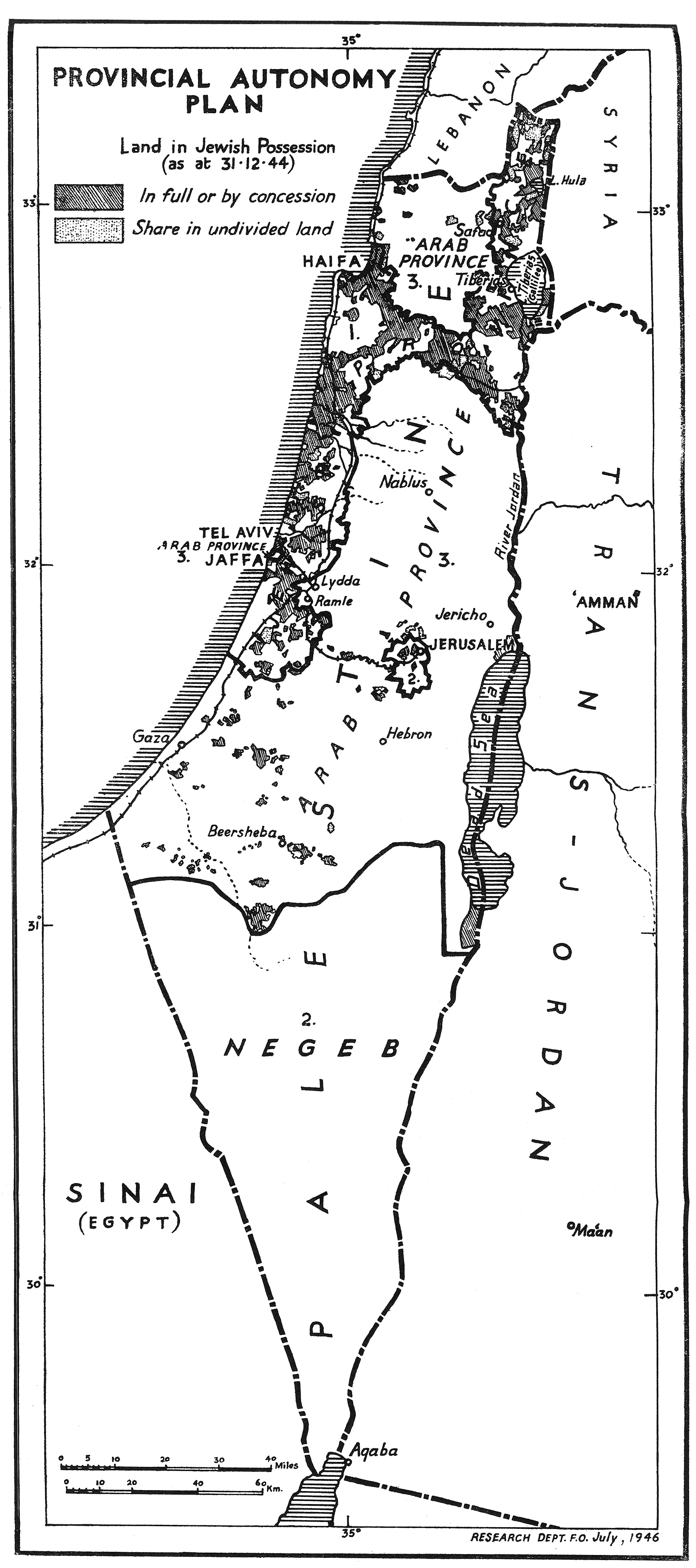
Provincial Autonomy Plan proposed by the Morrison-Grady committee

The Morrison–Grady Plan, also known as the Morrison Plan or the Provincial Autonomy Plan, was a joint Anglo-American plan announced on 31 July 1946 for the creation of a unitary federal trusteeship in Mandatory Palestine.

The plan effectively created multiple semi-autonomous states all maintained under British rule. The British were in support of this plan due to their desire to keep Palestine as their presence in the Middle East. The Arab League wanted the Zionist claims to be rejected and the British Mandate in Palestine abolished. The Zionists, with the support of the American government, opposed the Morrison-Grady plan due to its vagueness, which they interpreted as British leeway to exploit the agreement.

== Early stages ==
Following the issuance of the Anglo-American Committee of Inquiry report on 20 April 1946, a new committee was created to establish how the Anglo-American proposals would be implemented, led by British Deputy Prime Minister Herbert Morrison and US diplomat Henry F. Grady. Morrison presented the plan to the British Parliament on 31 July 1946.

== Immigration ==
At the Cabinet meeting on 1 August 1946, it was announced that over 2,000 illegal immigrants were proceeding to Palestine, with a possibility of detaining 8,000-9,000 Jews in Cyprus. On 7 August, the Cabinet decided to deport the illegal immigrants to Cyprus. This was thought to be the only way to thwart an Arab uprising, according to the ministers of the Cabinet. The decision was pending Truman’s decision about implementing the Morrison–Grady Plan. On 12 August, Truman announced that he was unable to support the plan. The next day, over 1,200 French and Greek illegal immigrants were detained and deported to Cyprus.

== Truman ==
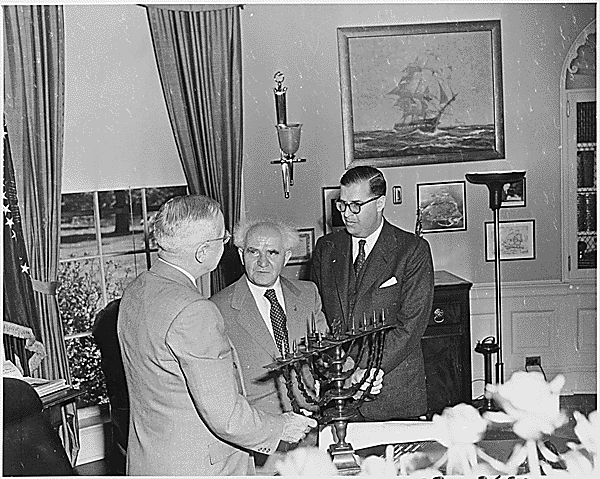
Truman in the Oval Office, receiving a Hanukkah Menorah from the prime minister of Israel, David Ben-Gurion (center). To the right is Abba Eban, ambassador of Israel to the United States.

In the United States, President Truman's initial support for the plan changed after American Zionist lobbying against it before the November mid-term elections. In his Yom Kippur Statement, in October 1946, Truman suggested a compromise between Zionist and British efforts. Zionists were ultimately discontented with his notion of "bridging the gap" between their differing autonomy plans. This was believed to be an indelicate attempt for the Jewish vote. The pressure from American Zionists resulted in President Truman rejecting the plan, despite it having been proposed by Truman's own appointee. The United States then had no Palestine policy. The plan became the point of departure for the London Conference of 1946–47, convened by the British on 1 October 1946.

== Content ==
Proposals for the Future of Palestine – July 1946 – February 1947, Cmd 7044

Under the terms of the Morrison–Grady Plan, Jewish and Arab provinces would exercise self-rule under British oversight, and Jerusalem and the Negev would remain under direct British control. The sectors would be Jewish, Arab, Jerusalem, and the Negev region, which would all be under the general control of the British. Issues would be left primarily in the hands of local authorities, but the central government would have the final say. This led to ambiguity around how much power the local districts would actually have, which dissuaded the Zionists and the American government from negotiating on its behalf. The proposed Jewish province was also very small and densely populated. The plan included a provision for the admission of 100,000 displaced Jewish Persons. Through the Morrison–Grady Plan, the British hoped to maintain influence in the Middle East in the post-war era.

== Reactions ==
American diplomat, Grady, insisted that the Jews had the "best land in Palestine," assuming the admission of around 100,000 from Europe under the British Mandate. According to The New York Times, under the Morrison-Grady plan, the Jews would be restricted to 1,500 square miles—a far more conservative number than the 2,600 that the Peel Report had initially recommended in 1936. Because of this, there was speculation that the British were attempting to construct a Jewish ghetto in Palestine. Truman denied these claims, noting that the "Jews get the best part of Palestine as their province."

The Arab states discussed the plan with the British at the London Conference of 1946–47, rejected the plan on the grounds that it would lead to partition, and instead proposed an independent unitary state. The Jews refused to attend the conference since they had rejected the provisional autonomy plan at a separate Zionist conference. They made their attendance conditional on having their detained leaders released to represent them at the table, which the British did not permit.

At a later meeting of the Conference the following February, Britain proposed a plan, known as the Bevin Plan, for a five-year British trusteeship. The trusteeship was to lead to a permanent settlement agreed by all parties. When both the Arabs and the Jews rejected the plan, Britain decided to refer the problem to the United Nations, which set up the United Nations Special Committee on Palestine.

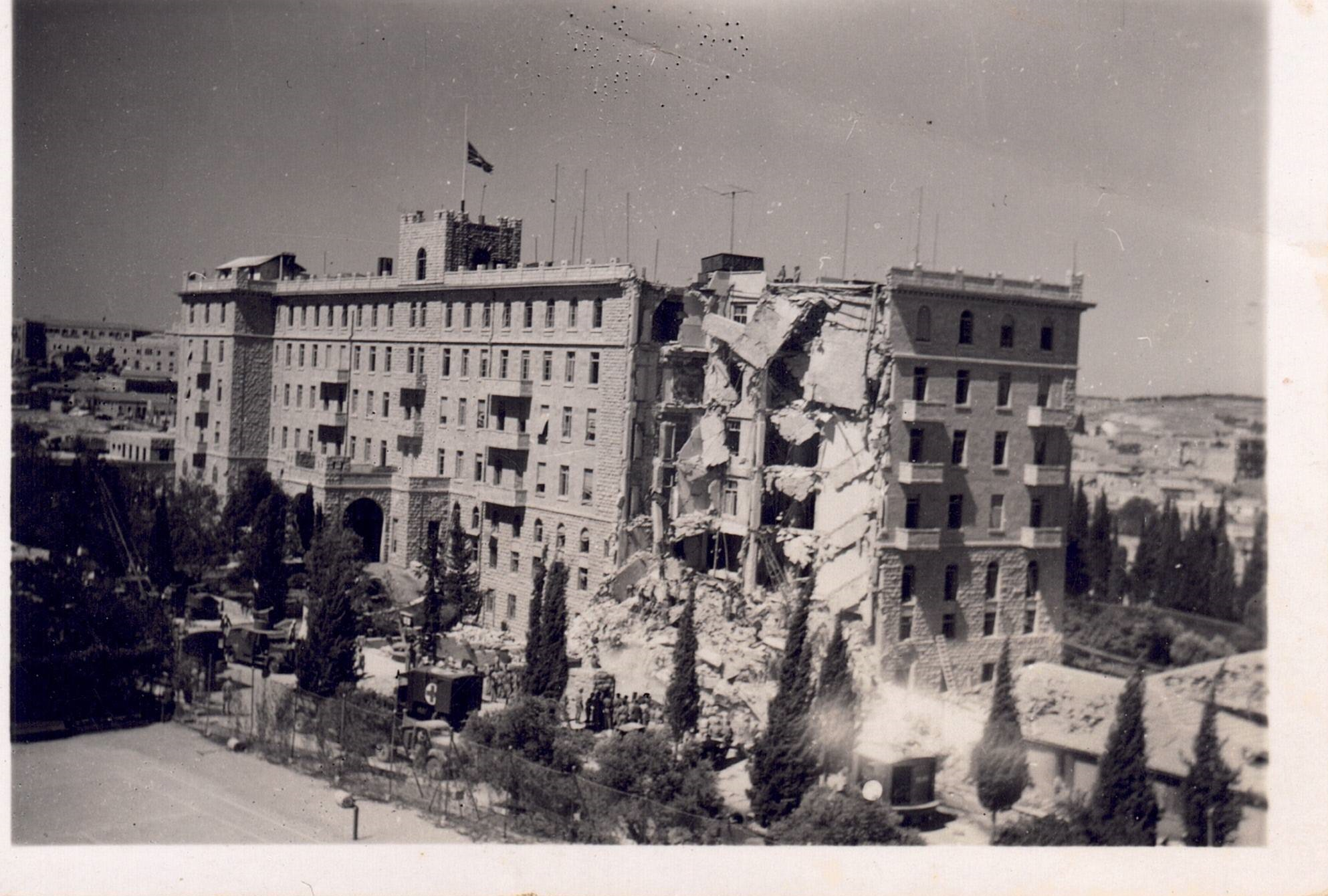
The destruction of the King David Hotel on July 22nd, 1946

Leaks acquired by the United States press led to a published account of the plan. President Truman was encouraged by his advisor, James F. Byrnes, to make a public statement in support of the Morrison-Grady plan after Byrnes' meeting with Clement Attlee and Bevin in Paris. Truman never made such a statement and the attack on the King David Hotel motivated the British to attempt to implement the Morrison-Grady plan.

In response to the plan, the Jewish Agency decided to settle the Negev in a scheme known as the 11 points in the Negev.

== Bibliography ==
- Bain, Kenneth Ray. The March to Zion: United States Policy and the Founding of Israel (Texas A&M University Press, 1979)
- Charters, David A. (12 June 1989). The British Army and Jewish Insurgency in Palestine, 1945–47. Palgrave Macmillan UK. p. 39. ISBN 978-1-349-19975-4
- Cohen, Michael J. “Truman and Palestine, 1945-1948: Revisionism, Politics and Diplomacy.” Modern Judaism 2, no. 1 (1982): 7. JSTOR 1396127
- Friesel, Evyatar. "Toward the Partition of Palestine: The Goldmann Mission in Washington, August 1946." Nahum Goldmann: Statesman Without a State, ed. Mark A. Raider (Albany, forthcoming) (2009).
- Grady, Henry Francis. The Memoirs of Ambassador Henry F. Grady: From the Great War to the Cold War (University of Missouri Press, 2009).
- Kochavi, Arieh J. “The Struggle against Jewish Immigration to Palestine.” Middle Eastern Studies 34, no. 3 (1998): 155-156. JSTOR 4283956
- Levenberg, H. "Bevin's Disillusionment: The London Conference, Autumn 1946", Middle Eastern Studies, Vol. 27, No. 4 (October 1991), pp. 615–630 JSTOR 4283465
- Ovendale, Ritchie (1979). "The Palestine Policy of the British Labour Government 1945-1946". International Affairs. 55 (3): 409. doi:10.2307/2615148. JSTOR 2615148
- Radosh, Allis, and Radosh, Ronald. A Safe Haven : Harry S. Truman and the Founding of Israel. New York: Harper, 2009. Pages 173-174.
- Spiegel, Steven L. (10 December 2014). The Other Arab-Israeli Conflict: Making America's Middle East Policy, from Truman to Reagan. University of Chicago Press. p. 24. ISBN 978-0-226-22614-9
- Wilson, Evan M. “The Palestine Papers, 1943-1947.” Journal of Palestine Studies, vol. 2, no. 4, 1973, pp. 33–54. doi:10.2307/2535630
