= American trusteeship proposal for Palestine =

1948 proposal to make Mandatory Palestine a UN trust territory

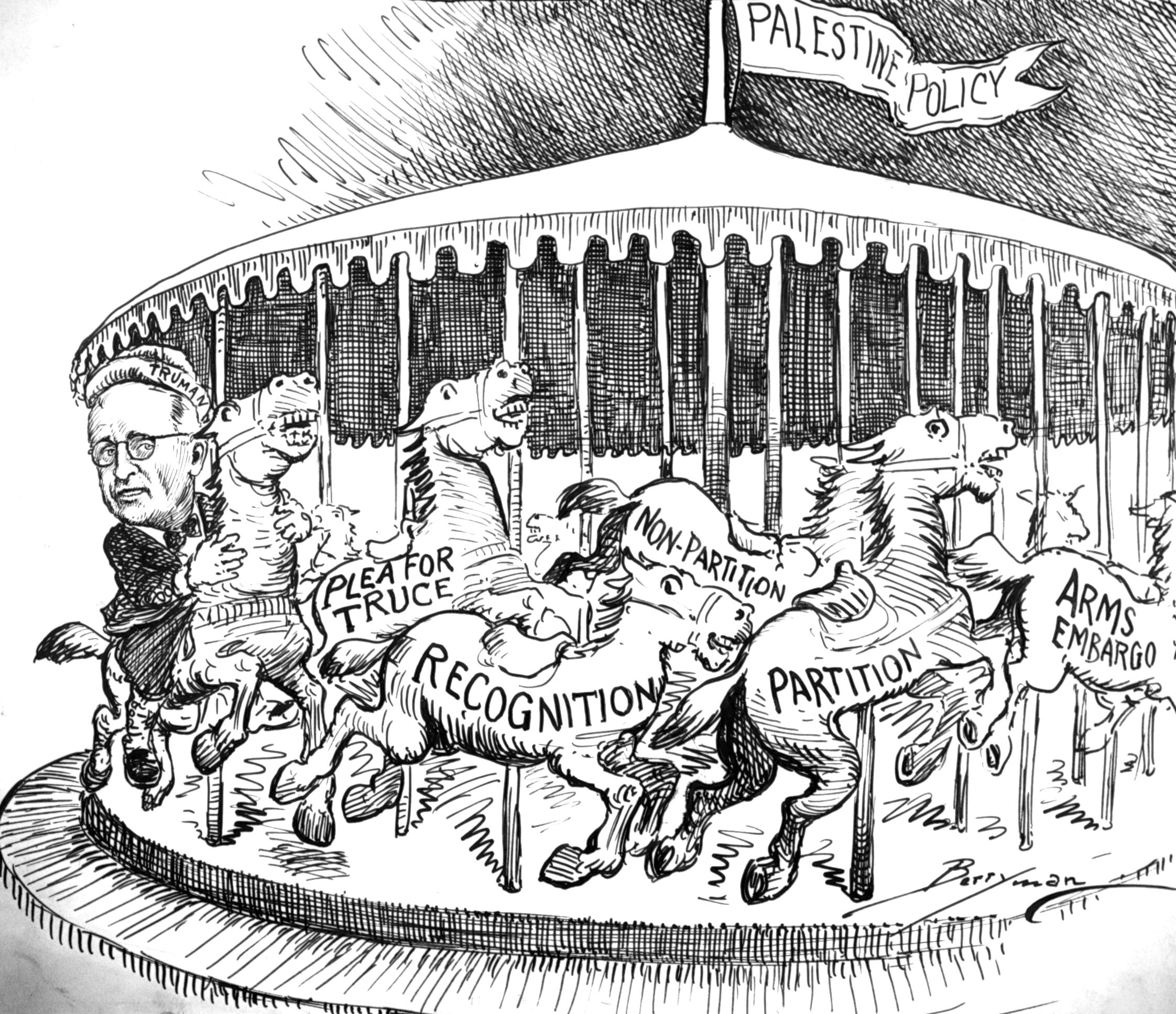
1948 cartoon by Clifford K. Berryman depicting the Truman administration's shifting policies on Palestine

The United States Proposal for Temporary United Nations Trusteeship for Palestine, announced by President Harry S. Truman on March 25, 1948, was a revised plan from the United States government for the future of the British Mandate for Palestine. The proposal came four months after the approval in the General Assembly of the United Nations Partition Plan for Palestine which had been vigorously supported by the United States, and represented a major shift in policy in response to the ongoing 1947–1948 Civil War in Mandatory Palestine. Truman was not against trusteeship per se, but believed that the State Department had gone behind his back. Ultimately, the US recognized Israel on May 14, 1948, abandoning the plan. The day after Truman recognized Israel, he wrote in a private letter to Bartley Crum that he still believed that the unitary state proposed by the joint Committee was the "correct solution", and they would "get it worked out that way".

== Background ==
The US vote in favor of partition spurred anti-American demonstrations in the region. On 17 December 1947, the State Department office of Near East and African Affairs warned that it would be dangerous if the US implemented partition by force, recommending two possibilities:

1. "The United States should immediately announce that we have become convinced that the partition of Palestine is impossible of implementation and that the Palestine problem should therefore be referred back to a special session of the General Assembly to meet in a neutral country such as Switzerland. At this session we should propose that a 'middle-of-the-road' solution be attempted for which we would endeavor to obtain support from the Arab and Jewish communities of Palestine. If this proved impossible, we should propose a UN trusteeship for Palestine, pending agreement by the Arab and Jewish communities."
2. The US should take the position that, in view of the manifest impossibility of implementing the partition of Palestine, no steps should be taken to that end. We should oppose sending UN troops to Palestine to enforce partition. We should maintain and enforce our embargo on arms to Palestine and neighboring countries.

The US diplomat George Kennan supported either "a federal state or trusteeship", arguing that a partition of Palestine might give the Soviets the opportunity to partition other countries - namely Iraq, Iran, Turkey and Greece - in the name of the self determination of national minorities. For context, the Soviets during the 1946 Iran crisis were reluctant to leave Iran, instead created pro-Soviet government for Kurds and Azeris in the Republic of Mahabad and Azerbaijan People's Government respectively. Kennan was convinced that partition could not be implemented without force. Dean Rusk, then director of Special Political Affairs in the State Department, argued that a change in US policy should only happen if the Mandate refused to cooperate for the success of the plan, if the civil war was too much for the new Jewish government to handle, or if the members of the UN refused to "meet their obligations to prevent aggressive acts by neighboring Arab States designed to frustrate the recommendations of the General Assembly". If violence continued and no solution was reached, he suggested that the US could consider a UN trusteeship for Palestine with US taking fiscal and security responsibility. In the report to the United Nations Palestine Commission on 2 February 1948, Rusk supported calling a special session of the UN General Assembly to propose a UN trusteeship for Palestine until the Jewish and Arab communities could agree on a transition to either partition or a unitary state. The Policy Planning Staff gave three options in a draft paper to Secretary of State George Marshall, either 1: the US giving all means of full support for partition (Note: In a meeting with Truman on 18 February, Alfred Gruenther estimated that enforcing partition would take 80 to 100 thousand US troops.), 2: taking a neutral role with no steps to aide or implement partition, or 3: calling a special session in the General Assembly to find an alternative to partition. The officials supported 3) but proposed 2) to allowing partition to 'die a natural death'.

The first public indication that the US would not support partition came in a speech by the U.S. Ambassador to the United Nations Warren Austin on 24 February.

The Security Council is authorized to take forceful measures with respect to Palestine to remove a threat to international peace. The Charter of the United Nations does not empower the Security Council to enforce a political settlement whether it is pursuant to a recommendation of the General Assembly or of the Security Council itself.... The Security Council's action ... is directed to keeping the peace and not to enforcing partition.

The speech was approved in advance by Truman, causing some resignations of Democrat party officials in Pennsylvania. Truman was not against this new policy, but he was concerned over the timing because he did not want the US to be blamed for sabotaging partition. On 14 March, the State Department was able to get the Arab states to compromise. The Arabs could achieve consensus on three plans, in descending order of desirability:

1. a democratic unitary state, with municipal autonomy and a limit on Jewish immigration at 100,000 for the next two to three years
2. a federal or cantonized state with similar immigration numbers
3. some form of trusteeship with similar immigration numbers

On March 18, 1948, the United Nations Special Committee on Palestine reported that it had been unable to arrange a truce and recommended a temporary trusteeship for Palestine in order to restore peace. The following day, United States Ambassador to the United Nations Warren Austin announced that the United States believed that the partition of Palestine was no longer a viable option. On March 20, United States Secretary of State George Marshall said that the proposal for a temporary United Nations trusteeship for Palestine was the only idea being considered that would allow the United Nations to address the difficult situation in Palestine.

According to the Truman Library, Truman wrote a number of personal statements in the following days recording his perspective ahead of the announcement on March 25:

- March 21, 1948: President Truman writes in his diary regarding the confusion caused by the State Department's handling of the trusteeship issue: "I spend the day trying to right what has happened. No luck. Marshall makes a statement. Doesn't help a bit."
- March 21, 1948: President Truman writes to his sister Mary Jane Truman that the "striped pants conspirators" in the State Department had "completely balled up the Palestine situation." But, he writes, "it may work out anyway in spite of them."
- March 22, 1948: President Truman writes to his brother Vivian Truman regarding Palestine: "I think the proper thing to do, and the thing I have been doing, is to do what I think is right and let them all go to hell."

On 2 May, Rusk told a Saudi prince that:

the President considers partition a fair and equitable solution for Palestine, subject to the conditions for U.N. action contained in the Charter and subject to our determination not to take unilateral action. ... If it were clear that such a state would be at war permanently with the Arab world or would serve as a base for hostile elements the U.S. obviously would not consider it to her own interests to see such a state established.

== The proposal ==
The trusteeship proposal was supported by Loy W. Henderson, head of the Near Eastern Affairs Bureau, who opposed American support for partition since he believed it would hurt U.S. interests in Arab countries. The proposal was drafted by Clark Clifford, White House Counsel and Max Lowenstein.

The United States has proposed to the Security Council a temporary United Nations trusteeship for Palestine to provide a government to keep the peace. Such trusteeship was proposed only after we had exhausted every effort to find a way to carry out partition by peaceful means. Trusteeship is not proposed as a substitute for the partition plan but as an effort to fill the vacuum soon to be created by the termination of the mandate on May 15. The trusteeship does not prejudice the character of the final political settlement. It would establish the conditions of order which are essential to a peaceful solution.

== See also ==
- United Nations Trusteeship Council
