= Al Arz =

Lebanese newspaper (1895–1916)

- Owner(s): Phillipe and Farid Al Khazin
- Publisher: Matbuat Al Arz
- Editor-in-chief: Phillipe and Farid Al Khazin
- Founded: October 1895
- Political alignment: Lebanese nationalism
- Language: Arabic
- Ceased publication: May 1916
- Headquarters: Jounieh
- Country: Lebanon

Al Arz (Arabic: The Cedar) was an Arabic language newspaper which was published in Jounieh, Ottoman Lebanon. It was in circulation from 1895 to 1916.

== History and profile ==
Al Arz was first published in October 1895. The paper was owned by brothers Phillipe and Farid Al Khazin, who were also its editors. They started the paper shortly after the appointment of Phillipe Al Khazin as an honorary dragoman by the French consul. The headquarters of Al Arz was in Jounieh, and its publisher was Matbuat Al Arz (Arabic: The Cedar Press) owned by the Al Khazin brothers.

Al Arz was a mouthpiece of the Maronite community in Lebanon and supported Lebanese nationalism. It supported the autonomy of Lebanon, and the Al Khazin brothers published articles in Al Arz claiming that Lebanon had historical "sacred rights" which should be protected by France. Some editors of the paper were members of a secret group, the Lebanese Renaissance society, which supported the independence of Lebanon as a state.

On 6 May 1916 both Phillipe and Farid Al Khazin were arrested and tried by the Ottoman authorities led by Jamal Pasha, last Ottoman governor of Syria, due to their support for the French policies. They were beheaded for treachery in Beirut, and Al Arz was shut down.
