= Anglo-American Committee of Inquiry =

British and American committee to examine conditions in Mandatory Palestine

Report of the Anglo-American Committee of enquiry regarding the problems of European Jewry and Palestine
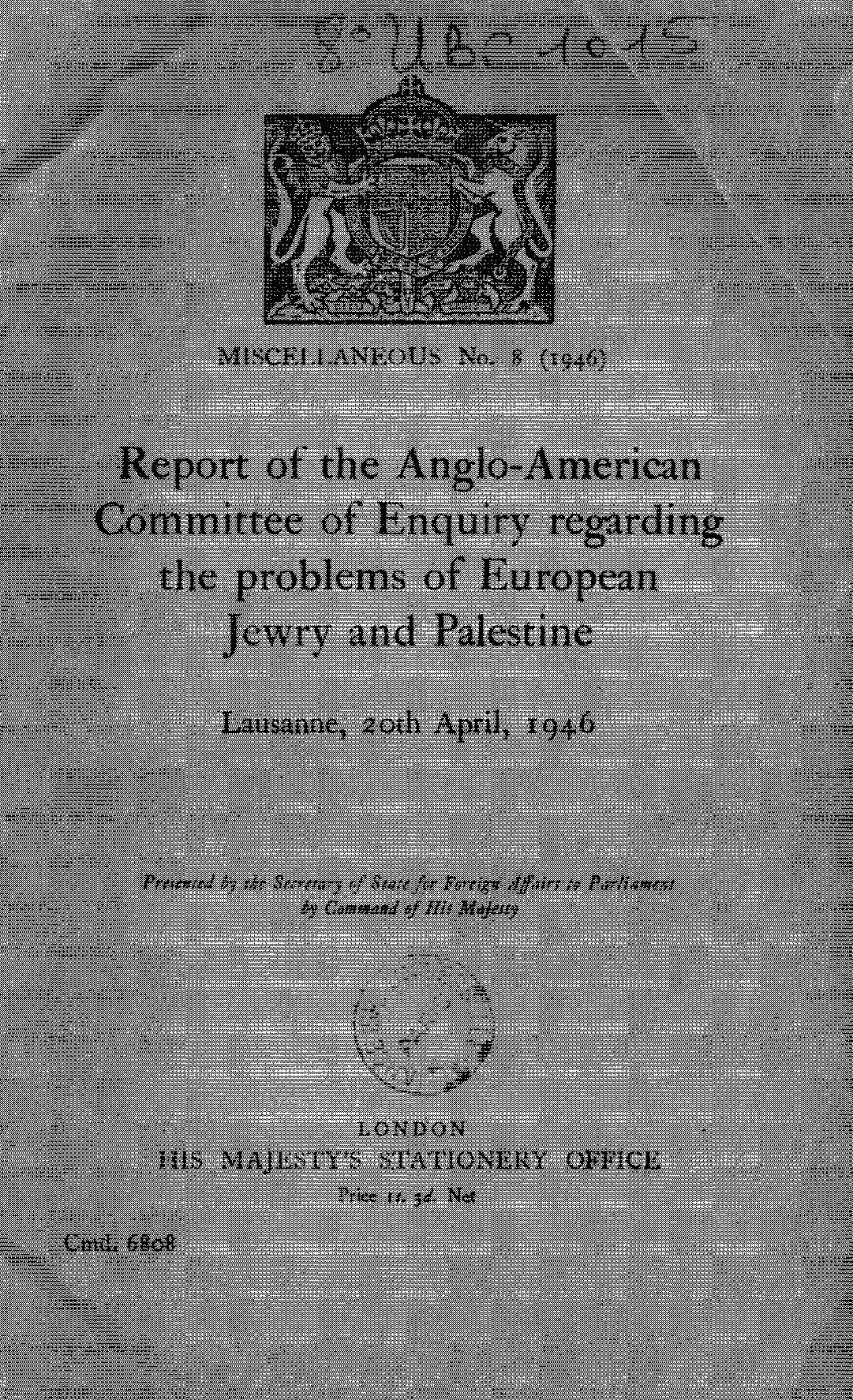
- The report; cmd 6808
- Created: 20 April 1946
- Location: Lausanne, Switzerland
- Purpose: To make recommendations for a permanent solution to the problems in Palestine

The Anglo-American Committee of Inquiry was a joint British and American committee assembled in Washington, D.C., on 4 January 1946. The committee was tasked to examine political, economic and social conditions in Mandatory Palestine and the well-being of the peoples now living there; to consult representatives of Arabs and Jews, and to make other recommendations "as may be necessary" for ad interim handling of these problems as well as for their permanent solution. The report, entitled "Report of the Anglo-American Committee of Enquiry Regarding the Problems of European Jewry and Palestine", was published in Lausanne, Switzerland on 20 April 1946.

World War II ended in Europe on 8 May 1945 and in Asia on 2 September 1945; in the United States Harry S. Truman had become president on 12 April of that year and in the United Kingdom Clement Attlee became Prime Minister on 5 July 1945. Following the Harrison Report, in August 1945 president Truman asked Britain for admission of 100,000 Holocaust survivors into Palestine, beginning a negotiation on Palestine between the two powers. On 13 November 1945, Attlee's foreign minister Ernest Bevin announced the formation of the Anglo-American Commission.

The British government suggested the joint inquiry in effort to secure American co-responsibility for a Palestinian policy, fearing Arab resistance to an influx of Jewish immigrants into Palestine. The report dealt with five subjects: immigration, land, form of government, development, and security. It recommended the admission of 100,000 displaced Jews, the annulment of the Land Transfer Regulations restricting Jewish purchasing of Arab land set forth by White Paper of 1939 and that Palestine shall be neither a Jewish state nor an Arab state.

The United States' decision to jointly lead the inquiry is considered to have been motivated by a desire to "clip the wings of political Zionism by treating the whole matter as a Jewish refugee problem". Moshe Sneh of the Jewish Agency noted on 11 December 1945 at an Inner Meeting of the Jewish Agency that "America's agreement to participate in the Committee was undertaken in order to strip us of our main argument...with which to appeal to the Americans against an English committee... the introduction of America is tantamount to disarming us." Scholar Amikam Nachmani wrote that the decision to include Palestine into the committee's scope was also not in the best interests of the Zionists. The British had conditioned the implementation of the report's recommendations on the admission of 100,000 new Jewish immigrants contingent on US providing assistance in case of Arab revolt. It wasn't offered and the British government continued to carry out its White Paper of 1939 policy.

The plan was the base for "The Morrison-Grady Plan", calling for federalization under overall British trusteeship. Ultimately the Committee's plans were rejected by both Arabs and Jews; and Britain decided to refer the problem to the United Nations.

== Background ==
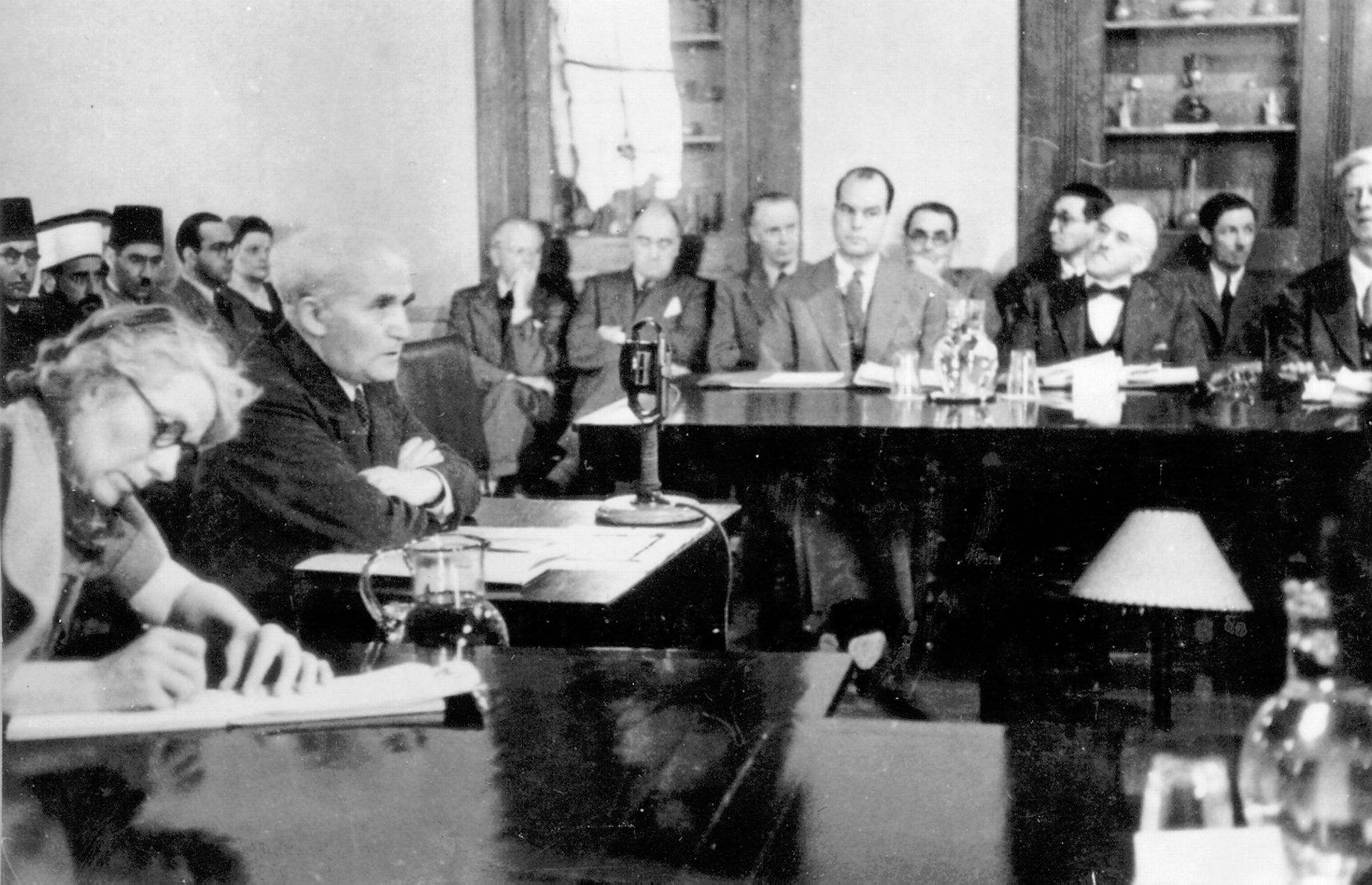
David Ben-Gurion testifying before the Anglo-American Committee of Inquiry

In 1917, Britain drafted the Balfour Declaration, becoming the first Great Power to support Zionist calls for a 'Jewish National Home' in Palestine. Shortly thereafter, Britain defeated the Ottoman Empire in World War I and as a result took control of Palestine. The Balfour Declaration was recognized by the Great Powers and incorporated into the Treaty of Sèvres. The Great Powers once again incorporated the declaration into the draft Mandate for Palestine that they submitted to the Council of the League of Nations. The US Senate rejected the Treaty of Versailles and as a consequence the United States never joined the League of Nations. The House and Senate passed a non-binding Joint Resolution, HR 360, 30 June 1922 favoring the establishment of a Jewish National Home in Palestine. On 21 September 1922, President Warren G. Harding also signed the resolution. A commission had been proposed by the United States at the Peace Conference as an international effort to determine if the region was ready for self-determination and to see what nations, if any, the locals wanted to act as mandatory powers. The report of the King-Crane Commission was not made public until after the Congress had voted on their Joint resolution. Public opinion was divided when it was learned that the Arab majority had requested that the mandate be administered by the United States, and that they intended to establish a democratically elected constituent assembly.

The rise of Nazism and the 1936–1939 Arab revolt in Palestine led the British to reverse the Balfour Declaration in the 1939 White Paper. This policy placed a limit of allowing 75,000 more Jews into Palestine (by 1949) after which Jewish migration was to be terminated. An independent state in Palestine with an Arab majority was to be established by 1948. In response to the White Paper, land sales to Jews were severely restricted by a 1940 law.

The end of World War II and the Holocaust left Europe with hundreds of thousands of displaced Jewish refugees. American public opinion supported a Jewish Homeland in Palestine, and in August 1945 president Truman asked for admission of 100,000 Holocaust survivors into Palestine but Britain persisted in opposing Jewish immigration, fearing damage to its extensive and vulnerable empire in the Middle-East. Britain ruled oil-rich Kuwait, The Arab Emirates, Oman and Bahrain. It also controlled Jordan and Yemen and had treaties binding it to Iraq (where the oil industry was British owned) and Egypt (where Britain administered the Suez canal). With the Jews in Palestine waging an underground war against the British occupation, the refugee situation was critical and British and American policy was at loggerheads.

== Committee ==
=== Members ===
The committee comprised six Americans and six British. Judge Joseph Hutcheson was the American chairman. He was joined by Frank Aydelotte, William Phillips, Frank W. Buxton (editor, Boston Herald), James G. McDonald, and Bartley Crum. The group was a diverse group of diplomats, scholars, and politicians, most in favor of the proposal that 100,000 displaced persons be admitted to Palestine. The British contingent was chaired by Sir John Singleton, with the remaining members being Lord Morrison, Sir Frederick Leggett, Wilfrid Crick, Reginald Manningham-Buller, and Richard Crossman.

The diverse mix of personal and political beliefs among the members of the Anglo-American Committee of Inquiry (AACI) significantly influenced their approach to examining conditions in Palestine. Many members considered themselves liberals or, in the case of Richard Crossman, a liberal socialist, which shaped their motivations and goals. However, there was a paradox in how their liberal motivations ran counter to their final recommendations, suggesting that basic racism might have played a role. This complexity reveals how the committee's liberal sympathies for Jewish suffering became a performative requirement, overshadowing an objective assessment based on international legal principles. The committee aimed to be a "straight and honest jury," but their deliberations and assessments were influenced by implicit norms and unspoken demands for standards of comportment, which were not purely based on the facts presented. This indicates that the committee's approach was mediated not only by their political and personal beliefs but also by the prevailing political epistemology of the time, which emphasized suffering, sympathy, and humanitarianism.

=== Evidence provided ===
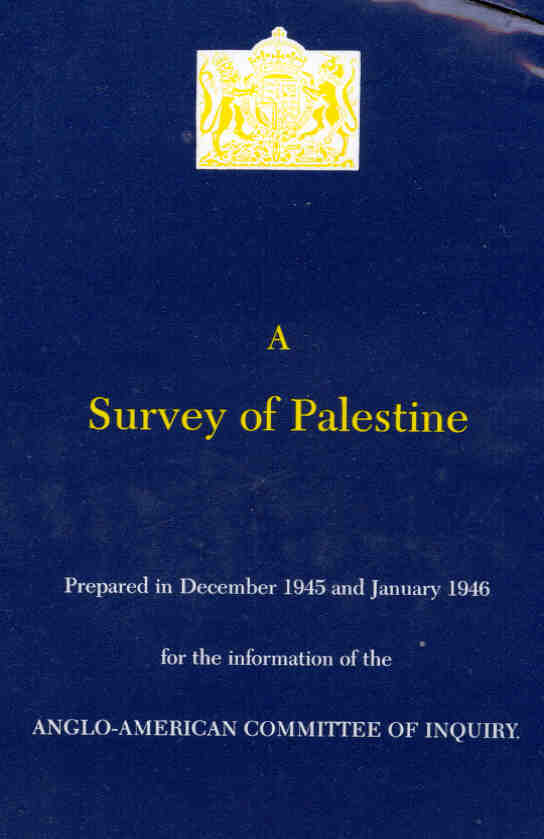
Front cover of the Survey of Palestine, prepared as evidence for the Committee

Evidence was provided by the Government of Palestine, the Jewish authorities and the Arab authorities.

=== Journey ===
The committee visited Washington, D.C., and London to gauge the official American and British policies and positions towards Palestine. They proceeded to Vienna, where they visited a displaced persons camp and interviewed Holocaust survivors. During their stay in Vienna they surveyed Jewish Holocaust survivors as to their preferred destination. 98% said Palestine.

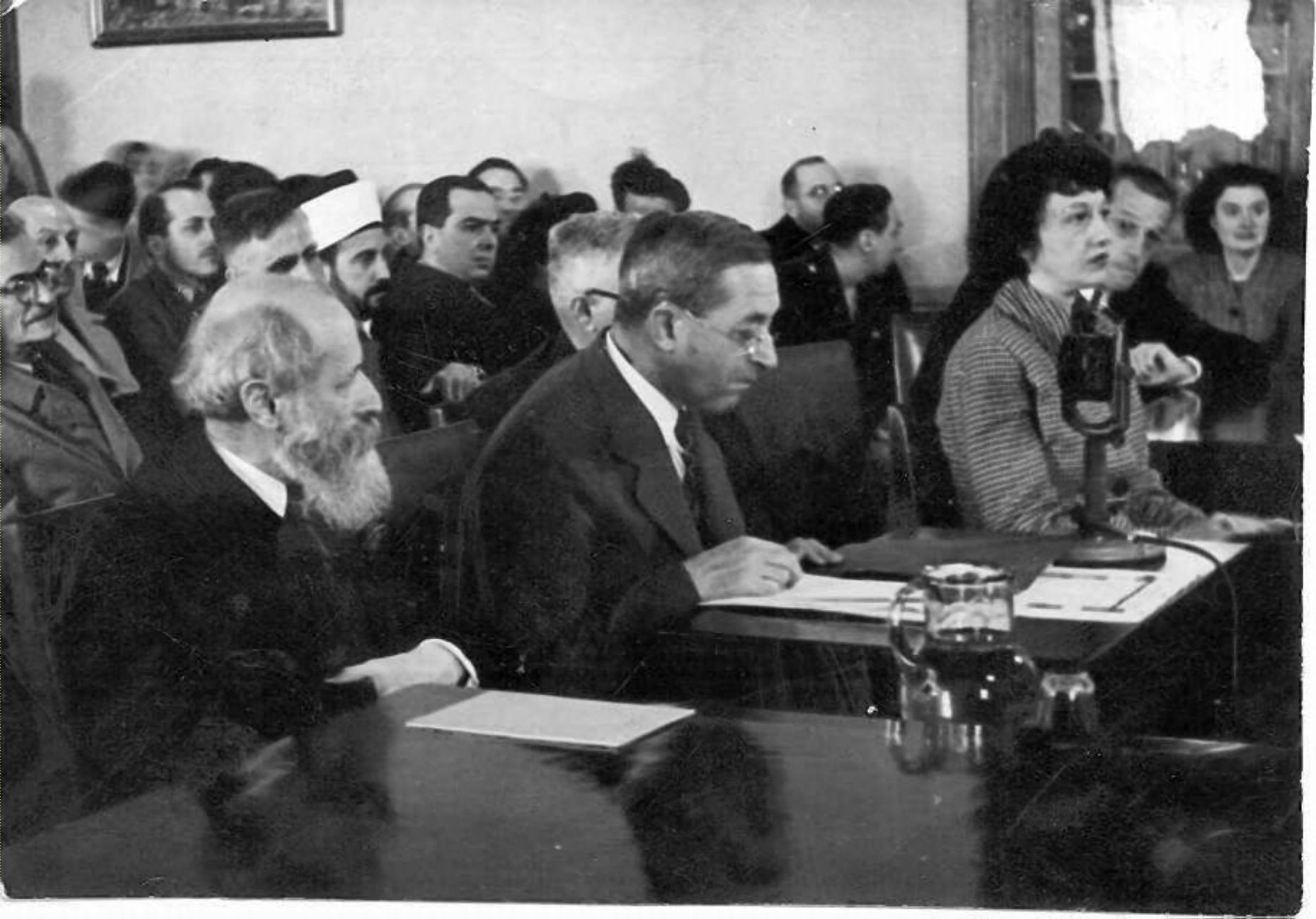
Judah Leon Magnes and Martin Buber testifying before the Anglo-American Committee (1946)

"In Poland, Hungary and Rumania, the chief desire is to get out, to get away somewhere where there is a chance of building up a new life, of finding some happiness, of living in peace and in security. In Germany also, where the number of Jews has been reduced from about 500,000 in 1933 to about 20,000 now, and most traces of Jewish life have been destroyed, there is a similar desire on the part of a large proportion of the survivors to make a home elsewhere, preferably in Palestine. In Czechoslovakia, particularly in Bohemia and Moravia, and in Austria, the position in regard to the reestablishment of the Jewish populations is more hopeful. The vast majority of the Jewish displaced persons and migrants, however, believe that the only place which offers a prospect is Palestine." (Anglo-American Committee of inquiry, chapter 2 paragraph 12)

The committee then traveled to Cairo and Riyadh to discuss Arab sentiments. At Riyadh, King of Saudi Arabia Ibn Saud told them: "The Jews are our enemies everywhere. Wherever they are found, they intrigue and work against us... we drove the Romans out of Palestine... how, after all this sacrifice, would a merchant come and take Palestine out of our hands for money?"

The committee then visited Palestine and spent three weeks there. They visited Jewish and Arab settlements, and heard testimony from many Jewish, Arab, and British officials. Zionist leaders presented statistics and argued that there were already several Arab nations, so the Palestinian Arabs didn't need their own state.

The contrary realities of Zionist and Arab existence left an enduring impression on the committee members. Aydelotte later reported: "I left Washington pretty strongly anti-Zionist... But when you see at first hand what these Jews have done in Palestine... the greatest creative effort in the modern world. The Arabs are not equal to anything like it and would destroy all that the Jews have done... This we must not let them do." Buxton compared the Haganah to the Continental Army, "a rabble in arms in the fine sense."

The committee members finally retired to Lausanne, Switzerland to debate and draft their findings.

=== Recommendations ===
During a committee meeting Bevin told the committee that he would accept their decision if it were unanimous Hence, In April 1946, the committee decided unanimously. Its recommendations were as follows:

Recommendation No. 1. We have to report that such information as we received about countries other than Palestine gave no hope of substantial assistance in finding homes for Jews wishing or impelled to leave Europe. But Palestine alone cannot meet the emigration needs of the Jewish victims of Nazi and Fascist persecution; the whole world shares responsibility for them and indeed for the resettlement of all "displaced persons". We therefore recommend that our Governments together, and in association with other countries, should endeavor immediately to find new homes for all such "displaced persons", irrespective of creed or nationality, whose ties with their former communities have been irreparably broken. Though emigration will solve the problems of some victims of persecution, the overwhelming majority, including a considerable number of Jews, will continue to live in Europe. We recommend therefore that our Governments endeavor to secure that immediate effect is given to the provision of the United Nations Charter calling for "universal respect for, and observance of, human rights and fundamental freedoms for all without distinction as to race, sex, language, or religion".

Recommendation No. 2. We recommend (a) that 100,000 certificates be authorized immediately for the admission into Palestine of Jews who have been the victims of Nazi and Fascist persecution; (b) that these certificates be awarded as far as possible in 1946 and that actual immigration be pushed forward as rapidly as conditions will permit.

Recommendation No. 3. In order to dispose, once and for all, of the exclusive claims of Jews and Arabs to Palestine, we regard it as essential that a clear statement of the following principles should be made:

- I. That Jew shall not dominate Arab and Arab shall not dominate Jew in Palestine.
- II. That Palestine shall be neither a Jewish state nor an Arab state.
- III. That the form of government ultimately to be established, shall, under international guarantees, fully protect and preserve the interests in the Holy Land of Christendom and of the Moslem and Jewish faiths.

Thus Palestine must ultimately become a state which guards the rights and interests of Moslems, Jews and Christians alike; and accords to the inhabitants, as a whole, the fullest measure of self-government, consistent with the three paramount principles set forth above.

Recommendation No. 4. We have reached the conclusion that the hostility between Jews and Arabs and, in particular, the determination of each to achieve domination, if necessary by violence, make it almost certain that, now and for some time to come, any attempt to establish either an independent Palestinian State or independent Palestinian States would result in civil strife such as might threaten the peace of the world. We therefore recommend that, until this hostility disappears, the Government of Palestine be continued as at present under mandate pending the execution of a trusteeship agreement under the United Nations.

Recommendation No. 5. Looking towards a form of ultimate self-government, consistent with the three principles laid down in Recommendation No. 3, we recommend that the mandatory or trustee should proclaim the principle that Arab economic, educational and political advancement in Palestine is of equal importance with that of the Jews; and should at once prepare measures designed to bridge the gap which now exists and raise the Arab standard of living to that of the Jews; and so bring the two peoples to a full appreciation of their common interest and common destiny in the land where both belong.

Recommendation No. 6. We recommend that, pending the early reference to the United Nations and the execution of a trusteeship agreement, the mandatory should administer Palestine according to the mandate which declares with regard to immigration that "The administration of Palestine, while ensuring that the rights and position of other sections of the population are not prejudiced, shall facilitate Jewish immigration under suitable conditions".

Recommendation No. 7. (a) We recommend that the Land Transfers Regulations of 1940 be rescinded and replaced by regulations based on a policy of freedom in the sale, lease or use of land, irrespective of race, community or creed, and providing adequate protection for the interests of small owners and tenant cultivators; (b) We further recommend that steps be taken to render nugatory and to prohibit provisions in conveyances, leases and agreements relating to land which stipulate that only members of one races community or creed may be employed on or about or in connection therewith; (c) We recommend that the Government should exercise such close supervision over the Holy Places and localities such as the Sea of Galilee and its vicinity as will protect them from desecration and from uses which offend the conscience of religious people, and that such laws as are required for this purpose be enacted forthwith.

Recommendation No. 8. Various plans for large-scale agricultural and industrial development in Palestine have been presented for our consideration; these projects, if successfully carried into effect, could not only greatly enlarge the capacity of the country to support an increasing population but also raise the living standards of Jew and Arab alike. We are not in a position to assess the soundness of these specific plans; but we cannot state too strongly that, however technically feasible they may be, they will fail unless there is peace in Palestine. Moreover, their full success requires the willing cooperation of adjacent Arab states, since they are not merely Palestinian projects. We recommend therefore that the examination, discussion and execution of these plans be conducted, from the start and throughout, in full consultation and cooperation not only with the Jewish Agency but also with the governments of the neighboring Arab States directly affected.

Recommendation No. 9. We recommend that, in the interests of the conciliation of the two peoples and of general improvement of the Arab standard of living, the educational system of both Jews and Arabs be reformed, including the introduction of compulsory education within a reasonable time.

Recommendation No. 10. We recommend that, if this Report is adopted, it should be made clear beyond all doubt to both Jews and Arabs that any attempt from either side, by threats of violence, by terrorism, or by the organization or use of illegal armies to prevent its execution, will be resolutely suppressed. Furthermore, we express the view that the Jewish Agency should at once resume active cooperation with the Mandatory in the suppression of terrorism and of illegal immigration, and in the maintenance of that law and order throughout Palestine which is essential for the good of all, including the new immigrants.

== Aftermath ==
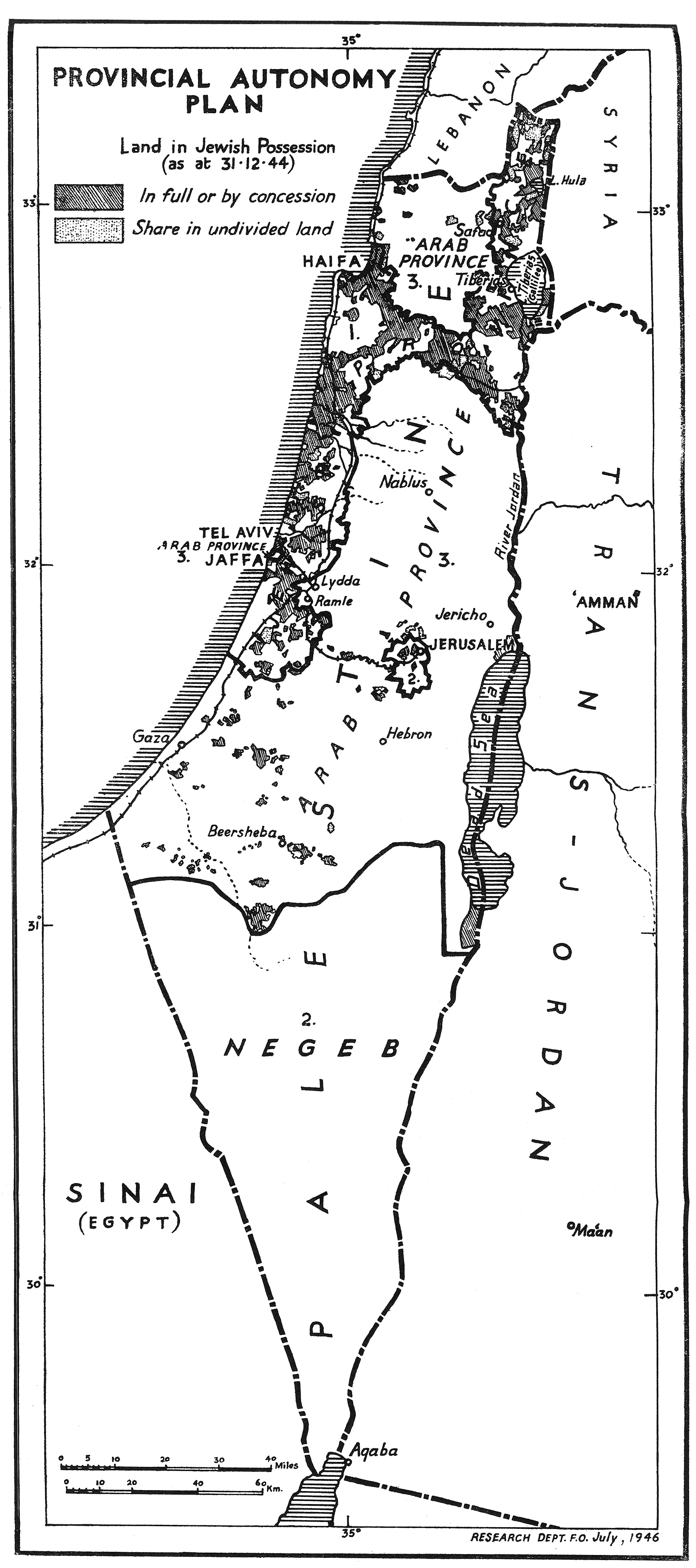
Provincial Autonomy Plan proposed by the Morrison-Grady committee

U.S. president Harry S. Truman endorsed the committee's recommendation that 100,000 Jewish refugees be immediately admitted into Palestine, and the right of the Jews to purchase land, but did not acknowledge the rest of the committee's findings, angering the British Labour Party. Within several days of the release of the committee's findings, its implementation was in jeopardy.

The British government and military believed that neither the Jews nor Arabs would accept the committee's recommendations. British Prime Minister Clement Attlee arranged a group of senior officials, who were to coordinate with the Chiefs of Staff, to prepare an analysis of the committee's recommendations. They concluded that the Jews would not accept anything short of partition, and that not only would the guerrilla raids by the Irgun and Lehi paramilitary groups continue, the Haganah might react by launching widespread attacks. In addition, the report concluded that there would likely be a general Arab uprising in Palestine with financial and material backing from the surrounding Arab states.

Although Bevin told the committee that he would accept their decision if it were unanimous, Attlee opposed the recommendation of a mass immigration. The British government, adamant that it would not bear the costs of resettling 100,000 Jewish immigrants, funding Arab development, and in disarming the Yishuv and suppressing any rebellion by itself, conditioned the implementation of the report's recommendations on military and financial assistance from the United States. The British cabinet agreed that the report should be rejected unless the US government was willing to provide financial and military assistance. Britain requested that the US government make two infantry divisions and at least one armored brigade available for immediate deployment to Palestine. The United States War Department had issued an earlier report which stated that an open-ended US troop commitment of 300,000 personnel would be necessary to assist the British government in maintaining order against an Arab revolt. However, the US government was, like the British government, eager to rapidly demobilize many of its citizens still under arms, and rejected the request.

In October 1946, the British government decided to gradually allow 96,000 Jews to immigrate to Palestine at the rate of 1,500 a month. Half of those admitted would be Jews who had attempted to illegally immigrate to Palestine and were being held in the Cyprus internment camps; the British feared that if the population of the camps continued growing, there would be an uprising among the prisoners.

=== The Morrison-Grady Plan ===
After the Anglo-American Committee issued its report, a new committee was created to establish how the Anglo-American proposals would be implemented. It was led by British cabinet minister Herbert Morrison and US ambassador Henry F. Grady. In July 1946, it proposed "The Morrison-Grady Plan" a plan for unitary federal trusteeship in Palestine. Jewish and Arab provinces would exercise self-rule under British oversight, while Jerusalem and the Negev would remain under direct British control. The plan became the point of departure for a Palestine Conference convened by the British on 1 October 1946. However the Arabs rejected the plan on the grounds that it would lead to partition, while the Jews refused to even attend. The Arabs instead proposed an independent unitary state. At a later meeting of the Conference the following February, Britain proposed a plan, known as the Bevin Plan, for a 5-year British trusteeship. The trusteeship was to lead to a permanent settlement agreed by all parties. When both the Arab and Jewish sides rejected the plan, Britain decided to refer the problem to the United Nations.

== Bibliography ==
- Cohen, Michael Joseph (1987). The Rise of Israel: The Anglo-American Committee on Palestine, 1945-1946. Garland Pub. ISBN 9780824049331.
- Howard Podet, Allen (1986). The Success and Failure of the Anglo-American Committee of Inquiry, 1945-1946: Last Chance in Palestine. E. Mellen Press. ISBN 0889462550.
- Nachmani, Amikam (2005). Great Power Discord in Palestine: The Anglo-American Committee of Inquiry Into the Problems of European Jewry and Palestine 1945-46. Routledge. ISBN 9781135779405.
