= 2023 in Lebanon =

- Decades: 2000s; 2010s; 2020s
- See also: History of Lebanon; Timeline of Lebanese history; List of years in Lebanon

Events in the year 2023 in Lebanon.

== Incumbents ==
Photo	Post	Name
	President of Lebanon	Vacant
	Prime Minister of Lebanon	Najib Mikati

== Events ==
=== January ===
- January 22 – The Lebanese Army declares a "state of alert" after stopping Israeli bulldozers and accompanying soldiers from approaching a border fence in Southern Lebanon. Peacekeeping forces from UNIFIL have also been deployed to the area.
- January 23 – Judge Tarek Bitar resumes his investigation into the explosion, 13 months after Hezbollah officials filed complaints against Bitar that prompted him to suspend the investigation.

=== February ===
- February 1 – Lebanese liquidity crisis: The central bank of Lebanon devalues the Lebanese pound by 90% amid an ongoing financial crisis.
- February 8 – A 4.1 earthquake in the Baalbek-Hermel area kills 1 person after a building collapses
- February 14 – 3 soldiers are ambushed killed by narco-terrorists in the Beqaa region.
- February 16 – Protesters set fires and break windows to banks in Beirut as the Lebanese pound devalues by more than 98%.

=== March ===
- March 28 – the Lebanese government reversed a decision to delay the shift to daylight saving time by a month.

=== April ===
- April 6 – 2023 Israel–Lebanon shellings: At least 34 rockets are fired, four of which landed, from southern Lebanon toward northern Israel, injuring three people. Israel later fires artillery toward two Lebanese villages and the Gaza Strip, wounding a Palestinian child.
- April 18 – Lebanon's Parliament decided to postpone the country's municipal elections for one year amid funding shortages.

=== May ===
- May 21 – In Sidon, Lebanese feminists protest after a woman is harassed over wearing a swimsuit at a beach.
- May 21 - Hezbollah stages a show of force in Aaramta, Jezzine for the memorial of Israel's withdrawal from Southern Lebanon
- May 28 – The United Nations suspends US dollar aid to Syrian refugees in after uproar.
- May 31 – Five members of the Marxist–Leninist Popular Front for the Liberation of Palestine are killed and ten more are injured during an explosion at a base in Qusaya.

=== June ===
- June 1 - The Lebanese military court charged five men with the December 2022 killing of an Irish peacekeeper during an attack on a UNIFIL convoy in the town of Al-Aqbiya.
- June 3 – Muammar Gaddafi's son, Hannibal Gaddafi, goes on a hunger strike to protest against his prolonged detention in Lebanon after being detained since 2015.
- June 9 – Clashes occurred between the Israel Defense Forces and Lebanese protesters in Kfarchouba and the Shebaa Farms, along the Israel-Lebanon border.
- June 25 – Lebanon's influential Progressive Socialist Party elects Taymur Jumblatt as new leader succeeding his father Walid ending his 46-year tenure.
- June 27 – The Lebanese Security Forces seize 450,000 Captagon pills headed to Gulf after a raid in a warehouse near the Beirut International Airport.

=== July ===
- July 1 – 2 people were killed in the town of Bcharre during clashes after a land dispute between the neighboring town of Dennyeh in Northern Lebanon.
- July 7 – One person was killed and three were wounded during a shootout in the Bekaa Valley.
- July 30 – 2023 Ain al-Hilweh clashes: Fighting broke out inside the Ain al-Hilweh Palestinian refugee camp in Lebanon after Islamist gunmen tried to assassinate Fatah militant Mahmoud Khalil, killing a companion of his instead.

=== August ===
- August 2 – The former Lebanese Forces coordinator in Bint Jbeil, Elias Hasrouni, was found murdered in his car in his town of Ain Ibil.
- August 5 – Saudi Arabia, along with other Gulf and European countries, announces travel restrictions and bans in Lebanon after the Ain al-Hilweh clashes and urged their citizens to flee the country.
- August 9 – 2 people were killed near a church during a clash between Hezbollah members and Christian civilians after a Hezbollah truck carrying weapons attempted to entered a Christian town of Kahaleh near Beirut.
- August 10 – Lebanese defense minister, Maurice Sleem, was hit with bullets which hit his car in a possible assassination attempt.
- August 23 – 2 military personnel died in a military helicopter crash during a training flight in Hammana.
- August 28 – The Lebanese authorities detain 2 Russian citizens for allegedly spying for Israel.
- August 31 – UNIFL's presence in Southern Lebanon is extended for 1 year after a United Nations vote.

=== September ===
- September 8 – 2023 Ain al-Hilweh clashes: Clashes are resumed in Ain al-Hilweh as the accused killer of the Fatah official was not handed over to Lebanese Judiciary.
- September 10 – 2023 Ain al-Hilweh clashes: A ceasefire is signed between Fatah and Islamist groups after three days of clashes in the Ain al-Hilweh Palestinian refugee camp in Sidon District, Lebanon, which killed five people and injured 52 others.
- September 11 – Clashes between rival factions in the Ain al-Hilweh Palestinian refugee camp in Sidon District, Lebanon, continue for the fifth day, despite a ceasefire, with ten more people being killed.
- September 21 – A lone gunman fires into the US embassy in Beirut. Motives are unknown.
- September 23 – UNIFIL intervenes to prevent a confrontation between the Lebanese Army and the Israeli Army near the Shebaa Farms.
- September 28 – An altercation between Lebanese Armenians and the Lebanese security forces takes place during protests against the Azerbaijani military offensive that recaptured Nagorno-Karabakh.

=== October ===
- October 8 – Gaza war: The IDF strikes Southern Lebanon after Hezbollah shelled an Israeli military post in the disputed Shebaa Farms region.
- October 9 – October 2023 Hezbollah strike: 3 members of Hezbollah are killed during an airstrike by Israel in Southern Lebanon, while two others are killed during a shootout at the border with Israel.
- October 13 – October 2023 Hezbollah strike: IDF rocket fire kills Lebanese Reuters journalist, Issam Abdallah, in South Lebanon while injuring 6 others.
- October 14 –
  - Shia Islamist militant group Hezbollah fires on five Israeli outposts in the Shebaa Farms with guided missiles and mortar shells. A Hezbollah member is killed during a subsequent gunbattle with Israeli troops.
  - Two civilians are killed during shelling by Israeli soldiers in Shebaa.
- October 15 –
  - One civilian is killed and three others are injured in a cross-border attack by Hezbollah in Shtula, Israel. Israel retaliates with airstrikes on Hezbollah positions in Lebanon.
  - United Nations peacekeeping force UNIFIL says its headquarters in Naqoura, Lebanon, has been hit by a rocket.
  - Human Rights Watch confirms that Israel has used white phosphorus in Gaza and Lebanon.
- October 16 –
  - A major fire breaks out at a market in the city of Tripoli.
  - Israel begins evacuating 28 communities located within two kilometers of the border with Lebanon amid clashes with Hezbollah.
- October 17 – Four people are killed by Israeli soldiers at the border with Lebanon after they tried to cross the fence at the border.
- October 18 –
  - Saudi Arabia tells its citizens to immediately leave Lebanon due to the deteriorating security situation in southern Lebanon.
  - Pro-Palestinian protestors took part in riots in the towns of Dbayeh and Aoukar. Businesses were vandalized and torched.
- October 19 – Dozens of rockets are fired at the northern Israeli cities of Nahariya and Kiryat Shmona from southern Lebanon, injuring at least three civilians. Hamas says its cells in Lebanon were responsible for the rocket attacks. Israel responds with airstrikes on Hezbollah positions.
- October 23 –
  - More than 20,000 people are internally displaced in Lebanon amid cross-border strikes by Israeli soldiers, according to the United Nations migration agency.
  - Israeli air raids target several locations in Lebanon including Ramesh, Markaba, Houla, Shebaa, and Kafr Shuba.
- October 28 – An Israeli shell hits the headquarters of the United Nations Interim Force in Lebanon, the second such incident since war began.
- October 29 – Reporters Without Borders says the killing of Reuters journalist Issam Abdallah in Lebanon earlier this month resulted from a deliberate strike from the direction of the Israeli border.
- October 31 – Amnesty International says they have found that "the Israeli army indiscriminately, and therefore unlawfully, used white phosphorus munitions in an attack on Dhayra, in south Lebanon which "must be investigated as a war crime".

=== November ===
- November 2 – Hezbollah launches a suicide drone attack on an IDF barracks in Shebaa Farms.
- November 5 – Three children and a woman are killed, and several others are injured, when two cars carrying civilians are hit by an Israeli airstrike near the towns of Ainata and Aitaroun, Lebanon, and four paramedics are injured when two ambulances are bombed in Tayr Harfa. In response to these attacks, Hezbollah launches an anti-tank guided missile towards Kiryat Shmona, killing a civilian. Three Hezbollah members are later killed in retaliation during a series of Israeli airstrikes.
- November 6 – IDF spokesperson Daniel Hagari says fighter jets have struck a "broad range" of Hezbollah targets in Lebanon in response to a barrage of rockets fired at northern Israeli cities.
- November 21 – Four Hamas gunmen, are killed by Israeli shelling in Tayr Harfa, Lebanon; the pro-Hezbollah Al-Mayadeen television station also claimed two journalists and a civilian were killed, shortly after the Israel Defense Forces said it struck several Hezbollah anti-tank missile squads in southern Lebanon and other sites in response to missile fire toward Metula, in northern Israel.
- November 23 – CENTCOM reports that the USS Thomas Hudner has shot down "multiple" Israel-bound attack drones launched from Houthi-controlled Yemen over the Red Sea. No injuries or damage are reported.

=== December ===
- December 1 – Israeli shelling kills a woman and her son in Hula in southern Lebanon.
- December 5 – A Lebanese soldier is killed and three others are injured by Israeli shelling in Odaisseh, southern Lebanon.
- December 7 – Human Rights Watch and Amnesty International find that Israel targeted journalists in an attack in southern Lebanon, firing artillery shells which killed one journalist and injured six others, concluding this was likely a direct attack on civilians and should be investigated as a war crime.
- December 11 – An Israeli artillery strike kills the mayor of Taybeh, Marjeyoun District, Lebanon.
- December 15 – The Lebanese parliament votes to extend the term of Joseph Aoun as LAF commander for one year.
- December 17 – The Lebanese Army rescued 51 people from a sinking migrant boat.
- December 23 – Four Syrian refugees were killed and a Lebanese MP nearly drowned after intense floods in Mount Lebanon.
- December 30 – UN Secretary-General Antonio Guterres closes the Special Tribunal for Lebanon after 14 years of investigating the assassination of Rafiq al Hariri.

== Sports ==
- 2022–23 Lebanese FA Cup

== Deaths ==
- January 11 – Hussein el-Husseini, 85, politician, speaker of the parliament (1984–1992).
- February 2 – Linda Matar, 97, women's rights activist.
- February 14 – Marwan G. Najjar, 76, scriptwriter and producer.
- February 14 – Mikhael Daher, 94, lawyer and politician
- April 26 – Sami Khayat, 79, comic actor, director, and writer.
- May 15 – Hassan Hallak, 77, historian, academic, and writer.
- May 22 – Elias Saad, 90, politician and economist.
- May 26 – Mohammad Jamal, 89, singer, composer and actor.
- July 1 – Habib Sadek, 92, poet, writer and politician.
- July 14 – Theodore Khoury, 93, Catholic theologian and historian of Christianity and Islam.
- July 24 – Ahmad Sami Minkara, 85, politician.
- September 28 – Najah Salam, 92, singer and actress.
- October 13 – Issam Abdallah, 37, video journalist.
- October 15 – Giselle Khoury, 62, journalist and talk-show host.
- November 21 – Farah Hisham Omar, 25, journalist.
