= 2022 in Lebanon =

- Decades: 2000s; 2010s; 2020s
- See also: History of Lebanon; Timeline of Lebanese history; List of years in Lebanon

Events in the year 2022 in Lebanon.

== Incumbents ==
Photo	Post	Name
	President of Lebanon	Michel Aoun (until 31 October 2022)
	President of Lebanon	Vacant (starting 31 October 2022)
	Prime Minister of Lebanon	Najib Mikati

== Events ==
=== January ===
- January 4 – 1 mother and 3 children die after inhaling toxic fumes from coal that was used as a cheap substitute for heating.
- January 6 – Unknown perpetrators attacked a group of United Nation peacekeeping forces in southern Lebanon.
- January 8 – Minor protests took place in Beirut against COVID restrictions for the unvaccinated.
- January 18 – Judge Ghada Aoun freezes assets belonging to Governor of Banque du Liban, Riad Salameh, amid crisis.
- January 24 – Saad Hariri announced that he will suspend his involvement in political activities and will not run in upcoming general elections.
- January 26 – Electricity deal between Lebanon, Syria and Jordan is signed by officials.
- January 31 – Lebanon Security forces claim to have uncovered 15 alleged Israeli spy networks.

=== February ===
- February 2 – Child kidnappings in Lebanon are on the rise after the kidnapping of Ryan Kanaan with a ransom of $250,000 to free him.
- February 11 - Truck transporting gas explodes on the highway in Zouk Mikael. Damaging a nearby building and a jeep. No injuries and deaths were reported.
- February 15 – Lebanon's central bank governor's whereabouts, Riad Salemeh, are unknown after police raided his office and two homes for corruption.
- February 18 – Israel's Iron Dome fails to intercept a Hezbollah-operated military drone from Lebanon that penetrated seventy kilometers into Israeli airspace. The drone flew for forty minutes before returning to Lebanon. Israeli jets fly at very low altitude over Beirut in response to the incident.
- February 23 – The EU deploys an election observation mission in Lebanon.

=== March ===
- March 21 – The Lebanese Government charges central bank governor, Riad Salemeh, and his brother, Raja, for illicit enrichment.
- March 24 – Israel Police seize 63 weapons from Arab Israeli smugglers, uncovering the largest attempt to smuggle weapons from Lebanon to Israel.

=== April ===
- April 4 – Deputy PM Saadeh Al Shami says that Lebanon and its central bank are bankrupt.
- April 12 – An explosion at an Amal Movement scout camp in Sidon, Lebanon, kills one person and injures seven others.
- April 23 – 6 people die and around 50 people are rescued after an overloaded boat sinks in Tripoli, Lebanon.
- April 24 – Energy Minister, Walid Fayad, is confronted and jostled by protesters while leaving a bar in Achrafieh, Beirut amid crisis.
- April 25 – A rocket is fired from Lebanon into Matzuva, Israel. Israel responds by firing at targets in Lebanon.

=== May ===
- May 1 – A 3.8 magnitude earthquake is felt by the residents of Cyprus and Lebanese coasts.
- May 3 – The Iraqi Government lifts ban on beverage and agricultural products from Lebanon.
- May 6 – Lebanese diaspora voting begins in the Arab world and Iran with the exception of the United Arab Emirates.
- May 8 – Lebanese diaspora voting begins in the rest of the world.
- May 15 – Lebanese voters elect a new session to Parliament. Preliminary counts show the Iran-backed Hezbollah and its allies, who won in the previous election, losing seats while the Saudi-backed Lebanese Forces made gains.
- May 20 – Two fishermen die in Sidon while preparing dynamite sticks for fishing.
- May 31 – Nabih Berri was re-elected as speaker of the Lebanese parliament with 65 (50.78%) votes in his favor for the 7th term. Elias Bou Saab was elected as his deputy.

=== June ===
- June 3 – One soldier is killed and five injured in an army raid in Baalbek in attempt to apprehend a notorious drug lord.
- June 16 – Two Hezbollah members sentenced to life imprisonment by the Special Tribunal for Lebanon for their role in the 2005 assassination of former Prime Minister Rafic Hariri.
- June 21 – Lebanon security forces raid central bank governor, Riad Salemeh's, home to create subpoena.
- June 23 – Najib Mikati is re-elected as prime minister-designate.
- June 30 – Bnoss Jounieh festival begins until July 31.

=== July ===
- July 2 – Foreign ministers of Arab countries visit Lebanon during crisis.
- July 4 – People in Bnoss Jounieh festival welcome the Lebanese national basketball team to celebrate after beating Saudi Arabia by 90–60 in World cup qualifiers and qualifying to the next round.
- July 6 – Police arrest juice seller who drugged and raped children.
- July 13 – A Saudi Arabian opposition leader is killed in Beirut; his brothers detained.
- July 24 – Miss Lebanon 2022 held in Forum de Beyrouth.
- July 31 – Part of the grain silos in the Beirut Port collapses sending plume of smoke across the blast site causing people to wear face masks to avoid the smoke.
  - Bnoss Jounieh festival ends.

=== August ===
- August 4 - Lebanon marks 2 years since the Beirut explosion.
  - Another part of the grain silos collapses sending more smoke.
- A man takes several employees hostage at a bank in Beirut, Lebanon, demanding his bank savings and threatening to set himself on fire. Police officers, soldiers, and intelligence agents surround the building.
- August 19 – Wildfires burn in a pine forest in Baskinta at around midnight local time and continues burning overnight until the next day afternoon.
- August 20 – Army and civil defense rush to the burning pine forest in Baskinta to fight off the blaze. Smoke rises all over the village. Fire spreads to 150 meters square. Helicopters fights the fire by dumping water buckets. Many trees were affected.
  - As of afternoon, the fire was being extinguished. The fire was later extinguished. No one was killed or injured.
  - People evacuated from Beirut due to the threat of the northern part of the grain silos collapsing. The fire brigade was also evacuated from the port. All employees were evacuated from the silos area.
- August 21 – Fires in Baskinta re-ignite.
- August 22 – Small part of the grain silos collapse in the morning while on fire.
- August 23 – Remaining 8 silos of the northern block of the silos collapse sending a big cloud of smoke.
- August 25 – Large fire breaks out in a generator in a beach resort in Batroun.
- August 27 – Lebanese singer, Georges Al Rassi dies in a car crash on the Masnaa Border crossing.

=== September ===
- September 16 – Lebanese banks declare 3-day closures amid security concerns over protesters demand the release of bank heist detainees.
- September 22 – 2022 Tartus migrant shipwreck: At least 94 people are killed when a boat carrying migrants from Lebanon capsizes off Syria's coast. 9 people survived. Many were declared missing and some were found either dead or injured. Dead bodies were sent to nearby hospitals. 40 people are still missing as of 24 September.

=== October ===
- October 6 – A cholera case is recorded for the first time since 1993; likely caused from an outbreak in neighboring Syria.
- October 9 – The Deir Ammar and Zahrani power stations shut down in Lebanon after running out of diesel fuel, leaving the entire country without electricity. According to a government official, power is not expected to be restored for several days.
- October 11 – Israel and Lebanon agrees to a US-brokered agreement that will allow both countries to exploit gas fields in the eastern Mediterranean Sea, ending decades of maritime border disputes between the two nations.
- October 13 – A Cessna 172 with two pilots crashes near Halat, Lebanon, during a training exercise.
- October 14 – Six people are killed and 32 more are injured during a shooting at a protest in Beirut, against the judge investigating the 2020 port explosion. Hezbollah and Amal accused the attackers of being members of the Christian Lebanese Forces. Clashes occurred for hours afterwards between the militias involving snipers, pistols, Kalashnikov rifles and rocket-propelled grenades even after the army was deployed.
- October 27 – Saudi Arabia summons the Lebanese ambassador over "offensive" remarks about the war in Yemen made by Lebanese information minister George Kurdahi.
- October 29 – Saudi Arabia recalls its ambassador to Lebanon and demands for Lebanon to reciprocate the action over "insulting" remarks about the war in Yemen made by Lebanese information minister George Kurdahi.
- October 30 – The Emirati foreign ministry announces that it will recall its diplomats in Lebanon and ban Emirati citizens from traveling to the country "in solidarity with" Saudi Arabia, which recalled its ambassador to Lebanon over "insulting" remarks about the war in Yemen made by Lebanese information minister George Kurdahi.
- October 31 - 2023– Parliament elects a new president of the republic at the end of Michel Aoun's 6-year tenure.

=== December ===
- December 12 – Three Hamas members are killed and six more injured during a dispute with Fatah gunmen in Tyre, Lebanon, at the funeral of a Hamas member killed two days ago during an accidental explosion at the Burj el-Shemali camp.

== Deaths ==
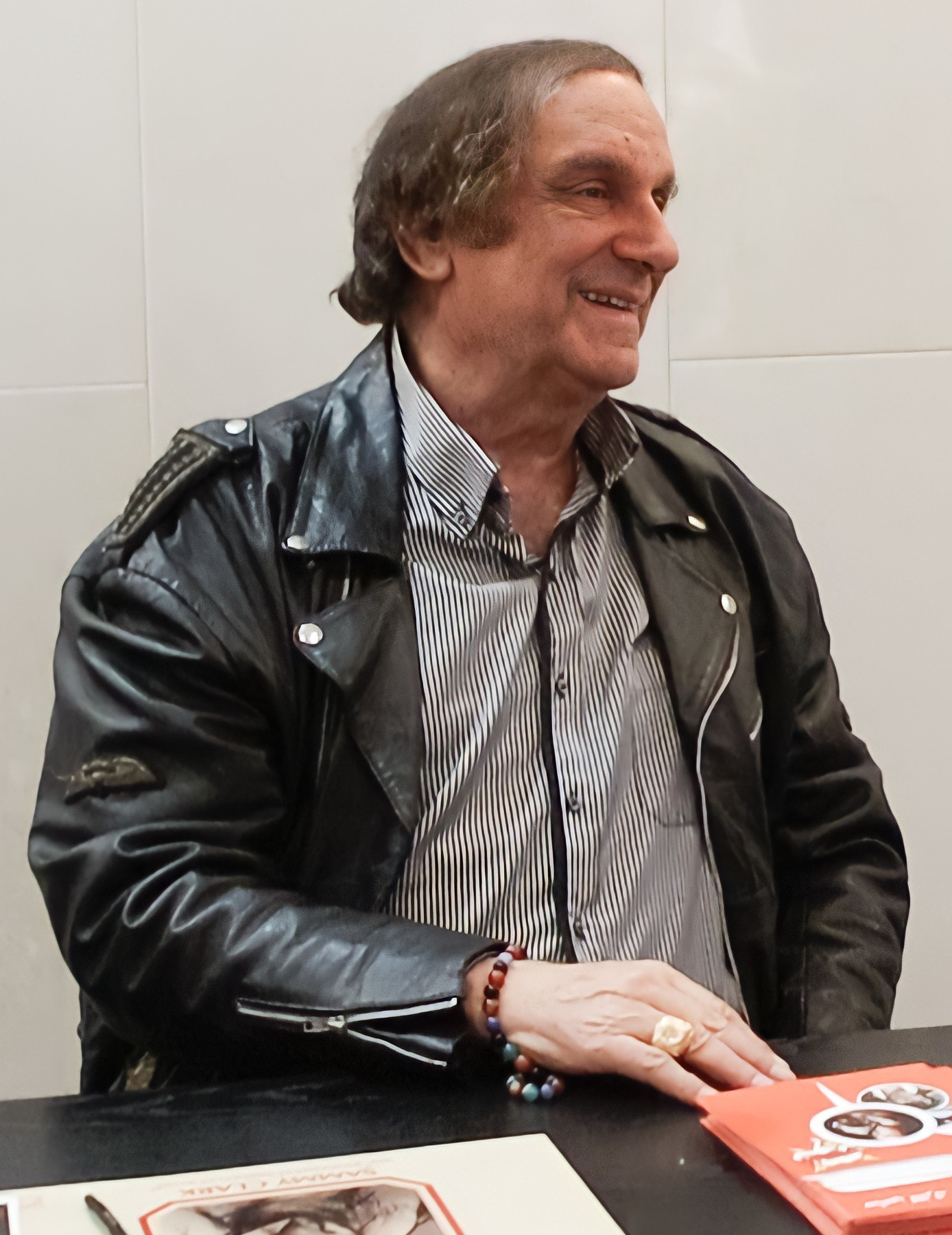
Sami Clark

- February 3 – Joseph Hitti, Maronite Catholic eparch (born 1925)
- February 20 – Sami Clark, singer (born 1948)
- March 6 – Hubert Fattal, businessperson (born 1970)
- August 27 – Georges Al Rassi, singer and actor (born 1980)
- September 11 – Muhammad Ali Chamseddine, writer and poet (born 1942)
- September 20 – Tanios El Khoury, Maronite Catholic prelate, eparch of Sidon (1996–2005) (born 1930)
- September 21 – Paul-Emile Saadé, Maronite Catholic prelate, auxiliary bishop of Antioch (1986–1999) and eparch of Batroun (1999–2011) (born 1933)
- October 2 – Camille Ziade, 79, politician, MP (1992–2000) (born 1943)
- October 7 – Paul-Mounged El-Hachem. Maronite Catholic prelate, eparch of Baalbek-Deir El Ahmar (1995–2005) (born 1934)
- November 22 – Romeo Lahoud, theatre director and composer (born 1931)
