= 2017 in Lebanon =

- Decades: 1990s; 2000s; 2010s; 2020s
- See also: History of Lebanon; Timeline of Lebanese history; List of years in Lebanon

The following lists events in the year 2017 in Lebanon.

== Incumbents ==
- President: Michel Aoun
- Prime Minister: Saad Hariri

== Events ==
=== June ===
- 30 June - Five suicide bombers attack members of the Lebanese military in two refugee camps in the town of Arsal near the Syrian border.

=== August ===
- 19 August - The Lebanese military clashes with ISIS militants and recaptures 30km from them across the border with Syria with 20 militants killed and 10 Lebanese soldiers wounded on the first day of the operation known as Fajr al-Joroud.
- 21 August - A ceasefire calms clashes between militants and Fatah in the Palestinian refugee camp of Ain al-Hilweh.
- 22 August - Clashes renew between Fatah and militants wounding 3 Palestinians in Ain al-Hilweh.

=== November ===
- 4 November - Saudi Arabia claims Lebanon declared war despite objections from the Lebanese government. Prime Minister al-Hariri resigns fearing an assassination plot.
- 10 November - 2017 Lebanon–Saudi Arabia dispute
  - Saudi Arabia, Kuwait and the United Arab Emirates urge all their citizens currently in Lebanon to leave immediately.
  - French President Emmanuel Macron makes a surprise visit to Saudi Arabia to discuss the crisis as a close partner of Lebanon.
  - Hezbollah declares the resignation of al-Hariri invalid and accuses the Saudi government of pressuring him to do so.
- 18 November - Prime Minister al-Hariri visits France to meet President Macron to discuss the crisis with Saudi Arabia.
- 22 November - Prime Minister al-Hariri visits the capital of Beirut for the first time since the crisis with Saudi Arabia began. As per President Aaoun’s request, he also suspends his resignation.

=== December ===
- 6 December - The Lebanese cautiously welcome an accord to enable al-Hariri to suspend his resignation.

== Deaths ==
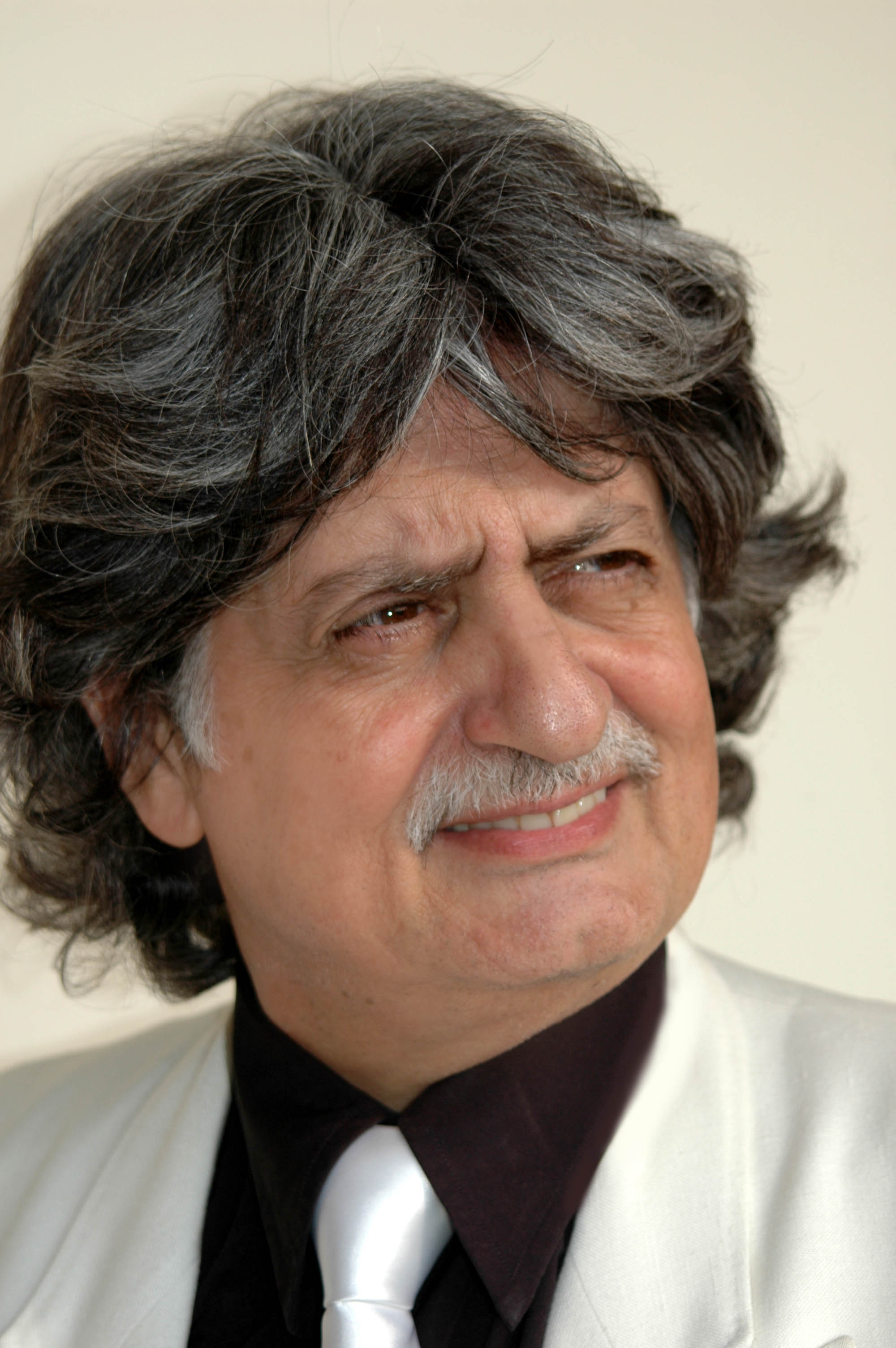
Stavro Jabra

- January – Saloua Raouda Choucair, painter and sculptor (born 1916)
- 12 March – Stavro Jabra, cartoonist (born 1947)
- 11 April – Samir Frangieh, politician and journalist (born 1945)
