= 2020 in Lebanon =

- Decades: 2000s; 2010s; 2020s
- See also: Other events of 2020; Timeline of Lebanese history

Events in the year 2020 in Lebanon.

== Incumbents ==
- President: Michel Aoun
- Prime Minister: Saad Hariri (until 21 January), Hassan Diab (from 21 January)

== Events ==
=== January ===
- January 14 – 2019-20 Lebanese Protests resume after weeks of calm.
- January 21 – A new cabinet is formed after months without one.

=== February ===
- February 21 – The 1st case of COVID-19 in Lebanon is confirmed in Beirut.
- February 28 – Lebanon bans all travel by non-residents by air, sea or land from countries worst hit by the COVID-19 outbreak. The Public Works Ministry named China, South Korea, Iran, and Italy as affected countries.

=== March ===
- March 10 – The first COVID-19 death is recorded.

=== April ===
- April 21 – Baakline attack - nine people were killed with a knife and gun in Baakline.

=== July ===
- July 27 – There was an exchange of fire between Israeli soldiers and four Hezbollah members.

=== August ===
- August 4 – 2020 Beirut explosions - An explosion in the Port of Beirut kills 203 people.
- August 5 – The government declares a two-week state of emergency following the explosions.
- August 9 – Protesters in Lebanon called on the government to end the neglect that caused the 4 August explosion.
- August 10 – Prime Minister Hassan Diab announced that he and his entire cabinet had resigned following anger over the Beirut explosions.
- August 27 – Two people were killed and at least ten wounded in clashes between Hezbollah and tribal members in Khalde.

=== September ===
- September 10 – Huge fire in the Port of Beirut sends a black plume of smoke into the air covering Beirut's sky.

=== October ===
- October 9 – a fuel tanker exploded, leaving at least four people dead and thirty injured. The blast occurred after the tank caught fire in Tariq-al-Jdide district.
- October 14 – A delegation led by Brigadier General Bassam Yassine launched talks facilitated by the United Nations and the United States with Israel over the disputed maritime border.

=== November ===
- November 21 – 2020 Baabda prison escape - 69 inmates escaped from a prison in Baabda.

=== December ===
- December 2 – At the International Conference in Support of the Lebanese People, the United Nations, World Bank, and European Union launch their Reform, Recovery and Reconstruction Framework. The 3RF focuses around rebuilding Beirut and delivering essential reforms that address the root causes of the crisis.
- December 11 – The UN-backed Special Tribunal for Lebanon (STL) sentenced Hezbollah militant Salim Jamil Ayyash to five concurrent life sentences. However, Ayyash still remains at large.

== Deaths ==
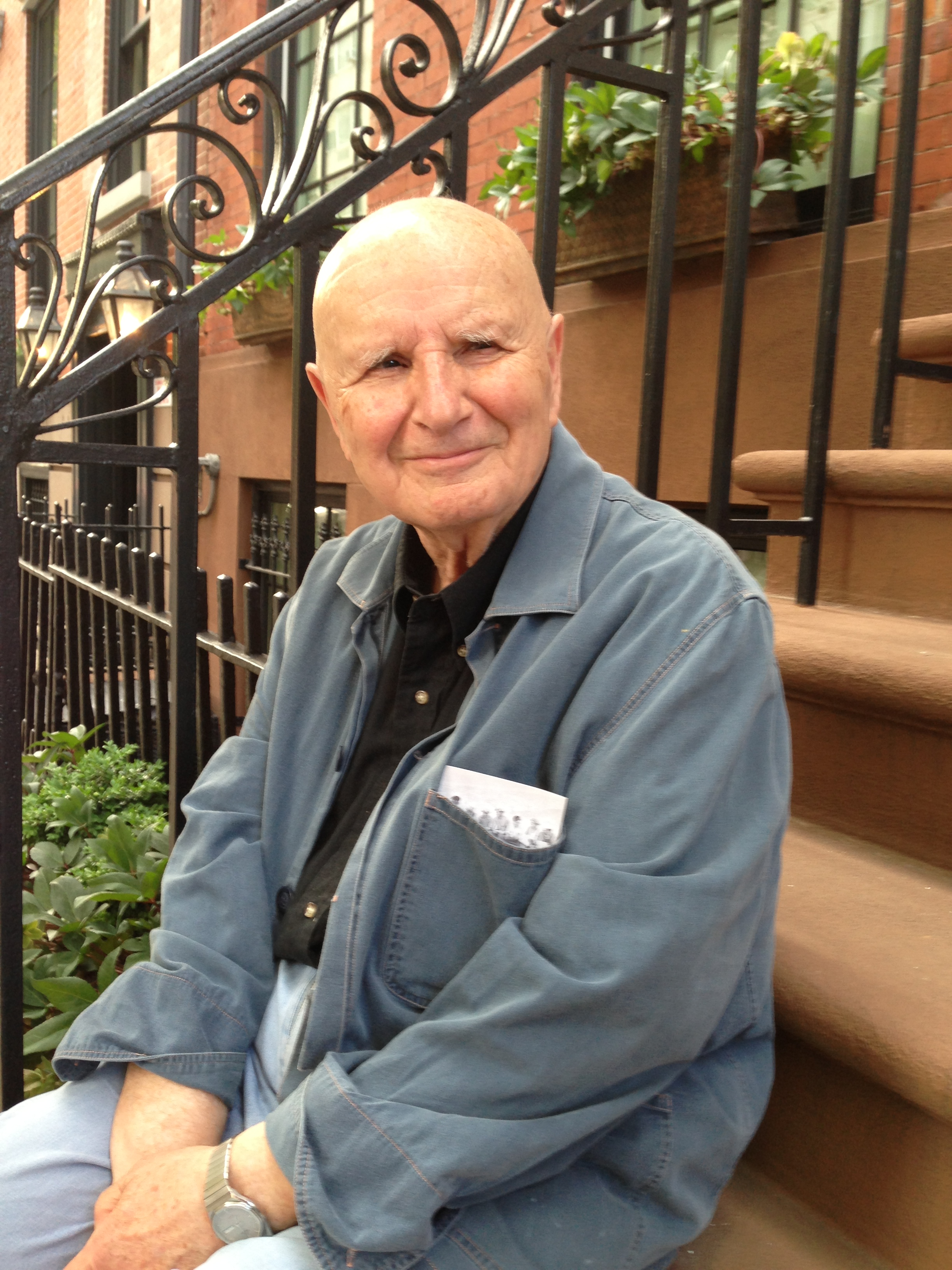
Salah Stétié

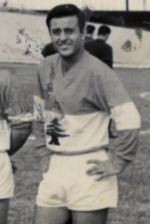
Levon Altounian

- 2 January – Najwa Qassem, journalist and television presenter (born 1967).
- 4 April – Mohammad Ali Younes, spy, head of Hezbollah's counter espionage unit.
- 19 May – Salah Stétié, writer and poet (born 1929).
- 3 June – Mohsen Ibrahim, politician (born 1935).
- 9 June – Joseph Mohsen Béchara, Maronite Catholic hierarch, Archbishop of Cyprus and Antelias (born 1935).
- 5 July – Ahmad Karami, politician (born 1944).
- 27 July – Khalil Taha, wrestler (born 1932).
- 31 July – Jocelyne Khoueiry, militant and activist (born 1955).
- 4 August – Nazar Najarian, politician, secretary-general of the Kataeb Party (born. 1959).
- 6 September – Levon Altounian, footballer (born 1936).
- 11 December – Assad Rizk, physician and politician (born 1931).
