= 2021 in Lebanon =

- Decades: 2000s; 2010s; 2020s
- See also: History of Lebanon; Timeline of Lebanese history; List of years in Lebanon

Events in the year 2021 in Lebanon.

== Incumbents ==
- President: Michel Aoun
- Prime Minister:
  - Hassan Diab
  - Najib Mikati

== Events ==
Ongoing – COVID-19 pandemic in Lebanon

=== January ===
- January 25 – Protests and clashes in Tripoli erupt against nationwide COVID-19 lockdown measures.

=== February ===
- February 16 – An oil spill in the Mediterranean caused hundreds of tons of tar to wash up on beaches including environmentally sensitive areas such as the Tyre Coast Nature Reserve, an important nesting site for endangered sea turtles.

=== March ===
- March 26 – The first 50,000 Sputnik V COVID-19 vaccine doses arrived in Lebanon, adding to the 224,640 Pfizer-BioNTech doses received over the previous six weeks.

=== May ===
- May 13 – Three rockets launched from the Qlaileh region towards Israel, landing in the Mediterranean Sea. This comes amidst the 2021 Israel-Palestine crisis.
- May 14 – One person killed by Israeli fire during demonstrations along the Blue Line.
- May 17 – Six rockets fired from the Rachaya Al Foukhar area towards Israel, with all falling within Lebanon. In response, 22 shells were launched by the Israeli army towards the source.
- May 18 – Four rockets fired from Siddikine towards Israel, causing no damage.

=== July ===
- July 15 – Lebanese Prime Minister Saad Hariri resigned from his position, further deepening the country's political crisis.

=== August ===
- August 1
  - Clashes reported in Khaldeh between Hezbollah supporters and a rival group killed at least 5 people.
- August 4
  - Lebanon marked one-year anniversary since the 2020 Beirut explosion which killed more than 200 people.
  - Clashes reported in Beirut following Lebanon's anniversary of the 2020 explosion. Dozens of people reportedly injured.
- August 5 – Israeli military launched air strikes in South Lebanon following rocket attacks from Hezbollah.
- August 9 – Fighting over fuel shortages across Lebanon caused the death of 3 people as Lebanon's economic crisis worsened.
- August 15 – At least 20 people killed and more than 7 injured after a fuel tanker exploded in Akkar District.

=== September ===
- September 10 – Government of Lebanon announces a new cabinet formation, with the re-appointment of former Lebanese Prime Minister Najib Mikati as the country's prime minister.

=== October ===
- October 9 – The country's two largest power stations shut down due to a fuel shortage resulting in a nationwide power cut.
- October 14 - Clashes break out in the Eastern Beirut neighborhood of Tayouneh between insurgents at the Justice Palace of Hezbollah and the Amal Movement, during a Hezbollah protest and allies against Tarek Bitar, the lead judge probing the 2020 explosion in the city's port, accused of being partisan, along unidentified gunmen allegedly associated with the Lebanese Forces, and the Lebanese Armed Forces, that resulted in the death of seven people and injury of 32 others, and the arrest of nine by the Lebanese Armed Forces, a resurgence of the 2008 May 7 conflict.

== Deaths ==
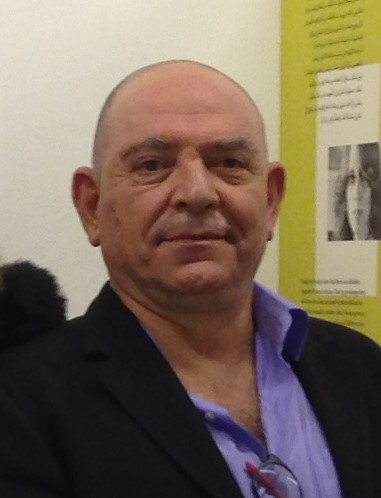
Lokman Slim

- 4 January – Elias Rahbani, lyricist and composer (b. 1938).
- 4 February – Lokman Slim, publisher and political activist (born 1962).
