= 2019 in Lebanon =

- Decades: 1990s; 2000s; 2010s; 2020s
- See also: Other events of 2019; Timeline of Lebanese history

Events in the year 2019 in Lebanon.

== Incumbents ==
- President: Michel Aoun
- Prime Minister: Saad Hariri

== Events ==
=== June ===
- June 3 - 2019 Tripoli shooting: A gunman opened fire and killed four security members in Tripoli, before he blew himself up in an apartment.

=== August ===
- August 25 - 2019 Beirut drone crash: two drones, alleged to be from Israel by Lebanese authorities, crashed in the Dahieh district of Beirut. The first drone crashed into Hezbollah's Media Center, and the second drone exploded mid-air 45 minutes later. This was the first such incident between Lebanon and Israel since the 2006 war between them.
- August 26 - 2019 Qousaya attack: A Popular Front for the Liberation of Palestine base was attacked by Israeli drones in Qousaya, Beqaa Valley, near the Syrian border

=== October ===
- October 13 - 2019 Lebanon forest fires: About 100 forest fires flared up across Lebanon overnight, and lasted until October 15. One person was killed from the fire.
- October 17 - 2019–20 Lebanese protests
- October 29 - Prime Minister Saad Hariri resigns in response to protests against the government.

=== December ===
- December 19 - Hassan Diab is named Prime Minister of Lebanon.
- December 30 - Carlos Ghosn escapes from Japan and arrives in Beirut.

== Deaths ==
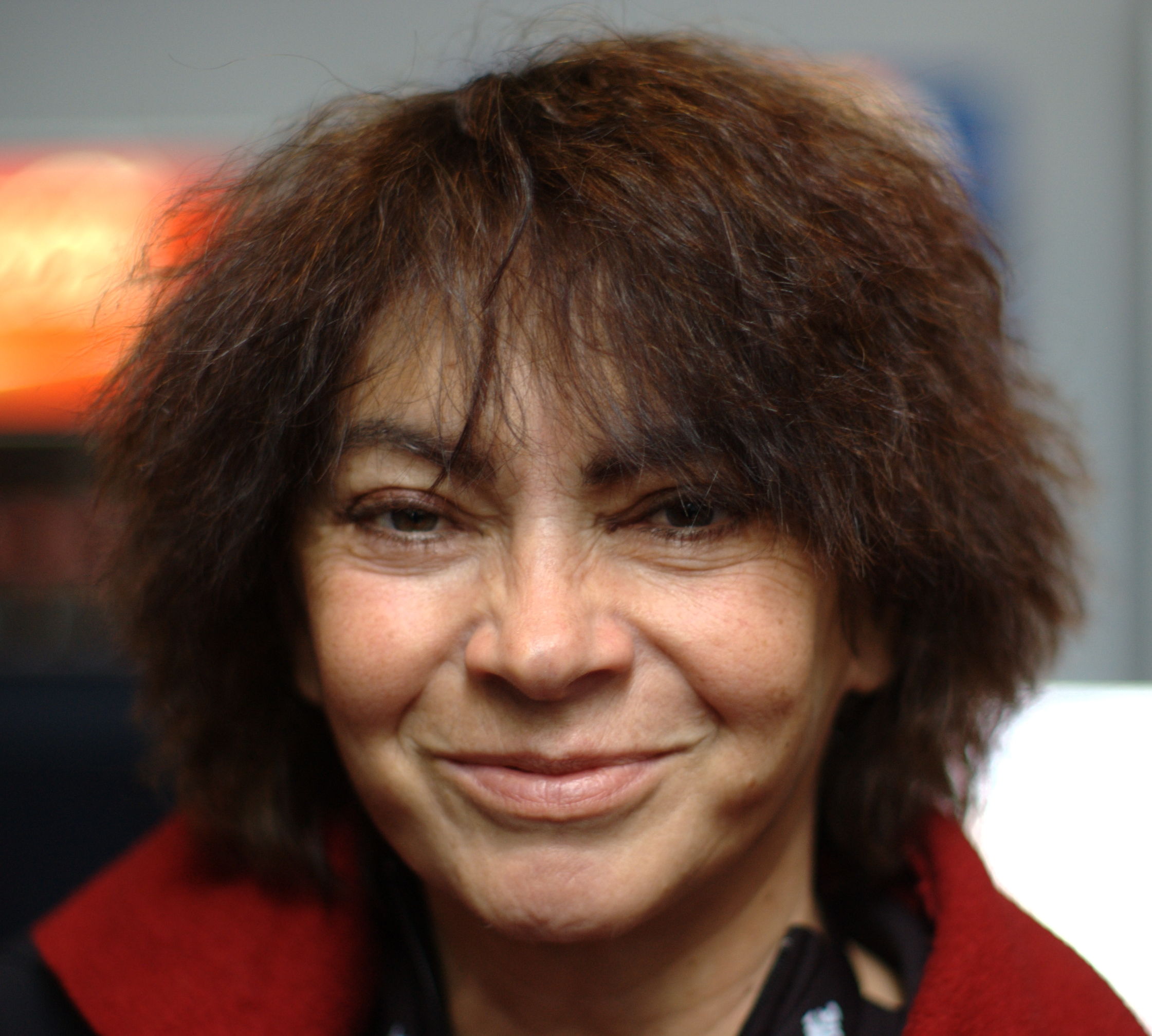
Jocelyne Saab

- 7 January – Jocelyne Saab, journalist and film director (born 1948).
- 9 January – Gebran Araiji, politician (born 1951).
- 19 January – May Menassa, writer and journalist (born 1939).
- 23 January – Georges Nasser, film director (born 1927).
- 10 February – Robert Ghanem, lawyer and politician (born 1942).
- 2 September – Georges Dib Nehme, politician (born 1932)
