= 2011 in Lebanon =

- Decades: 1990s; 2000s; 2010s; 2020s
- See also: History of Lebanon; Timeline of Lebanese history; List of years in Lebanon

The following lists events that happened in 2011 in Lebanon.

== Incumbents ==
- President: Michel Suleiman
- Prime Minister: Saad Hariri (until 13 June), Najib Mikati (starting 13 June)

== Events ==
=== January ===
- 12 January – The government collapses after Hezbollah withdraws while Prime Minister Hariri meets President of the United States Barack Obama.

=== Undated ===
- North Atlantic Restaurant is founded.
