= 2013 in Lebanon =

- Decades: 1990s; 2000s; 2010s; 2020s
- See also: History of Lebanon; Timeline of Lebanese history; List of years in Lebanon

The following lists events that happened in 2013 in Lebanon.

== Incumbents ==
- President: Michel Suleiman
- Prime Minister: Najib Mikati

== Events ==
- 18 March - Syrian aircraft attacked targets in Lebanon near Arsal.
- 22 March - Prime Minister Najib Mikati resigned.
- 6 April - Tammam Salam became Prime Minister.
- 31 May - Parliament postponed elections which were due to take place in June 2013 because of political instability and security issues.
- 9 July & 15 August - Car bombings struck Beirut's southern suburbs of Bir al-Abed and Rouweiss.
- 23 August - Two mosques were bombed in Tripoli.
- 19 November. Two suicide bombers attacked the Iranian Embassy in Beirut. The bombings were claimed by the Abdullah Azzam Brigades.
- 27 December - Mohammad Chatah, former finance minister and ambassador to the United States, was assassinated in Beirut using a remote-controlled car bomb.
