= Libnan =

Libnan is a variant of Lubnan (Arabic), Lebanon (English) or Liban (French). It may refer to:

- Ya Libnan, a Lebanese media outlet

== See also ==
- Saydet Libnan, or Our Lady of Lebanon, a Marian shrine and a pilgrimage site in Lebanon
