= 2012 in Lebanon =

- Decades: 1990s; 2000s; 2010s; 2020s
- See also: History of Lebanon; Timeline of Lebanese history; List of years in Lebanon

The following lists events that happened in 2012 in Lebanon.

== Incumbents ==
- President: Michel Suleiman
- Prime Minister: Najib Mikati

== Events ==
=== February ===
- 11 February – At least three people are killed and several wounded in Tripoli, in clashes between critics and defenders of Bashar al-Assad, the president of Syria.

=== October ===
- 3 October – Several blasts strike an arms stockpile in the Hezbollah-controlled Bekaa Valley; three Hezbollah fighters are killed.

== Deaths ==
- 1 February – Nassib Lahoud, politician (born 1944)
