= 1943 in Lebanon =

- Decades: 1920s; 1930s; 1940s; 1950s; 1960s
- See also: History of Lebanon; Timeline of Lebanese history; List of years in Lebanon

The following lists events that happened during 1943 in Lebanon.

== Incumbents ==
- President: Émile Eddé (starting 11 November and ending 22 November), Bechara El Khoury (starting 22 November)
- Prime Minister: Riad Solh (starting 25 September)

== Events ==
=== August ===
- August 29 - 1943 Lebanese general election
