= Timeline of Beirut =

Coordinates: 33°53′13″N 35°30′47″E

The following is a timeline of the history of the city of Beirut, Lebanon.

== Prior to 20th century ==
- 140 BC – City destroyed by Diodotus Tryphon.
- 64 BC – Beirut conquered by Agrippa.
- 14 BC – During the reign of Herod the Great, Berytus became a colonia.
- 551 CE – Earthquake.
- 635 – Beirut passes into Arab control.
- 759 – Prince Arslan bin al-Mundhir founds the Principality of Sin-el-Fil in Beirut.
- 1110 – Baldwin overtakes city, is absorbed into the Kingdom of Jerusalem.
- 1187 – Saladin re-takes city.
- early 17th.C. – Fakhr al-Din II fortifies the town.
- 1763 – Ottomans reclaim the city.
- 1772 – Russian occupations of Beirut.
- 1832 – Ibrahim Pasha of Egypt in power.
- 1840
  - October: Battle of Beirut.
  - Settlement of the hills surrounding the walled city begins, notably Moussaitbeh and Achrafieh
- 1853 – Grand Serail built.
- 1858 – Hadiqat al-Akhbar newspaper begins publication.
- 1860
  - Druze–Maronite conflict.
  - Sursock House built.
- 1866 – Syrian Protestant College established.
- 1868 – Archaeological Museum of the American University of Beirut established.
- 1875
  - Saint Joseph University founded.
  - Thamarāt al Funūn newspaper begins publication.
- 1877 – Lisan al-Hal newspaper begins publication.
- 1883 – Hôtel-Dieu de France founded.
- 1888 – Beirut was made capital of a vilayet (governorate) in Syria,[37] including the sanjaks (prefectures) Latakia, Tripoli, Beirut, Acre and Bekaa.
- 1894
  - Saint George Maronite Cathedral constructed.
  - Harbour, constructed by a French company.
- 1895 – Railway completed "across the Lebanon to Damascus."
- 1898 – Population: 120,000 (approximate).

== 20th century ==
=== 1900s–1960s ===
- 1999 al-Iqbāl newspaper begins publication.
- 1907
  - Railway to Aleppo completed.
  - René Moawad Garden established.
  - Baidaphon (record label) in business (approximate date).
- 1916 – Place des Canons renamed Martyrs' Square.
- 1920 – Beirut Stock Exchange founded.
- 1920 – 1 September: Lebanon Republic (Greater Lebanon) proclaimed a state.
- 1921 – Beirut Traders Association founded.
- 1924 – Al Joumhouria newspaper begins publication
- 1925
  - National Conservatory of Music established.
  - Maghen Abraham Synagogue built.
- 1927 – American Junior College for Women opens in Ras Beirut.
- 1933
  - Parliament of Lebanon building erected.
  - An-Nahar newspaper begins publication.
  - L'Orient newspaper begins publication.
- 1934 – Population: 162,000 (approximate).
- 1936 – Kamel Abbas Hamieh takes office as Governor of Beirut.
- 1937
  - Académie libanaise des beaux-arts founded.
  - Ararad newspaper begins publication.
  - Zartonk newspaper begins publication.
- 1938 – Al Akhbar newspaper begins publication.
- 1941 – Eastern Times newspaper begins publication.
- 1942 – National Museum of Beirut opens.
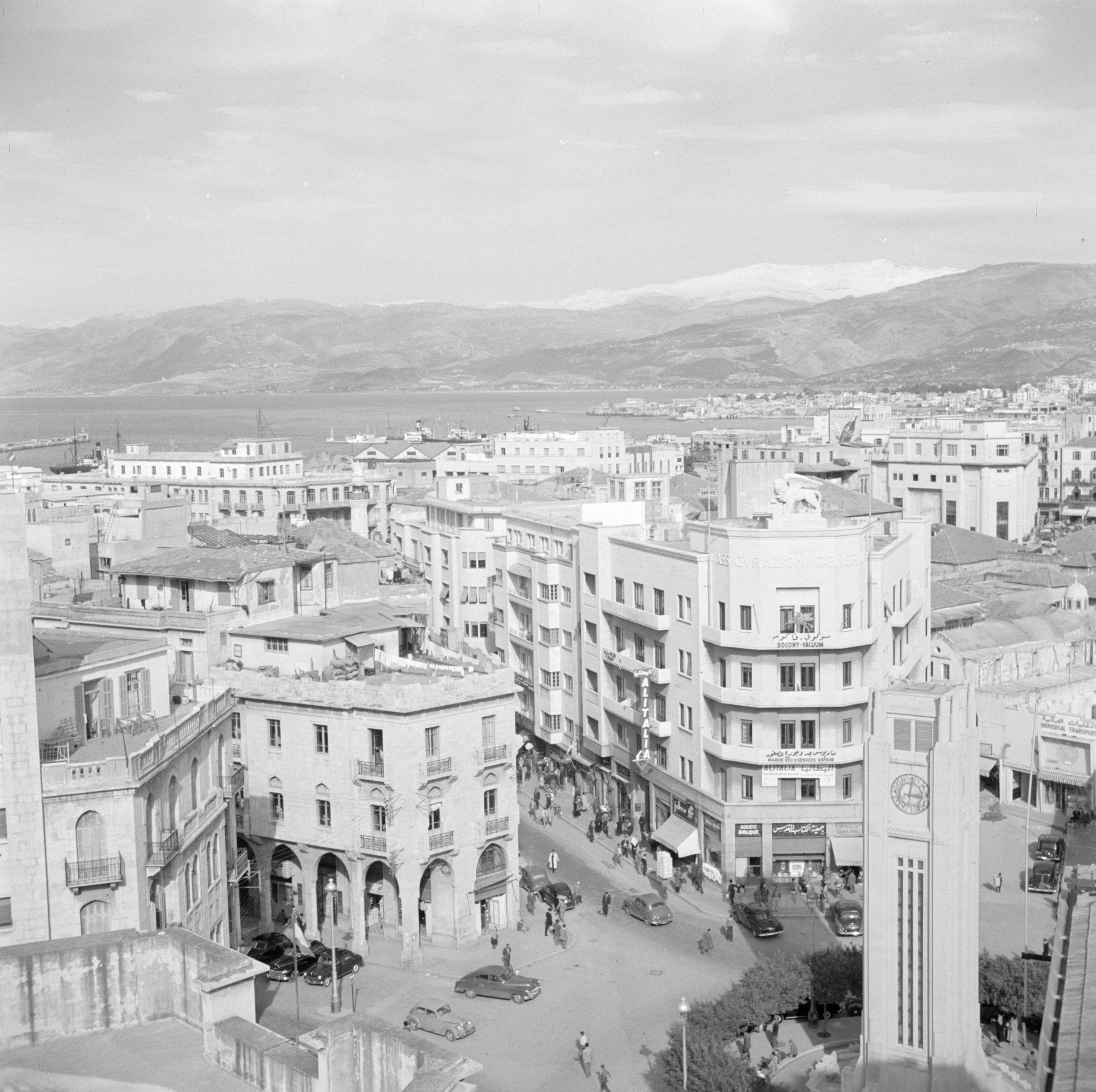
  View of Beirut in 1950
- 1943 – Beirut becomes capital city of independent Lebanon.
- 1946
  - Nicolas Rizk takes office as Governor of Beirut.
  - Al-Hayat newspaper begins publication.
- 1950 – Population: 181,271.
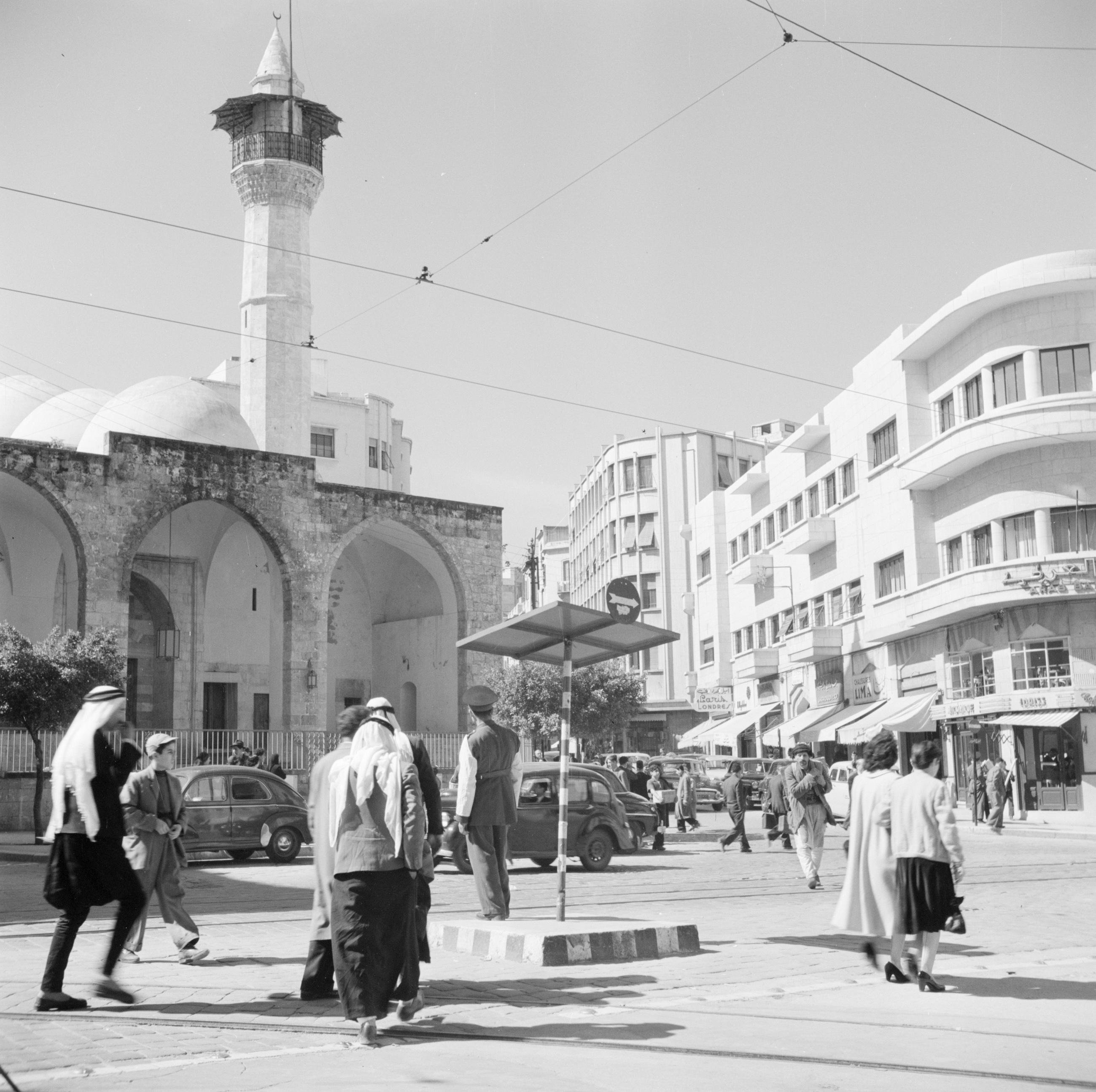
  Beirut in 1950
- 1951 – Lebanese University and Lycée Franco-Libanais Verdun founded.
- 1952
  - George Assi takes office as Governor of Beirut.
  - The Daily Star newspaper begins publication.
- 1954 – Beirut Rafic Hariri International Airport opens.
- 1956 – Bachour Haddad takes office as Governor of Beirut.
- 1957 – Camille Chamoun Sports City Stadium opens.
- 1958 – Population: 400,000 (estimate).
- 1959
  - Télé Liban (television) begins broadcasting.
  - Philip Boulos takes office as Governor of Beirut.
  - Al Anwar newspaper begins publication.
- 1960
  - Beirut Arab University established.
  - Emile Yanni takes office as Governor of Beirut.
- 1961
  - Orient-Institut Beirut established.
  - Sursock Museum and Phoenicia Beirut Hotel open.
- 1963 – Gallery One (cultural space) opens.
- 1964 – Saint Nicolas Garden opens.
- 1966 – Al Ahed football team established, headquartered in Beirut.
- 1967 – Chafik Abou Haydar takes office as Governor of Beirut.
- 1968 – "Israel raids Beirut airport."

=== 1970s–1990s ===
- 1970
  - L'Orient Le Jour newspaper begins publication.
  - Population: 474,870 city; 938,940 urban agglomeration.
  - Sassine Square construction ends
- 1972 – Manoukian Center established.
- 1973 – Holiday Inn in business.
- 1974 – As-Safir newspaper begins publication.
- 1975
  - April: Lebanese Civil War begins.
  - Green Line established between mainly Muslim factions in West Beirut and the Christian Lebanese Front in East Beirut.
  - Centre for Arab Unity Studies founded.
- 1976 – al-Murābiṭ newspaper begins publication.
- 1977 – Mitri El Nammar takes office as Governor of Beirut.
- 1978 – Syrian siege of Achrafiyeh, the main Christian district of Beirut.
- 1982
  - Israeli invasion.
  - 14 September: Bachir Gemayel assassinated.
- 1983 – French and US barracks bombed.
- 1986 – Centre de Documentation et de Recherches Arabes Chretiennes founded.
- 1987 – George Smaha takes office as Governor of Beirut.
- 1988 – Ad-Diyar newspaper begins publication.
- 1989 – Lebanese Center for Policy Studies headquartered in city.
- 1990 – Center for Strategic Studies Research and Documentation
- 1991 – Al Manar TV begins broadcasting.
- 1992 – Nayef Al Maaloof takes office as Governor of Beirut
- 1993
  - B 018 nightclub opens.
  - Future Television begins broadcasting.
- 1994 – Solidere (redevelopment company) founded.
- 1995 – Nicolas Saba takes office as Governor of Beirut
- 1997
  - Arab Image Foundation established.
  - Camille Chamoun Sports City Stadium rebuilt.
- 1999
  - Yaacoub Sarraf takes office as Governor of Beirut.
  - Planet Discovery children's museum inaugurated.
  - Lebanese National Symphony Orchestra and Al-Kafaàt University founded.
- 2000 – Museum of Lebanese Prehistory established.

== 21st century ==
=== 2000s ===
- 2001 – Beirut International Exhibition & Leisure Center opens.
- 2003
  - Beirut Marathon begins.
  - Music Hall opens.
  - Al-Balad newspaper begins publication.
- 2004
  - Souk el Tayeb farmer's market opens.
  - Helem (LGBT group) active.
  - Al-Saha Village restaurant in business.
- 2005
  - Cedar Revolution
  - Nassif Kaloosh takes office as Governor of Beirut
  - Ya Libnan news website launched.
- 2006
  - Political protests
  - Robert Mouawad Private Museum opens.
  - Sister city relationship established with Los Angeles, USA.
- 2007 – Mohammad Al-Amin Mosque built.
- 2008 – Platinum Tower built.
- 2009
  - 2009 Jeux de la Francophonie held in Beirut.
  - Beirut Art Center opens.
  - Beirut Souks and Le Gray hotel in business.
  - City named World Book Capital by UNESCO.

=== 2010s ===
- 2010
  - Bilal Hamad becomes mayor.
  - Four Seasons Hotel Beirut opens.
- 2011
  - Political protests
  - Zaitunay Bay pedestrian area opens.
- 2012
  - Violent unrest related to Syrian uprising.
  - Al-Mayadeen television begins broadcasting.
  - 19 October: Bombing in Achrafieh.
  - 16 November: Überhaus nightclub opens.
- 2013
  - 9 July: Bombing in Bir el-Abed.
  - 15 August: Bombing.
  - 19 November: Iranian embassy bombings.
  - 27 December: Bombing.
- 2015
  - 21 July: Protests.
  - 12 November: Bombing.

=== 2020s ===
- 2020
  - 4 August: Explosion in port
- 2021
  - 14 October: Clashes

== See also ==
- Beirut history
- List of governors of Beirut
- Timeline of Lebanese history

== Bibliography ==
Published in 19th century

- John Macgregor (1844). "Syria and Palestine: Beyrout". Commercial Statistics. London: C. Knight and Co.
- "Beyrout", Cook's Tourists' Handbook for Palestine and Syria, London: T. Cook & Son, 1876
- Èmile Isambert (1881). "Beyrout". Itinéraire descriptif, historique et archéologique de l'Orient. Guides Joanne (in French). Vol. 3: Syrie, Palestine. Hachette. hdl:2027/nyp.33433002689614.
- R. Lambert Playfair (1892), "Beyrout", Handbook to the Mediterranean (3rd ed.), London: John Murray
- "Beirut", Handbook for Travellers in Syria and Palestine (3rd ed.), Leipsig: K. Baedeker, 1898

Published in 20th century

- Wilson, Charles William; Hogarth, David George (1910). "Beirut" . Encyclopædia Britannica. Vol. 3 (11th ed.). p. 123.
- Benjamin Vincent (1910). "Beyrout". Haydn's Dictionary of Dates (25th ed.). London: Ward, Lock & Co.
- Ali Jihad Racy (1986). "Words and Music in Beirut: A Study of Attitudes". Ethnomusicology. 30 (3): 413–427. doi:10.2307/851587. JSTOR 851587.
- Mona Takieddin Amyuni (1987). "The Image of the City: Wounded Beirut". Alif: Journal of Comparative Poetics (7). JSTOR 521854. – literary criticism
- Dona J. Stewart (1996). "Economic Recovery and Reconstruction in Postwar Beirut". Geographical Review. 86 (4): 487–504. Bibcode:1996GeoRv..86..487S. doi:10.2307/215929. JSTOR 215929.
- Saree Makdisi (1997). "Laying Claim to Beirut: Urban Narrative and Spatial Identity in the Age of Solidere". Critical Inquiry. 23 (3): 661–705. doi:10.1086/448848. JSTOR 1344040. S2CID 162322532.
- Projecting Beirut. 1998.

Published in 21st century

- Sara Scalenghe and Nadya Sbaiti (2003). "Conducting Research in Lebanon: An Overview of Historical Sources in Beirut". Middle East Studies Association Bulletin. 37. JSTOR 23063088.
- C. Edmund Bosworth, ed. (2007). "Beirut". Historic Cities of the Islamic World. Leiden: Koninklijke Brill. p. 53+. ISBN 978-9004153882.
- Lara Deeb and Mona Harb (2007). "Sanctioned Pleasures: Youth, Piety and Leisure in Beirut". Middle East Report (245): 12–19. JSTOR 25164816.
- Michael R.T. Dumper; Bruce E. Stanley, eds. (2008), "Beirut", Cities of the Middle East and North Africa, Santa Barbara, USA: ABC-CLIO, p. 82+, ISBN 9781576079201
- Joe Nasr; Eric Verdeil (2008). "Reconstructions of Beirut". City in the Islamic World. Leiden: Koninklijke Brill. p. 1115+. ISBN 978-9004171688 – via HAL, Centre pour la communication scientifique directe, France.
- Sarah Rogers (2008). "Producing the Local: The Visual Arts in Beirut". Middle East Studies Association Bulletin. 42 (1/2): 19–25. JSTOR 23063538.
- Gerhard Böwering, ed. (2013). "Beirut". Princeton Encyclopedia of Islamic Political Thought. Princeton University Press. p. 67. ISBN 978-0-691-13484-0.
- Lara Deeb; Mona Harb (2013). Leisurely Islam: Negotiating Geography and Morality in Shi'ite South Beirut. Princeton University Press. ISBN 978-1-4008-4856-0.
- Beirut City Profile, United Nations Human Settlements Programme, 2021
