= 2014 in Lebanon =

- Decades: 1990s; 2000s; 2010s; 2020s
- See also: Other events of 2014; Timeline of Lebanese history

The following lists some remarkable events that happened in 2014 in Lebanon on a monthly basis.

== Incumbents ==
- President: Michel Suleiman (until 25 May), Tammam Salam (acting) (starting 25 May)
- Prime Minister: Najib Mikati (until 15 February), Tammam Salam (starting 15 February)

== Events ==
=== January ===
- January 1 - Sources confirm that Lebanon has captured Majid bin Mohammad al-Majid, leader of the al-Qaeda-linked group Abdullah Azzam Brigades responsible for the recent bombing of the Iranian embassy in Beirut.
- January 2 - Five people are killed and 20 wounded in a car bomb that hit a southern suburb of Beirut.
- January 4 - Majid al-Majid, the chief of the Abdullah Azzam Brigades militant group that was accused of being responsible for a double suicide bombing in front of the Iranian embassy in Beirut, in November 2013, dies in custody in a military hospital in Beirut.
- January 5 - A sniper kills a man and six people are wounded in clashes between districts in Tripoli that support rival sides in neighboring Syria's civil war.
- January 16 - A suicide bomber kills 4 people and injures 26 in Hermel, a Hezbollah stronghold near the Syrian border.
- January 17 - A rocket fired from Syria into the Lebanese border town of Arsal kills seven people and wounds 15.
- January 21 - A bomb detonates at a Hezbollah building in Beirut, killing 4 people and wounding 35.

=== February ===
- February 12 - The Syrian Army and their Lebanese ally Hezbollah begin an assault to retake the strategic border town Yabrud from the Syrian rebels.
- February 15 - A new government is formed in Lebanon after 10 months of gridlock, Tammam Salam is elected to be prime minister.
- February 16 - Hezbollah leader, Hassan Nasrallah, calls on other sectarian forces in the Arab world to withdraw from Syria, saying that if they did so, Hezbollah would also "not remain in Syria either."
- February 19 - Two people are killed and 38 injured in a bombing of a Hezbollah stronghold in Beirut.
- February 24 - Israeli Air Force planes reportedly bomb a weapons shipment of SS-21 missiles destined for Hezbollah near a Hezbollah stronghold on the Lebanon-Syria border.
- February 26 - Syrian army and Hezbollah troops kill over 70 rebel fighters in an ambush in the outskirts of Damascus.
- February 28 - Syrian air strikes near the Lebanese border town of Arsal killed three people.

=== March ===
- March 21 - Clashes erupt in Tripoli, between Syrian government supporters and detractors, leaving 3 dead.
- March 29 - A suicide bomber kills three soldiers at a Lebanese army checkpoint in the border town of Arsal close to the Syrian border.

=== April ===
- April 14 - Syrian government troops recapture the towns of Al-Sarkha and Ma'loula near the Syria-Lebanon border.

=== May ===
- May 25 - Lebanese security forces arrest Islamist militant leader Omar Bakri Muhammad.

=== June ===
- June 24 - A car bombing occurs in a Shiite suburb of Beirut killing the bomber and injuring five other people.

=== July ===
- July 18 - 2014 Qalamoun offensive: More than 100 people are killed as Hezbollah clashes with Syrian rebels on the border between Lebanon and Syria.

=== August ===
- August 4 - Battle of Arsal: 14 soldiers have been killed and 22 are missing after clashes with the Islamic State of Iraq and the Levant fighters on the Syrian border. At least 50 militants and 50 civilians have also died.
- August 6 - Saudi Arabia grants Lebanon US$1 billion to help the country in its conflict with self-declared jihadist fighters on the border with Syria.
- August 13 - An interview with Fatah militants in the Gaza Strip was aired on Lebanon TV in which they claim to be planning a "high profile" attack and claim to be moving rockets in order to be fired into Israel.
- August 27 - Syrian rebels take over the border Quneitra crossing between Israel and Syria after heavy fighting. Mortar rounds and rockets were launched into Israel. One IDF soldier is wounded by a bullet just days after rocket attacks from Lebanon.

=== September ===
- September 19 - 2 Lebanese soldiers were killed and 3 wounded when a bomb exploded as their convoy was headed towards Arsal.

=== October ===
- October 9 - The Lebanon presidential elections are aborted for the 13th round.
- October 26 - North Lebanon clashes: Fighting between the Lebanese Army and Islamist militants over 2 days in Tripoli leaves 11 soldiers, 8 civilians, and 22 militants dead.
- October 29 - The Lebanon presidential elections are aborted for the 14th round.

=== December ===
- December 2 - Unidentified gunmen kill 6 Lebanese soldiers near the eastern town of Ras Baalbek.
- December 2 - The Lebanese government arrests a wife and daughter of ISIL leader Abu Bakr al-Baghdadi.

== Deaths ==
- 1 September – Farid Raphaël, Lebanese banker (born 1933).
