= Mohammad Ali Younes =

Head of Hezbollah's counter espionage unit

Mohammad Ali Younes (died 4 April 2020) was the head of Hezbollah's counter espionage unit, and a member of the Islamic Resistance, the military wing of Hezbollah.

Younes was reportedly a close associate of Qasem Soleimani.

== Death ==
He was shot in between Qaqiyat al-Jisr and Zawtar El Gharbiyeh, near Nabatiyeh in southern Lebanon on 4 April 2020 (after first being stabbed according to Al Arabiya).

The Associated Press reported that he had at least two stab wounds and four bullet wounds.

The Lebanese state run National News Agency reported that a suspect had been arrested.

It appears is reported that the vehicle he was in was ambushed.

Hezbollah's media source and Iran's Fars News described him as a martyr.

Opposition Lebanese media blamed the Mossad for the killing.
