= 2018 in Lebanon =

- Decades: 1990s; 2000s; 2010s; 2020s
- See also: Other events of 2018; Timeline of Lebanese history

Events in the year 2018 in Lebanon.

== Incumbents ==
- President: Michel Aoun
- Prime Minister: Saad Hariri

== Events ==
- 6 May – The 2018 Lebanese general election was held; 128 members from 15 districts were elected to the Parliament.
- 30 September – The Miss Lebanon 2018 beauty pageant had 30 candidates, and was won by Maya Reaidy.

== Deaths ==
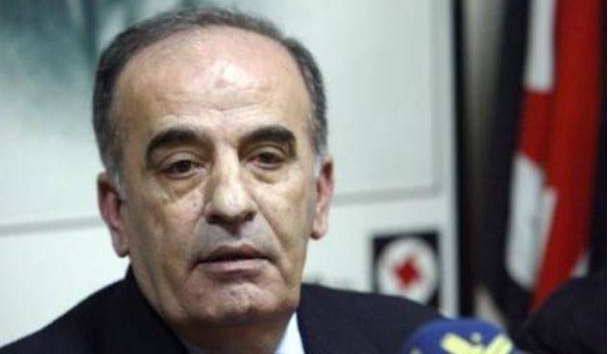
Ali Qanso

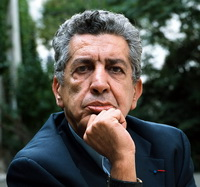
Antoine Sfeir

- 14 March – Emily Nasrallah, writer and women's rights activist (b. 1931).
- 4 July – Ali Qanso, politician (b. 1947/1948).
- 1 October – Antoine Sfeir, journalist and professor (b. 1948).
