= Habib Sadek =

Lebanese politician, poet and writer (died 2023)

Habib Sadek (Arabic: حبيب صادق; born 1930/1931 – 1 July 2023) was a Lebanese poet, writer and politician who was a member of parliament. He was the president of the Conseil Culturel Liban Sud. He was described as a Marxist.

He founded the Democratic Left Movement which brought together left-wing academics and intellectuals who which opposed the Syrian occupation and integrating into what would become the March 14 Alliance.

Sadek died on 1 July 2023, at the age of 92.
