= 2019 Lebanon forest fires =

Series of wildfires in Lebanon

Lebanon Wildfires 2019
- Date: October 13, 2019 —
- Location: Mount Lebanon regions

Statistics
- Burned area: 5,174
- Land use: Forest, Residential

Impacts
- Deaths: 1
- Injuries: 50 civilians; 5 firefighters

Ignition
- Cause: Unknown

Lebanon Wildfires 2019 is a series of 194 forest fires according to Lebanese Civil Defense, which broke out on Sunday 13 October at night, and spread over large areas of Lebanon's forests. It came on large areas of forests and residential areas in both the Chouf, Khroub and other areas to the south of Beirut, while four houses were completely burned. Residents were directed to evacuate their homes for fear of suffocation and threatening their lives. At least one civilian reportedly died in the Chouf area while volunteering to help firefighters extinguish a fire. The intensity of smoke clouds caused by the fires reached a limit covering the entrances of Beirut, Chouf and Saida.

== Possible Causes ==
According to preliminary reports, the fires started on Sunday evening, October 13, Because of high temperatures that reached 38 degrees Celsius and gusts dry winds helped spreading fires in forests and green areas. But many officials said it was too early to know the cause of the fires and that would be investigated.

According to a report by Republic of Lebanon's Ministry of the Environment, the calculated start date of the fire danger season for 2019 was 23 May, and the calculated end date was 15 November 2019.

== Fire Resistance ==
A Mu'azin in one of the Mosques of Dibbiyeh village in the Chouf district of mount Lebanon, calling both Muslims and Christians who have lost their homes in the wildfires to seek refuge inside the mosque.

The Lebanese Civil Defense confronted the fires for two days, but the lack of equipment and the large-scale expansion of fires led to its inability to resist fires. Lebanese Prime Minister Saad Al-Hariri confirmed his contact with a number of countries to send assistance via helicopters and firefighting planes, In response to these calls, Cyprus rushed to send two planes that participated with Lebanese army helicopters in the suppression operations. Jordan, Turkey and Greece also participated in firefighting. According to press reports on Tuesday (October 15), fire has decreased in different places due to rains

== Fire Fighting Participants ==
- Lebanon
  - The Lebanese civil defense elements and the army planes do great efforts to deal with the fires, but the lack of resources hindered their work.
  - Displaced Palestinians and Syrians participated in extinguishing fires, and the Palestinian Civil Defense in the camps used its crews and equipment in fire fighting.
- Cyprus
  - Cyprus sent two planes to help put out fires.
- Jordan
  - Two planes arrived from Jordan to participate in extinguishing fires.
- Turkey
  - Turkey sent planes to help put out fires.
- Greece
  - Greece sent planes to put out fires.

== International Response ==
- Israel
  - The Lebanese did not appeal to Israel for help.
- Ghana
  - Ghana informed the Ambassador of Lebanon of its readiness to send tree seedlings to reforest all forests and burned forests.
