= Salah Stétié =

Lebanese writer and poet (1929–2020)

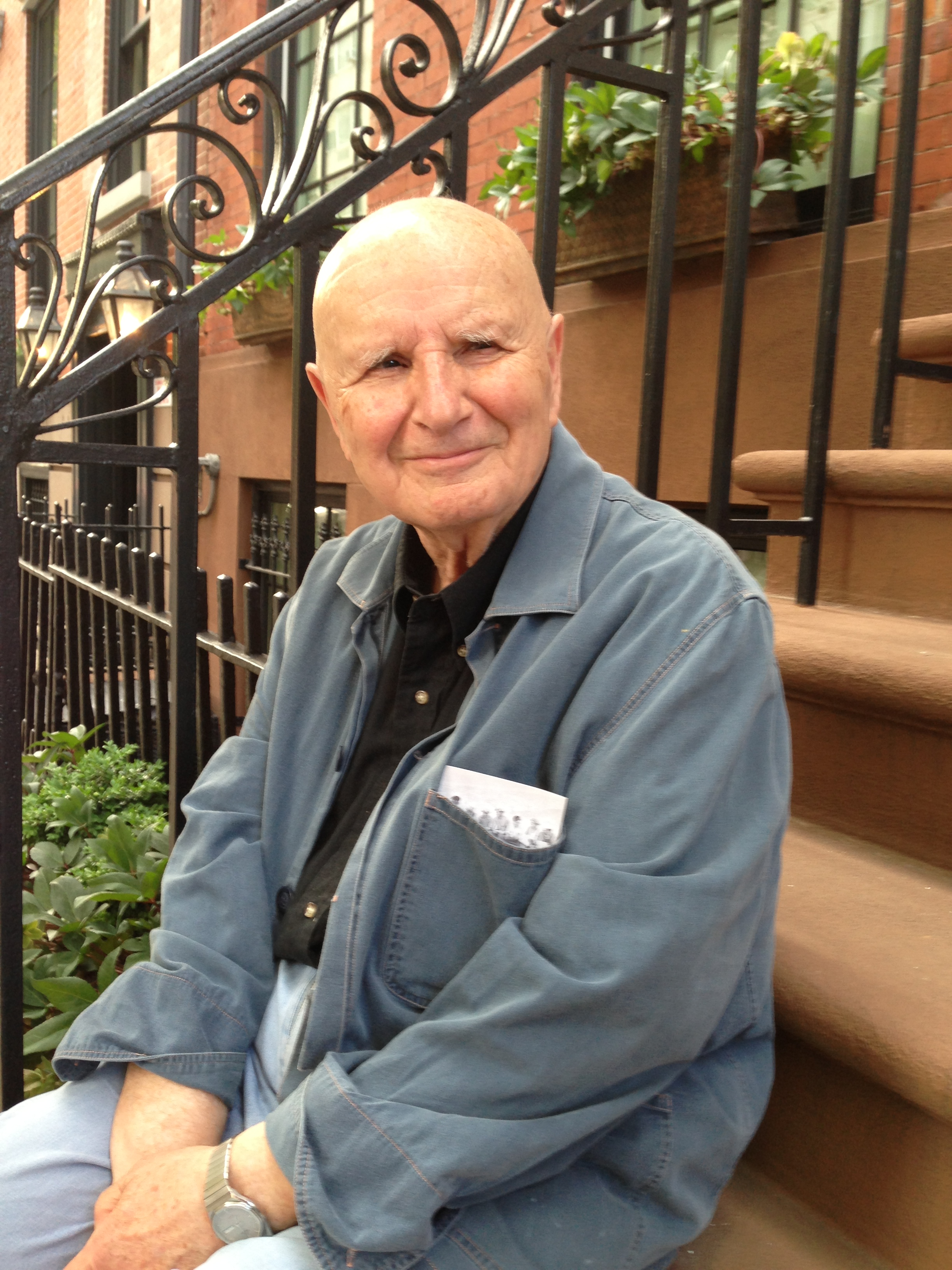

Salah Stétié (Arabic: صلاح ستيتية) (28 September 1929 – 19 May 2020) was a Lebanese writer and poet who wrote in the French language. He also served in various diplomatic positions for Lebanon in countries such as Morocco and France. Although his mother tongue was Arabic, Stetie chose to write in French.

== Biography ==
Salah Stetie was born on 28 September 1929 in Beirut, Lebanon to a bourgeois Sunni family. His father, Mahmoud Stetie, was a teacher and Arabic poet who provided his son with a solid foundation in Arabic and Muslim culture.

In his native country, he studied at the French Protestant College of Beirut, Saint Joseph University of Beirut, and the Graduate School of Arts of Beirut, where he studied Letters and Law under the tutelage of Gabriel Bounoure, whom he considered a spiritual teacher. He then studied Orientalism at the Sorbonne in 1951 under a scholarship. His time in Paris proved influential; he published the books Le Voyage D'Alep and Mercure De France, and became friends with a number of French poets including Yves Bonnefoy. Paris became one of two “mental poles” for Stetie; this is to say, he came to think of himself just as much a Francophone and Parisian as he did an Arab and Lebanese. In 1955 he returned to Lebanon where he taught at the Lebanese Academy of Beaux-Arts, Graduate School of Arts of Beirut, and the University of Beirut, where he taught until 1961 when his diplomatic career began.

In the 1960s, he served as a Lebanese Cultural Diplomat in Paris and Occidental Europe, and also as UNESCO's delegate for Lebanon. In 1982 he began a tenure as a Lebanese diplomat in the Netherlands, a position he held until 1984 when he was appointed as a diplomat in Morocco. In 1987 he was appointed Secretary General of the Department of Foreign Affairs in his home country, before returning to his diplomatic position in the Netherlands in 1991. In 1992, he retired to Le Tremblay-sur-Mauldre.

He died in Paris on May 19, 2020

== Works in English ==
- Michael Bishop, ed. (2000). Cold water shielded: selected poems. Bloodaxe. ISBN 9781852244873.
- A Key to the Lebanon. Garnet Publishing, Limited. 1999. ISBN 9781859641378.

== Works in French ==
- 1964: “La nymphe des rats”
- 1972: “La Mort Abeille”
- 1973: “L'eau Froide Gardée”
- 1973: “Fragments: Poèmes”
- 1978: “André Piyere de Mandiargues”
- 1979: “Obscure Lampe De Cela”
- 1980: “La Unième Nuit”
- 1980: “Ur En Poèsie”
- 1980: “Inversion de L'arbe et du Silence”
- 1983: “L'Etre Poupée”
- 1983: “Colombe D'Aquiline”
- 1984: “Nuage Avec des Voix”
- 1984: "Firdaws, essai sur les jardins et les contre-jardins de l'Islam"
- 1988: "Incises"
- 1991: "Le Voyage D'Alep"
- 1991: "Les sept Dormants au péril de la poésie"
- 1992: " L'épée des larmes"
- 1996: "Archer Aveugle"
- 1996: "Lecture D'Une Femme"
