= Marwan G. Najjar =

Lebanese scriptwriter, producer (1947–2023)

Marwan Najjar
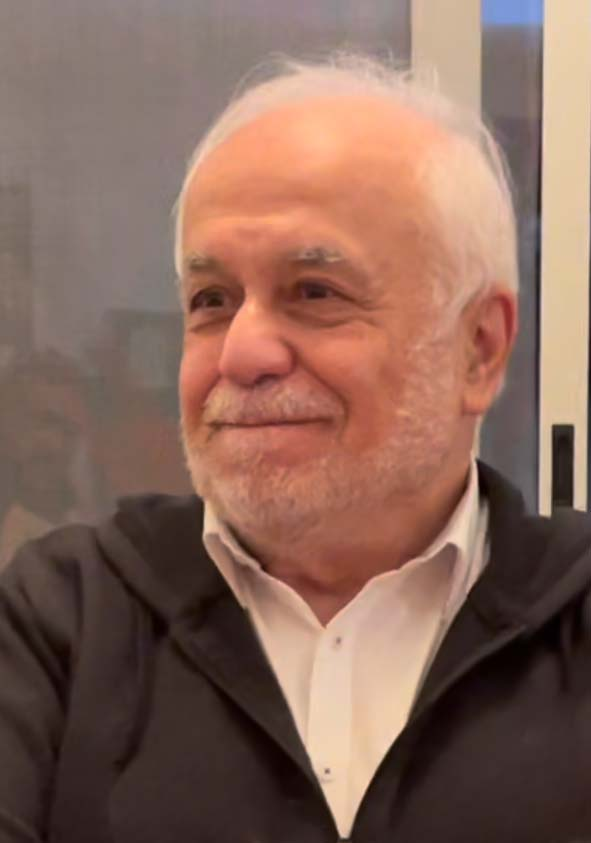
- Najjar in 2022
- Born: Marwan Georges Najjar; 2 January 1947; Beirut, Lebanon
- Died: 14 February 2023 (aged 76); Bishmezzine, Koura District, Lebanon
- Education: American University of Beirut
- Occupations: Scriptwriter; producer

Marwan Georges Najjar (Arabic: مروان جورج نجار; 2 January 1947 – 14 February 2023) was a Lebanese scriptwriter and producer.

== Early life and education ==
Najjar graduated with a degree in comparative literature and education from the American University of Beirut in 1969. Later, he completed his post-graduate studies at the same university.

== Career ==
In 1970, he collaborated with Kifah Fakhoury and created a musical show named AUB 1910 while studying at the university.

Najjar started his professional career as a cultural journalist and worked for Ousbouh el-Arabi (Arab Week) and al-Diyar magazine. Later, in 1977, he changed his career and joined television when he met television star Hind Abillamah and her husband Antoine Rémy. With their help, he transitioned his career and wrote his first series, Diala in 1978. He continued work in his new chosen career. His educational urge compelled him to work for a notable quiz show of his time, Al Moutafawikoun.

His work slowly shifted towards comedy and in 1982 he worked on the Lebanese version of Georges Feydeau's La Puce à l’Oreille (Le3ib el Far) or A Flee (sic) in Her Ear.

Consequently, he founded Marwan Najjar's Theatre Company which produced plays for twenty-three consecutive years performing more than 20 plays.

In the 1990s, he returned to television along with his ongoing career in theatre and worked on family titles such as Match-Seekers (Talbeen el Orb) and A Glimpse of Love (Lam7it hob).

In 2001 he launched his first movie Mechwar The Journey starring actor Yorgo Chalhoub, followed the next year by Fall for me A7ebini starring Viviane Antonios and Badih Abou Chakra.

In 2004, his movie Summer Breeze Nasmat Sayf was released.

== Personal life and death ==
Marwan Najjar was a brother of Souheil, Dr. Walid, and Ramsay G. Najjar.

Najjar died on 14 February 2023, at the age of 76.

== Filmography ==
Marwan Najjar has worked on the following titles:

For TV

- Diala (1978)
- Sami Maseh al ahziya - Sami the shoe shine (1978)
- Al Chafak - Twilight (1981)
- Basmat al Takhalli - The Smile of Desertion (1984)
- Istaz Mandour - Professor Mandour (1985)
- Zawj el Anissa - The Miss's Husband (1985)
- Rehlat Al Omor - The Journey of a Lifetime (1985)
- Fares Ibn Em Fares (1987)
- Harreef w Zareef - Cute and Clever (1994)
- Tijaraton aan Taradin - Consensual Trade (1995)
- Talbeen el Orb - Match-seekers (1997))
- Men aha Byout Rass Beirut - Best homes of Ras Beirut (2001)
- Bent el Hay - Neighborhood's Daughter (2001)
- Lamhet Hobb - Love Glimpse (2002)
- Myriana (2003)
- Hassad el Mawassem - Harvest Seasons (2002)
- Sarit Maeh - Happened Indeed (2004)
- Hello Adar - March's dream (2006)
- Al Taghiya - The Tyrant (2007)
- That w Nabat - Happy ever after (2009)
- Mouaabad - Sentenced for life (2009)
