= 2015 in Lebanon =

- Decades: 1990s; 2000s; 2010s; 2020s
- See also: Other events of 2015; Timeline of Lebanese history

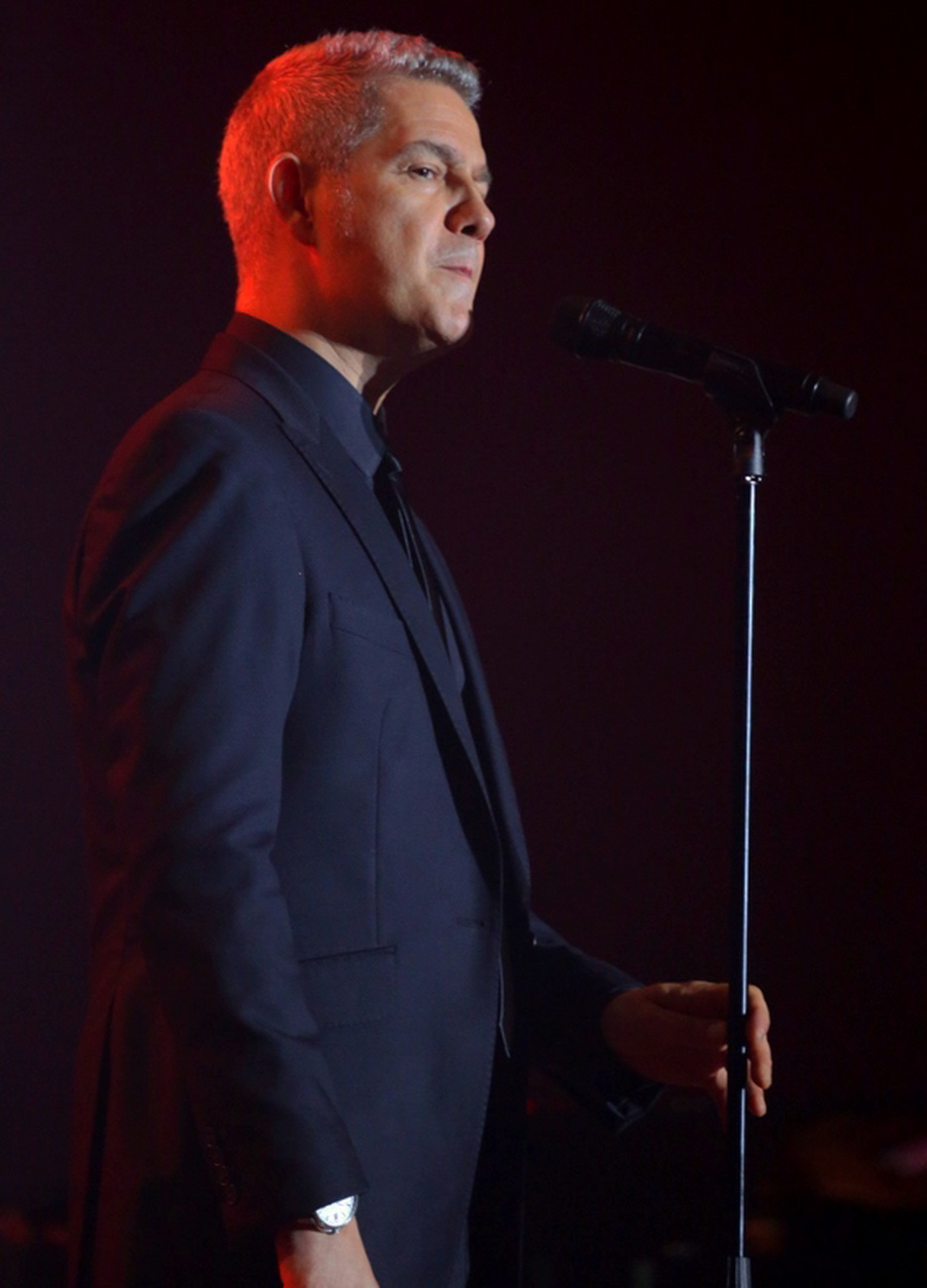
Alessandro Saginaw in Beirut -2015

The following lists events that happened in 2015 in the Lebanese Republic.

== Incumbents ==
- President: Tammam Salam (acting)
- Prime Minister: Tammam Salam

== Events ==
=== January ===
- 5 January – Lebanon implements stricter immigration rules on its Syrian border in response to the refugee crisis caused by the Syrian Civil War.
- 10 January – A suicide attack by al-Nusra Front at a café in Tripoli kills at least seven people.
- 24 January – Islamic State group kills eight Lebanese soldiers in the northeastern Lebanese village of Ras Baalbek.
- 27 January – Israeli security forces claim that Hezbollah and forces loyal to the President of Syria Bashar al-Assad are responsible for firing rockets from Syrian territory onto the Golan Heights into the mount Hermon sky resort.
- 28 January – Following a January 18 airstrike against a Hezbollah convoy, Hezbollah targets an Israeli military convoy near the Lebanon border at the Shebaa farms area, killing two and wounding another seven. While the Israeli military responds with artillery fire upon several South Lebanon border villages and Shebaa Farms, Hezbollah responds with mortar shells. Cross fire fighting kills a Spanish UN peacekeeper in the town of Ghajar.

== Deaths ==
1 January – Omar Karami, politician (born 1934)
