= Stavro Jabra =

Cartoonist and illustrator

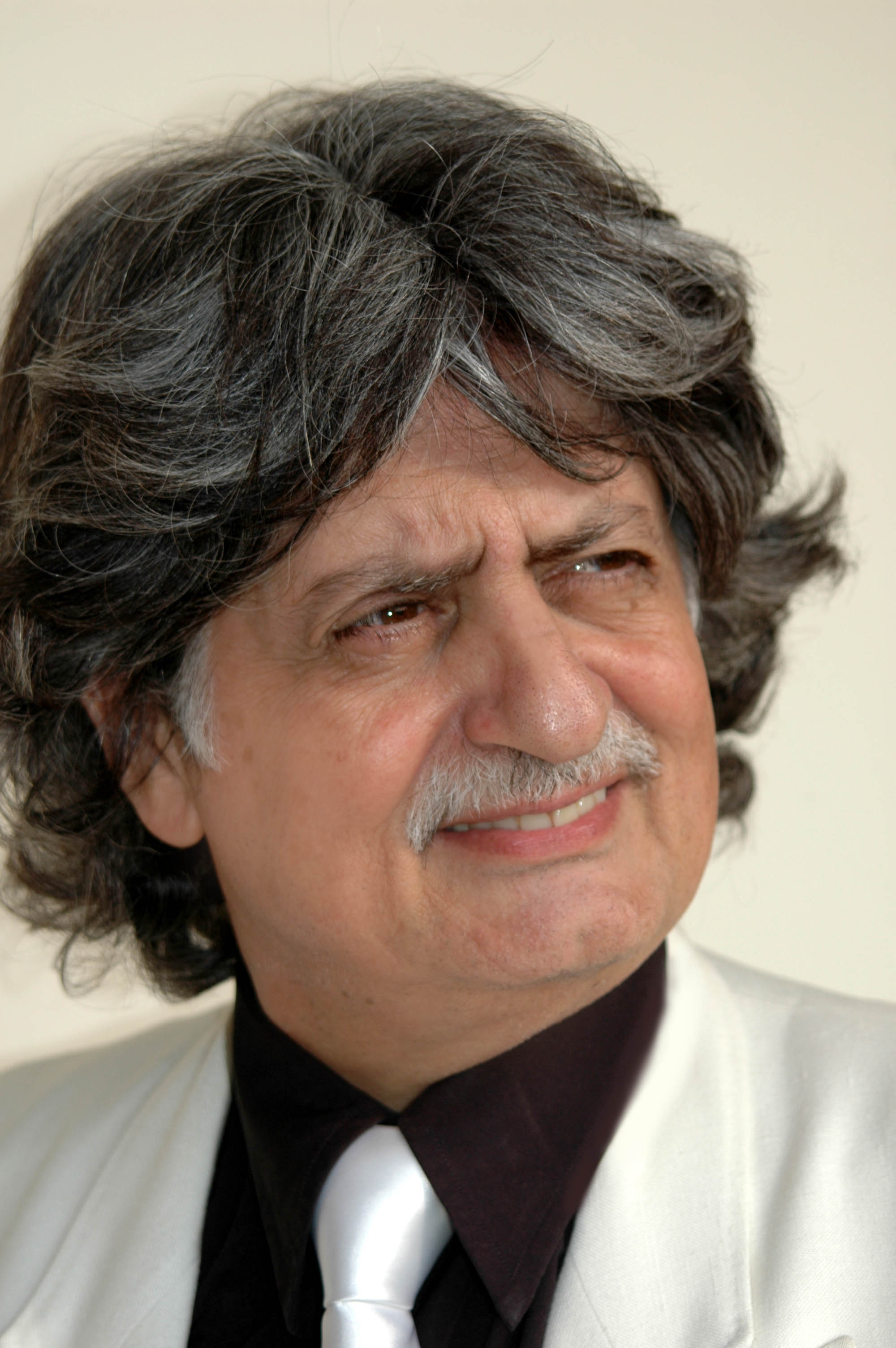
- Born: February 18, 1947; Lebanon
- Died: March 12, 2017 (aged 70)
- Occupations: Cartoonist, illustrator

Stavro Jabra (February 18, 1947 – March 12, 2017) was a Lebanese cartoonist and illustrator, better known as Stavro. His work reflected the current events in Lebanon, the Middle East and the world in general. For forty years, his cartoons about topical news in Lebanon and the Middle East were printed in Lebanese newspapers. His work was also published in international newspapers such as in Der Spiegel, Jeune Afrique, Le Monde, Le Courrier International and the New York Times.

== Cartoons books ==
- 1971: CARICATURES STAVRO
- 1974: LA GUERRE DU PETROLE
- 1978: STAVROSCOPE 1975 – 76 – 77
- 1979: STAVROSCOPE 78
- 1979: DES SEINS CON LIT
- 1980: LIBAN MON HUMOUR
- 1982: VIE ET MORT SANS LEGENDE (LIBAN)
- 1982: COLOMBES DE GUERRE (LIBAN)
- 1982: MUR DU SANG
- 1985: DOLLARMES
- 1987: STARFACE
- 1989: SOURIEZ A LA SYRIE NOIRE
- 1989: SAM SUFFIT LA SYRIE
- 1991: LES SAIGNEURS DE LA GUERRE
- 1992: RAQUEL MADE IN LEBANON
- 1992: L'AN PIRE' 92
- 1993: YA SALAM
- 1996: STAVRO TRAIT SPECIAL
- 1997: FEMMES A CROQUER
- 2007: VIVRE LEBNAN IN CARTOONS
