= 1993 in Lebanon =

- Decades: 1970s; 1980s; 1990s; 2000s; 2010s
- See also: Other events of 1993; Timeline of Lebanese history

The following lists events that happened during 1993 in Lebanon.

== Incumbents ==
- President: Elias Hrawi
- Prime Minister: Rafic Hariri

== Events ==
- July 25 - Operation Accountability: Israeli forces attack Lebanon at the beginning of a week-long campaign.

== Births ==
- February 10 – Mia Khalifa, Lebanese American pornographic actress
