= 2019 Tripoli shooting =

Terrorist attack in Tripoli, Lebanon

- Location of Tripoli in Lebanon.
- Location: Tripoli, Lebanon
- Date: 3 June 2019; 23:30
- Target: Police and soldiers
- Attack type: Mass shooting
- Weapons: Gun and explosive
- Deaths: 5 (including the perpetrator)
- Injuries: 0
- Victims: Two police officers and two soldiers

On 3 June 2019, a gunman killed four security members—two police officers and two soldiers—in Tripoli, Lebanon. The attacker was a recent member of the militant group Islamic State (ISIS), but no group claimed responsibility for the attack. The attack took place when security forces were dispatched to the city's streets to ensure citizen safety at the end of the Ramadan and Eid al-Fitr holidays. The attacker was identified by the authorities and the Lebanese army as Abdel Rahman Mabsout; he was a former ISIS member who had participated in the Syrian Civil War against the Syrian government. He was detained and tried for fighting for ISIS when he returned from Syria in 2016 but was released after a year in jail in late 2017.

== Background ==
Tripoli, Lebanon, has suffered many attacks during the eight years of civil war in Syria between members of rival groups fighting against President Bashar al-Assad. Many of the fighters have lived in Tripoli, as have many extremists who fought against the Lebanese army in the past.

Lebanese authorities said that, after the Syrian Civil War, especially between 2013 and 2016, there were many terrorist attacks, including bombings, within Lebanon. In the years since then, security has improved, however.

ISIS claimed responsibility for two suicide bombers who killed 89 people and wounded more than 200 in the Bourj el-Barajneh suburb of Beirut in 2015. They targeted this neighborhood because it was a Shia area, where many residents support Hezbollah, which fights inside Syria against ISIS.

In December 2018, Lebanese authorities said the security forces had stopped a bombing plot by ISIS during the country's parliamentary elections. The militant group used buckets of cheese to smuggle explosives from Syria into Lebanon. Attacks were planned against temples, Christian churches and places of worship, and military targets. Police uncovered the plot, codenamed "Lethal Cheese", after months of surveillance.

ISIS and al-Qaeda have usually accepted responsibility for previous terrorist attacks in Lebanon.

== Incident ==
A gunman attacked a Lebanese Internal Security Forces (ISF) patrol in Tripoli killing two police officers and two soldiers at 23:30 (Lebanese time) on Monday 3 June 2019. Tripoli is Lebanon's second largest city—a coastal city in the north of the country. The incident happened at the end of the Ramadan, Eid al-Fitr holidays, when the security forces were trying to keep citizens safe for the holidays. The gunman, who rode on a motorcycle, opened fire on police and an army patrol vehicle. The incident began near of a branch of the Lebanese Central bank, then the shooter started driving around and shooting at police and army vehicles. During the incident, the assailant, Abdel Rahman Mabsout, killed four people. At least four civilian cars and one police vehicle were badly damaged. The names of the four officers and soldiers killed in the terrorist attack were: Lieutenant Hassan Farahat (29); Sergeant Johnny Khalil (26); Corporal Yousef Faraj (36); and Private Ibrahim Saleh (21).

Police opened fire and used tear gas against the unknown shooter, who then drove to a residential building. He entered the building and shot his way up its stairs and finally entered a fourth floor apartment which was empty. Security forces and the shooter fought for about an hour, but the gunman was cornered and when he ran out of ammunition, he then blew himself up inside the apartment. Parts of the nine-floor building, especially the fourth floor, were heavily damaged.

The apartment's owner, Kamal Ferri, told reporters that nobody was inside the apartment when the gunman entered the building. He added the gunman entered his apartment after shooting at people in the street. He said,"Thank God there was nobody in the house, and my door is not made of steel, it is a wooden door so I think he broke the door and he walked in."

Lebanon's Interior Minister Raya El Hassan told news agencies the attacker had been identified and his name was Abdul-Rahman Mabsout. He had earlier belonged to ISIS and the extremist groups who fought against Bashar al-Assad. He was quickly arrested when he entered Lebanon in 2016. But he was released from Roumieh Prison in late 2017, and is suspected to be a "lone wolf".

== Reactions ==
Prime Minister Saad Al-Hariri said, "all measures that protect the security of Tripoli and its people must be taken and the remnants of terrorism must be uprooted." Lebanon's defence minister Elias Bou Saab said, the day after attack, that the details of the incident were still not clear, and it was thought to be a piece of a larger terrorist plan. It was known that Mabsout had joined the ISIS group in Syria, and he spent a year in prison after he came back to Lebanon in 2016, before being released in 2017. No group had claimed responsibility for the attack yet.

President Michel Aoun said, "Any tampering with security will receive a quick and decisive response. What happened in Tripoli will not affect stability in the country." The Lebanese Interior Minister, Raya Haffar El Hassan said on Twitter: "The first night of Eid in Tripoli was very painful, but it's over now. The security forces and the army paid a heavy price to maintain security of the city... May God have mercy on our martyrs." At a news conference the next day, she called it a "lone wolf attack" and a "new form of terrorism". She added it was not possible to stop all such attacks, even in more advanced countries than Lebanon.

Tripoli MP Mohammed Kabbara said, "What happened has serious implications, because the perpetrators are people who were deceived by one or more parties in the context of using Tripoli as a mailbox to send bloody messages." Former Lebanese MP Mustapha Allouch said that he was surprised the assailant had been released from jail, with a known history of fighting with Daesh in Syria. He emphasized that, pending investigations, the motives behind the attack were not known. MP Hikmat Deeb, of the Free Patriotic Movement group, tweeted his zero tolerance for terrorism.

The American Embassy in Lebanon affirmed that it "stands by the legitimate security institutions in their war on terror." Bahrain’s Ministry of Foreign Affairs condemned the terrorist attack and all forms of violence, extremism and terrorism, and asked for an end to terrorist groups' funding.

The Arab League (AL) condemned the attack on Tripoli. Mahmoud Afifi, speaker of the AL chief, wished a speedy recovery for people injured in the incident and peace for families of the victims. He added that the Pan-Arab organization will cooperate with Lebanon to stop terrorism.
