= Ahmad Sami Minkara =

Lebanese military officer and politician (1937/1938–2023)

Minister of Tourism
- In office 1992
- Preceded by: Talal Arslan
- Succeeded by: Michel Samaha

Minister of Education and Higher Education
- In office 2004–2005
- Preceded by: Samir Jisr
- Succeeded by: Ghassan Salamé

Personal details
- Born: 1937/1938 Tripoli, Lebanon
- Died: 24 July 2023 (aged 85)
- Occupation: Military officer

Ahmad Sami Minkara (1937/1938 – 24 July 2023) was a Lebanese politician. He served as Minister of Tourism in 1992 and was Minister of Education and Higher Education from 2004 to 2005.

Minkara died on 24 July 2023, at the age of 85.
