= 1935 Lebanon tobacco protests =

In June 1935 protests erupted across Lebanon and Syria. The protests were organised in response to the announcement by French colonial authorities of the establishment of a new tobacco monopoly under the Regie. Groups from across society participated in the protests, including students, tobacco workers, feminist groups, leftist organisations and members of the Maronite community. The protests not only voiced economic grievances but took on an anti-imperial tone and expressed national political frustration that cut across all groups in society. The tobacco protests in Lebanon were not necessarily an exceptional event for the time period as protests and revolts had characterized many of the areas of the region in the early 20th century. In fact during 1935 there were a number of other notable protests including tribal revolts in the Middle Euphrates, the student Wafd protests in Egypt, and also the concurrent tobacco protests in Syria.

== Origins of the Regie ==
The Régie Co-Intéressée Libanaise des Tabacs et Tombacs (the Regie) was founded in 1935. It was established in the context of France's attempts to accelerate industrialization in its mandate territories through introducing new labor policies and decrees.

From 1929 until 1935, Lebanon's tobacco industry operated under what was called the banderole system. According to the banderole system there were no limitations on the cultivation of tobacco. It also did away with the centralization of the sale of tobacco and reduced organisation in the importation of foreign tobacco. This ‘laissez faire' attitude led to overproduction and saturation of the market, destroying numerous tobacco manufacturers in the process.

It was announced by Comte de Martel, the acting French High Commissioner in Lebanon, in November 1934 that France intended to move away from the banderole system and place the tobacco industry under state monopoly. It has been argued that France's reasoning for introducing a state monopoly was because of its treasury's need for increased revenue to support its expanding bureaucracies in its various territories. In 1935, a sub-commission presented its findings on how the new fiscal regime, including the proposed tobacco monopoly, would function and be organised. The laws that emerged from this report were finalized in 1935 and governed the operation of the Regie. These laws were known as ‘Cahier des Charges.'

== June 1935 protest ==
In response to the formation of the Regie, the Maronite Patriarch, along with political leaders and various social organizations, including the Arab Feminist Union (AFU), called for a peaceful protest in June 1935. Everyday for a week workers took to the streets in Beirut, Tripoli, Homs, and Damascus to voice their opposition to the Regie. In Beirut, approximately 50% of store owners and merchants joined the protest while the entirety of Tripoli closed down. However, the majority of protesters were women workers. The AFU was instrumental in organizing the nationwide campaign for boycotting the Regie; it was the first of the various social groups involved to call on women and men to participate in the campaign.

Opposition to the Regie was rooted in economic grievances and concerns over unemployment and displacement of workers. Indeed, the creation of the tobacco monopoly in 1935 caused the displacement of 1,500 to 3,000 workers from the old cigarette factories. The workers that took to the street demanded that they be guaranteed work under the Regie as well as indemnities for unemployment from the French authorities.

The June 1935 protest was prefaced by other periods of discontent with the new monopoly. In December 1934, a group of workers sent a request to the Lebanese President, the mandate parliament, and the French authorities that they not establish the monopoly, the request was the embodied discontent of five thousand tobacco workers and their families.

While core participants of the protest were tobacco workers, the protest came to be a way for other members of society to express their discontent with the French colonial authorities.

== The Arab Feminist Union (AFU) ==
The Arab Feminist Union (AFU) in Lebanon emerged in the 1930s but wasn't technically established until 1944. The AFU boasted members from all religious sects but was primarily middle-class in nature and didn't necessarily have the same priorities as protesting women tobacco workers. While women tobacco workers were concerned with unemployment and fair compensation for their work, the AFU and its members focused on the social impediments of tobacco.

The AFU founded the "Committee for the Advancement of the Moral Order" on the eve of the anti-Regie campaign in June 1935. The Committee focused on the connection between women and the nation and understood feminism in nationalist terms; they understood the welfare of the nation as being dependent upon the welfare of women as mothers. The AFU emphasised women's role and responsibility in embodying and upholding the moral order, the AFU claimed that in doing this they would also be upholding the nation's morality.

In June 1935, the AFU was heavily involved in the organization of the protests. The AFU joined up with university students; the two groups unified around the slogan: "A Bas le Monopole qui arrache d'entre les mains du people la derniere resource nationale (down with the monopoly that took away from the hands of the people that last national resource)."

== Women tobacco workers ==
During and following WW2, hundreds of Lebanese women joined the industrial workforce due to the increase in the cost of living, and many of these women began to work in the tobacco industry. Women were a significant part of the tobacco industry at the time of the anti-Regie campaign, apart from plowing the field women were involved in every aspect of tobacco production. This is one reason why women tobacco workers made up the largest group within the anti-Regie protests.

The implementation of the Regie was of significance to women tobacco workers as it introduced policies that prevented women workers from receiving fair pay for their work, achieving job permanency, and upward mobility. The Cahier des Charges did not necessitate the automatic transfer of tobacco workers to the new Regie which meant many women tobacco workers were faced with financial instability in the wake of the new tobacco monopoly.

Women tobacco workers had a history of protesting for workers' rights. In November 1930, hundreds of women tobacco workers met at the government's central office in Beirut to protest the increase in mechanization in factories under the French authorities, fearing its impact on their job security. It has been suggested that the protests of 1930 and 1935 demonstrate an early connection between women tobacco worker activism and unionization. It has also been argued that working women, more so than any other group involved in the anti-Regie resistance, understood colonialism as intrinsic to the exploitation of their labor as women.
