= 2022 cholera outbreak in Lebanon =

Disease outbreak in Lebanon

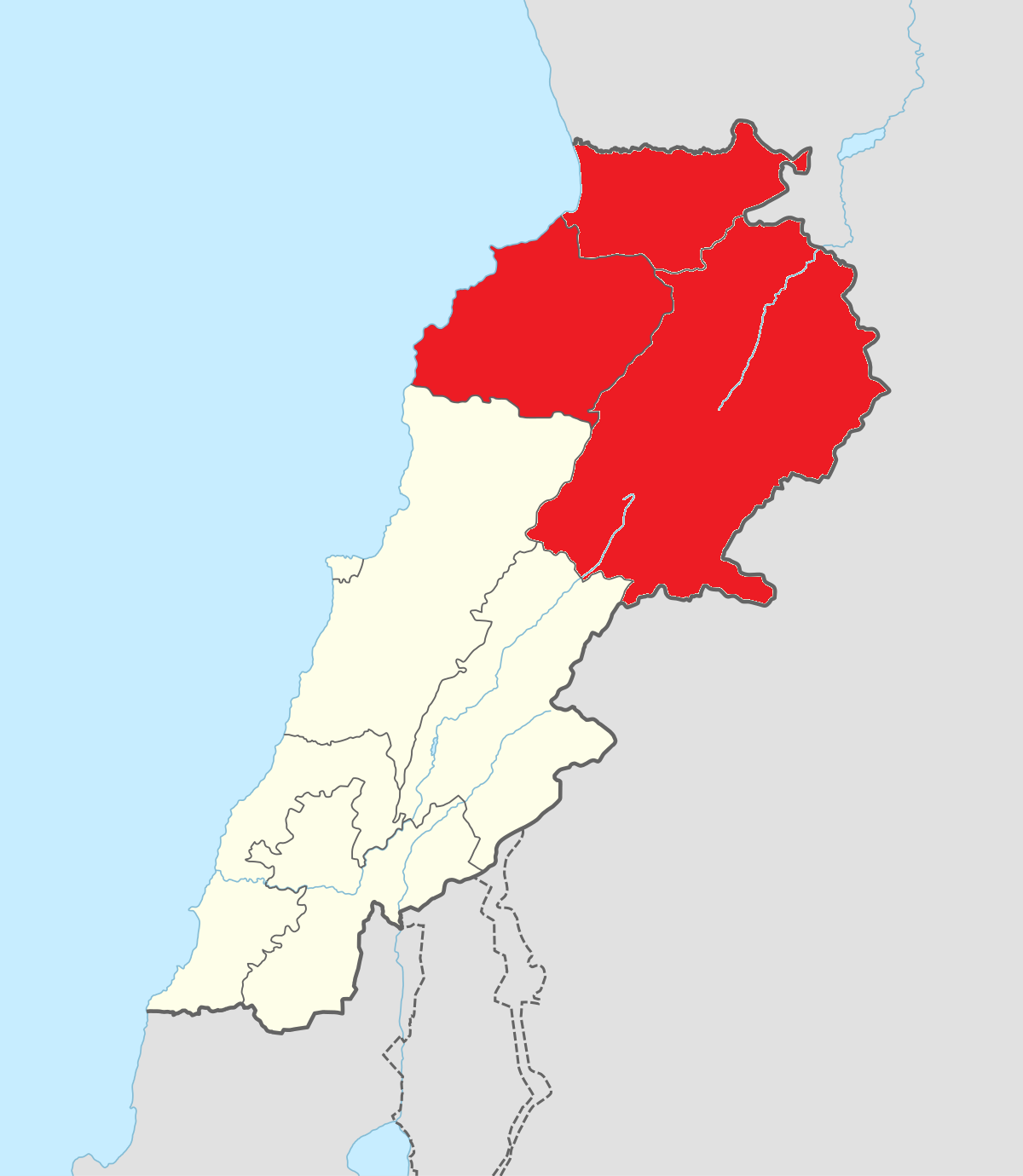
Governorates of Lebanon in which cholera cases were confirmed (as of October 14, 2022).

In October 2022, an outbreak of cholera began in Lebanon. It is likely the result of a serious outbreak in neighboring Syria, which is itself traced back to contaminated water in the Euphrates.

This outbreak is the first incidence of cholera in Lebanon since 1993. By December 9, there stands a total of 5,105 cholera suspected and confirmed cases have been reported along with a total of 23 associated deaths. In June 2023, the Lebanon Ministry of Health announced that the cholera outbreak that began in October 2022 was over.

== Background ==
=== Cholera ===
Cholera is an infection of the small intestine by some strains of a species of bacterium known as Vibrio cholerae. Symptoms may range from none to mild to severe. They include large amounts of watery diarrhea as well as vomiting and muscle cramps. Diarrhea can be so severe that it leads within hours to severe dehydration and kidney failure.

If people with cholera are treated quickly and properly, the mortality rate is less than 1%; with untreated cholera, the mortality rate rises to 50–60%.

=== Outbreak in Syria ===
A cholera outbreak is currently ongoing in Syria which was declared officially on September 10, 2022. Between September 10 and 30, 10,000 suspected cases have been detected. On 22 October 2022, the Syria Ministry of Health reported a cholera outbreak in 13 of 14 governorates, with a total of 44 deaths and 942 confirmed cases.

The UN Humanitarian Coordinator stated that according to a rapid assessment, the outbreak is linked to people drinking unsafe water from the Euphrates and using contaminated water to irrigate crops, resulting in food contamination. He said that the outbreak was compounded by the ongoing civil war, as much of the already vulnerable population of Syria is reliant on unsafe water sources.

== Timeline ==
=== October ===
==== First cases ====
On October 6, 2022, Firas al-Abiad, the head of the Health Ministry of Lebanon, announced that the country has detected its first case of cholera since 1993. The case, recorded on the previous day, was from the northern province of Akkar, and the infected person was a Syrian national receiving treatment.

On October 7, another case was confirmed, and it was announced that there are several other suspected cases. An official in the ministry said that it was highly probable that the outbreak originated in Syria, although there were no confirmed links yet.

==== First death ====
By October 12, the number of confirmed cased had risen to 26, as declared by the ministry. On the same day, the first death from the disease was announced.

==== Other developments ====
By October 21, there was a total of 227 cases and 7 deaths. By October 27, according to the Ministry of Public Health, there were a total of 803 suspected and confirmed cases, with at least 11 deaths reported. By December 9, there stands a total of 5,105 cholera suspected and confirmed cases have been reported along with a total of 23 associated deaths. Children are said to make up approximately 50% of all cases, and children aged between zero and four years make up around a third of all cases in Lebanon.

== Responses ==
According to L'orient-Le Jour, the response of the Lebanese government is based on three main pillars - raising awareness of sanitary measures, providing clean water to all households on a permanent basis, and ensuring safe wastewater treatment and disposal.

The Lebanese Health Minister said that for the government, "the primary issue is prevention that contributes to limiting the spread of the pandemic. Prevention is more important than cure." He met with representatives of vaccine factories in Lebanon, who confirmed the availability of large quantities of vaccines sufficient for the next eight months, in addition to the availability of raw materials needed to manufacture the vaccine.
