= Hassan Hallak =

Lebanese historian (1946–2023)

Hassan Ali Hallak
- حسّان علي حَلاّق
- Born: 1946; Beirut, Lebanon
- Died: 15 May 2023 (aged 77); Beirut, Lebanon
- Occupations: Historian, academic, and writer

Hassan Ali Hallak (Arabic: حسّان علي حَلاّق, romanized: Ḥassān ʻAlī ḥalāāq; 1946 – 15 May 2023) was a Lebanese historian, academic, and writer, known mostly for his work on the origins of the Beiruti families, and Beirut's history during the Ottoman era.

== Biography ==
Hallak was born in Beirut in 1946. He obtained his PhD in history from the University of Alexandria in 1981, then went back to Beirut where he taught Islamic and Arab history at the Lebanese University, and later at Beirut Arab University.

Hallak was noted for being the first person to extract, verify, and publish the records of the Islamic court of Beirut, upon which many of his published books and studies were based. Several of these documents helped in rewriting certain aspects of Beiruti and Lebanese history during the Ottoman era. He was also the first person to extract, verify, and publish the records and documents of the Beirut Municipality. His collection includes about one hundred thousand unpublished documents.

In 2007, he received the Alexandria University Appreciation Award. He was also awarded the Arab Historian Certificate from the Union of Arab Historians (1993), the Medal of Appreciation from the Moroccan University Graduates Association (1999), the Rafic Hariri Medal (2008), and a certificate of appreciation from the Union of Arab Historians (1993), among others. He was also a candidate to receive the King Faisal Prize for Islamic Studies in 1995 CE (1415 AH).

Hallak died on 15 May 2023, at the age of 77.

== Works ==
Hallak wrote more than 60 books about Islamic, Arab, Ottoman, Lebanese, and Beiruti histories, many of which were translated into English, French, German, and Turkish.

His most notable works are the large multi-volume Encyclopedia of the Beiruti families (Arabic: موسوعة العائلات البيروتية), The Attitude of the Ottoman Empire towards the Zionist Movement 1897-1909 (Arabic: موقف الدولة العثمانية من الحركة الصهيونية 1897 - 1909), Role of the Jews and International Powers in dethroning Sultan Abdulhamid II 1908-1909 (Arabic: دور اليهود والقوى الدولية في خلع السلطان عبد الحميد الثاني عن العرش 1908-1909), and Memoirs of Selim Ali Salam (Arabic: مذكرات سليم علي سلام).
