= Hubert Fattal =

Lebanese businessman (1970–2022)

- Born: 22 October 1970; Beirut, Lebanon
- Died: 6 March 2022 (aged 51); Mansourieh, Lebanon
- Education: Parsons School of Design; Goldsmiths, University of London
- Occupations: Company chairman; Designer; Perfumer

Hubert Fattal (22 October 1970–6 March 2022) was a Lebanese businessman, designer and perfumer. He was the chairman of a company which had been established by his grandfather in 1897. He was murdered at his home in Mansourieh in March 2022.

== Biography ==
Fattal was born in Beirut on 22 October 1970. His family members were businesspeople originally from Aleppo, Syria. His grandfather, the Damascene born Khalil Fares Fattal, founded the Khalil Fattal et Fils company in Damascus in 1897. His father, Bernard Fattal, was the chairman of the Khalil Fattal et Fils company and died in a road accident in Cairo, Egypt, in September 2009. His mother was Marie Christine Asfar. He had two younger brothers, Bertrand and Jean. The latter died in a traffic accident in 2018.

Hubert Fattal graduated from Parsons School of Design in Paris receiving a degree in fine arts. He obtained his MA degree in fine arts from Goldsmiths, University of London. He also founded a perfume company, Fragrances Hubert Fattal. Following the death of his father Fattal became the chairman of the Fattal distribution group based in Beirut.

He was the honorary of consul of Sweden in Zahlé between October 1993 and June 2001 and the honorary consul general of Sweden in Lebanon from July 2001.

On 6 March 2022 Fattal was killed at his home in Mansourieh. Two days later two perpetrators of Syrian nationality were arrested.

=== Work ===
Fattal was the designer of the award of the Beirut Municipality. He participated in an exhibition by the National Heritage Foundation in Lebanon in 2002. He had several perfume brands for both body and home, including Fig Tree Bay. He also designed and produced scented candles.
