= 2020 Baabda prison escape =

Incident in Lebanon

On 21 November 2020, 69 inmates escaped from a prison in Baabda, Lebanon.

It was reported that the prisoners smashed their cell doors and attacked prison guards. Fifteen escapees were re-arrested and another four turned themselves in after. Five others were killed, and one was injured in a car crash after stealing the car on the run. Forty-four escapees were not caught. Five escapees were killed when a car that they stole crashed into a tree during a police chase.

In March 2021, police caught the organizer of the jailbreak, a Lebanese man identified only as "A.J.", during a raid in Bourj el-Barajneh. Under interrogation, he admitted to stealing "more than 30" motorcycles and selling them in a refugee camp.

Ever since this event, Lebanese security forces have put extra measures to guard their prisons and keep them safe.
