= 2025 in Lebanon =

- Decades: 2000s; 2010s; 2020s
- See also: Other events of 2025; Timeline of Lebanese history

Events in the year 2025 in Lebanon.

== Incumbents ==
Photo	Post	Name
	President of Lebanon	Vacant (until 9 January 2025)
	President of Lebanon	Joseph Aoun (from 9 January 2025)
	Prime Minister of Lebanon	Najib Mikati (until 8 February)
	Prime Minister of Lebanon	Nawaf Salam (from 8 February)

== Events ==
Ongoing: Israel–Hezbollah conflict (2023–present)

=== January ===
- 9 January – 2022–2025 Lebanese presidential election: The Lebanese parliament elects Lebanese Armed Forces commander Joseph Aoun as President of Lebanon, ending a two-year vacancy.
- 13 January – President Joseph Aoun nominates Nawaf Salam, the head of the International Court of Justice, as Prime Minister of Lebanon. Salam's nomination is confirmed by Parliament later in the day.
- 26 January – The deadline for Israeli forces to leave southern Lebanon under the 2024 Israel–Lebanon ceasefire agreement expires but is extended to February 18.

=== February ===
- 8 February – The Cabinet of Nawaf Salam is inaugurated.
- 14 February – The deputy commander of UNIFIL, Nepalese Major General Chok Bahadur Dhakal, is injured in an attack on a convoy heading to the Beirut–Rafic Hariri International Airport. At least 25 people are subsequently arrested over the attack.
- 18 February – The Israel Defense Forces (IDF) withdraw from all but five positions in southern Lebanon under the 2024 Israel–Lebanon ceasefire agreement which expires the same day.
- 23 February – The funeral of Hezbollah leader Hassan Nasrallah, who was killed in an Israeli airstrike in 2024, is held in Beirut.
- 26 February – The Salam cabinet wins a confidence motion in parliament with the support of 95 of 128 MPs.

=== March ===
- 11 March – Four captives taken by Israel during its war against Hezbollah are released and repatriated to Lebanon.
- 13 March –
  - A fifth Lebanese captive taken by Israel during its war against Hezbollah is released and repatriated.
  - Rodolphe Haykal is appointed as commander of the Lebanese Armed Forces.
- 16 March – Syria accuses Hezbollah of killing three Syrian soldiers. Hezbollah denies, while Lebanese sources say the soldiers entered Lebanon first and were killed by local armed groups.
- 17 March – Lebanon and Syria agree to a ceasefire after border clashes kill 10 and wound 52.
- 22 March – In the first rocket attack from Lebanon since December 2024, at least five rockets are fired at Metula, causing no casualties. In response, the IDF launches airstrikes on southern Lebanon, killing one person.
- 27 March – Karim A. Souaid is appointed as governor of the Banque du Liban.
- 28 March – The IDF carries out airstrikes on Beirut for the first time since the ceasefire with Hezbollah came into effect.

=== April ===
- 20 April – Three soldiers are killed in the explosion of ammunition being transported inside an army vehicle in Braiqaa.
- 24 April – The World Bank reaches an agreement to provide a $250 million loan to Lebanon as part of efforts to resolve its ongoing energy crisis.

=== May ===
- 4 May – 2025 Lebanese municipal elections.

=== June ===
- 5 June – Israel launches airstrikes on suspected Hezbollah drone factories in southern Beirut.
- 10 June – The European Union adds Lebanon to its list of high risk jurisdictions for money laundering and terrorism financing.
- 11 June – Former Economy Minister Amin Salam is arrested while being investigated for alleged falsification, embezzlement of public funds, and blackmailing insurance companies.

=== July ===
- 15 July – Israeli airstrikes in the Beqaa Valley kill 12 people; namely seven Syrian nationals and five Hezbollah fighters.
- 17 July – The Court of Appeal of Paris orders the release and immediate expulsion from France of Lebanese leftwing militant Georges Ibrahim Abdallah, who had been convicted for the killings of American diplomat Charles R. Ray and Israeli diplomat Yacov Bar-Simantov in 1982 and detained since 1984. He is released and deported on 25 July.
- 29 July – A court-martial convicts six people over the killing of an Irish UNIFIL peacekeeper in Al-Aqbiya in 2022 and sentences the main suspect to death.

=== August ===
- 6 August – Three of the country's most wanted drug dealers are killed in a shootout with soldiers in Baalbek.
- 9 August – Six soldiers are killed in an explosion at a suspected Hezbollah weapons depot in Zibqin.
- 18 August – The Iraqi government announces the destruction of Lebanon's largest captagon manufacturing facility in Yammoune following cooperation between Iraqi and Lebanese authorities.
- 21 August –
  - Lebanon begins the disarmament of Palestinian factions, starting with the handover of weapons from the Bourj el-Barajneh refugee camp in Beirut to the Lebanese army.
  - An Israeli citizen detained by Lebanese forces after illegally crossing the Israel–Lebanon border in 2024 is returned to Israel.
- 28 August –
  - Visiting US ambassador to Turkey Tom Barrack issues an apology after telling a group of journalists to "act civilised" and "animalistic" during a press conference at Baabda Palace.
  - The United Nations Security Council unanimously votes to terminate UNIFIL's mandate at the end of 2026.

=== September ===
- 5 September – Ministers from Hezbollah and the Amal Movement stage a walkout during a cabinet meeting in protest over proposals to disarm Hezbollah.
- 11 September – The government issues a license for Starlink to operate in the country.
- 15 September – Authorities announce the arrest in Bulgaria of Igor Grechushki, the Russian owner of the cargo vessel that delivered a shipment of ammonium nitrate to Lebanon that caused the 2020 Beirut explosion.

=== October ===
- 4 October – Singer Fadel Chaker, who is wanted over his role in the 2013 Sidon clash, surrenders to authorities in Ain al-Hilweh after 12 years in hiding.
- 10 October – The General Directorate of General Security announces the discovery of a plot by Israel to carry out assassinations and bomb attacks nationwide, resulting in several arrests.
- 17 October – A Lebanese court orders the release on bail of Hannibal Gaddafi, the son of former Libyan leader Muammar Gaddafi, who has been detained in Lebanon since 2015 on charges related to the disappearance of Shiite cleric Musa al-Sadr in 1978.

=== November ===
- 6 November – Israeli jets carry out multiple airstrikes on Taybeh, Tayr Debba, Ayta al-Jabal, Zawtar al-Sharqiyah, and Kfar Dounin, after warning residents to evacuate.
- 10 November – Hannibal Gaddafi, the son of former Libyan leader Muammar Gaddafi, is granted a US$900,000 bail, ending his nearly 10-year detention in Lebanon involving the 1978 disappearance of Iranian-Lebanese Shia cleric Musa al-Sadr, for which Gaddafi was accused of withholding information but never tried.
- 18 November – Thirteen people are killed in an Israeli airstrike near Ain al-Hilweh.
- 20 November – Noah Zeiter, deemed the most wanted drug trafficker in Lebanon, is arrested by the military following a raid in Baalbek.
- 23 November – Israel carries out an airstrike targeting Haytham Ali Tabatabai, the chief of staff of Hezbollah, in Haret Hreik, killing him and four others.
- 26 November – Lebanon and Cyprus sign a final agreement to demarcate their common maritime border.
- 30 November – Pope Leo XIV arrives in Lebanon as part of a three-day visit.

=== December ===
- 3 December – The first direct negotiations between Lebanon and Israel since 1983 are held at UNIFIL headquarters in Naqoura.
- 4 December – Gunmen attack a UNIFIL patrol vehicle in southern Lebanon, resulting in six arrests.
- 13 December – Israel issues an evacuation order in southern Lebanon in preparation of planned airstrikes on Hezbollah targets. The Israeli military later suspends the strike after the Lebanese military requests access to the site.
- 16 December – Former Economy Minister Amin Salam is released on bail while being investigated for alleged falsification, embezzlement of public funds, and blackmailing insurance companies.

== Holidays ==
- 1 January – New Year's Day
- 6 January – Epiphany and Armenian Christmas
- 9 February – St. Maroun Day
- 25 March – Annunciation Day
- 30 March – Eid al-Fitr
- 18 April – Good Friday
- 20 April – Easter Sunday
- 1 May – Labour Day
- 25 May – Liberation and Resistance Day
- 6 June – Eid al-Adha
- 26 June – Islamic New Year
- 15 August – Assumption Day
- 4 September – The Prophet's Birthday
- 22 November – Lebanese Independence Day
- 25 December – Christmas Day

== Deaths ==
- 23 July – Abdallah Bou Habib, 83, minister of foreign affairs and emigrants (2021–2025) and ambassador to the United States (1983–1990)
- 26 July – Ziad Rahbani, 69, musician and composer
- 23 September – Ziad Takieddine, 75, Lebanese-French arms dealer
- 23 November – Haytham Ali Tabatabai, 56–57, chief of staff of Hezbollah
- 13 December – Ghassan Skaff, politician and neurosurgeon, member of parliament (2022–2025).
