= Linda Matar =

Lebanese women's rights activist (1925–2023)

- Born: 25 December 1925
- Died: 2 February 2023 (aged 97)
- Known for: Women's rights activism in Lebanon

Linda Matar (Arabic: ليندا مطر; 25 December 1925 – 2 February 2023) was a Lebanese women's rights activist, who joined the League of Lebanese Women's Rights in 1953. She became president of the league in 1978, presiding for 30 years. She was also president of the Lebanese Council of Women from 1996 to 2000. She was a part of more than 50 conferences world-wide. Matar first starting fighting towards Lebanese gender equality, when she began working in a silk factory at 12 years old.

== Biography ==
Matar was born on 25 December 1925. She first realised the injustices towards Lebanese workers in society in 1938, at age 12, when she stopped going to school to work in a silk factory and had to attend classes at night to provide financially for her parents. Subsequently, Jean Said Makdisi stated in an interview about Matar: "Unlike her contemporaries, Matar was a feminist who came from the factories. She had a different socialization. She knew about feminist theorists like Simone de Beauvoir, though she did not necessarily read them in her time; her feminist stance was grounded in her experience as a working woman."

Matar married at the age of seventeen and had children.

The United Nations Educational, Scientific and Cultural Organization held a tribute to honor Matar's achievements, where she thanked her kids for their support and apologized for not being an attentive mother, as she was more invested in her work. Later, at 90 years old, Matar had eight great-grandchildren, eight grandchildren, and three children.

Matar died on 2 February 2023, at the age of 97.

== Work ==
Along with the fact that Matar worked in a silk factory, where she witnessed first-hand inequality among women, an event that took place when she was 28 also triggered her urge to end Lebanese inequality. In 1952, Matar also witnessed her epileptic neighbor get picked up to go vote at a nearby polling station. The neighbor was a man, who had both mental and physical disabilities. However, because she was a woman, she was not allowed to vote, despite having no disabilities. This is when Matar decided to start being an activist for Lebanese women's rights. She also wanted to demolish laws that went against those rights.

Matar first became a regular member of the League of Lebanese Women's Rights. Later, she moved up to Secretary General. Then finally president of the League of Lebanese Women's Rights in 1978. Then in 1980, Matar introduced a list of laws in which Lebanese women and men would be fully equal. She proposed that women and men would be equal in all laws concerning family status, inheritance, and criminal laws.

Furthermore, Matar was the co-founder of multiple, private Lebanese women's organizations. She represented Lebanese women's rights in over 50 conferences around the world. One conference she attended, in 1995, was the World Conference on Women in Beijing. Another, in 1975, was the UN conference on women in Mexico. In 1996, Matar became the president of the Lebanese Council of Women, resigning in 2000.

Matar also received acknowledgement of her achievements, by Marie Claire, a French magazine, when she was voted as one of "100 Women Who are Moving the World".
