= Ya Libnan =

Lebanese news website

Ya Libnan (Arabic: يا لبنان) Oh Lebanon, is a Lebanese media outlet that delivers English-language news from Beirut to an international audience. Ya Libnan was founded by volunteers in Lebanon immediately after the assassination of Rafik Hariri on 14 February 2005. Since its inception, Ya Libnan has transformed from a blog-style format maintained by three volunteers to an official news site that is supported by over 100 multi-national volunteers.

== Media coverage of Ya Libnan ==
In 2005 The Washington Post's Jefferson Morley called Ya Libnan "The New Media kid on the block". The site started as a web presence for the massive street demonstrations that took place after Hariri's assassination and evolved into a daily news site with cosmopolitan, liberal politics.
