= Timeline of Lebanese history =

This is a timeline of Lebanese history, comprising important legal and territorial changes and political events in Lebanon and its predecessor states. To read about the background to these events, see History of Lebanon. See also the list of presidents of Lebanon and list of prime ministers of Lebanon.

== 14th Century BC ==
Year	Date	Event
1400 BC		The height of the Canaanite town of Ugarit.

== 12th century BC ==
Year	Date	Event
1200 BC		Phoenicians invent the alphabet and the Tyrian Purple which was a major component in their trade.
1200 BC		A crisis led to the Bronze Age collapse. Cities all around the eastern Mediterranean were sacked within a span of a few decades by assorted raiders.

== 9th century BC ==
Year	Date	Event
842 BC		Shalmaneser III devastates the territory of Damascus; Palestine and the Phoenician cities send tribute.
813 BC		Carthage is founded by Phoenicians.

== 8th century BC ==
Year	Date	Event
774 BC		The reign of king Pygmalion of Tyre ends.
739 BC		Hiram II becomes king of Tyre.
730 BC		Mattan II succeeds Hiram II as king.
724 BC		The Assyrians under king Shalmaneser V start a four-year siege of Tyre that ends in 720 BC.
710 BC		Judah, Tyre and Sidon revolt against Assyria.
701 BC		The Assyrian siege of Tyre by king Sennacherib.

== 7th century BC ==
Year	Date	Event
663 BC		The Assyrian siege of Tyre by king Ashurbanipal.

== 6th century BC ==
Year	Date	Event
587 BC		The region is annexed to the Babylonian empire, while Jerusalem fell into their hands.
586 BC		The Babylonians under king Nebuchadnezzar II sieged Tyre for thirteen years without success. Later a compromise peace was made in which Tyre had to pay tribute to the Babylonians. (to 573 BC)
539 BC		Cyrus the Great conquered Phoenicia.

== 4th century BC ==
Year	Date	Event
350 BC		A rebellion in Sidon led by Tennes was crushed by Artaxerxes III, and its destruction was dramatically described by Diodorus Siculus. (to 345 BC)
332 BC		Alexander the Great took Tyre following the city's siege. After Alexander's death Phoenicia witnessed a succession of Hellenistic rulers: Laomedon (323 BC), Ptolemy I (320 BC), Antigonus II (315 BC), Demetrius (301 BC), and Seleucus (296 BC).
315 BC		Alexander's former general Antigonus begins his own siege of Tyre, taking the city a year later.

== 3rd century BC ==
Year	Date	Event
286 BC		Phoenicia (except for Aradus) fell to the Ptolemies of Egypt.

== 2nd century BC ==
Year	Date	Event
197 BC		Phoenicia along with Syria reverted to the Seleucids, and the region became increasingly Hellenized, although Tyre actually became autonomous in 126 BC, followed by Sidon in 111 BC.
140 BC		Beirut was taken and destroyed by Diodotus Tryphon in his contest with Antiochus VII Sidetes for the throne of the Seleucid monarchy. It was later named Laodicea in Phoenicia (Greek: Λαοδικεια ή του Φοινίκη).

== 1st century BC ==
Year	Date	Event
82 BC		Syria, including Phoenicia, were seized by king Tigranes the Great who was later defeated by Lucullus. (to 69 BC)
65 BC		Pompey finally incorporated Phoenicia as part of the Roman province of Syria.
64 BC		Beirut was conquered by Agrippa and the city was renamed in honour of the emperor's daughter, Julia; its full name became Colonia Julia Augusta Felix Berytus.
27 BC		the Pax Romana period, inhabitants of the principal Phoenician cities of Byblos, Sidon, and Tyre were granted Roman citizenship, while economic and intellectual activities flourished. (to AD 180)

== 1st century ==
Year	Date	Event
20		Beirut's school of law was founded, it later became widely known in the surrounding region. Two of Rome's most famous jurists, Papinian and Ulpian (both natives of Phoenicia), were taught at the law school under the Severan emperors.
50		Saint Paul of Tarsus begins his third mission and preaches in Tyre.

== 5th century ==
Year	Date	Event
451		The Maronites, a Christian community named after Saint Maron sought refuge in the mountains of Lebanon.

== 6th century ==
Year	Date	Event
551		Beirut is destroyed by an earthquake and tsunami. About 30,000 were killed in the city alone and, along the Phoenician coast, total casualties were close to 250,000.

== 7th century ==
Year	Date	Event
630		The Marada, a group of autonomous Maronite communities, settled in Mount Lebanon and the surrounding highlands following the conquest of Syria by the Arab caliphate.
632		Calling for a jihad against non-Muslims, Muhammad's successor, Caliph Abu Bakr, brought Islam to the area surrounding Lebanon. (to 634)
661		After the Battle of Yarmuk, Caliph Umar appointed the Arab Muawiyah I, founder of the Umayyad dynasty, as governor of Syria, an area that included present-day Lebanon.
667		Muawiyah negotiated an agreement with Constantine IV, the Byzantine emperor, whereby he agreed to pay Constantine an annual tribute in return for the cessation of Marada incursions.
670		Callinicus of Heliopolis, a Byzantine chemist from Heliopolis, invents the Greek fire in Constantinople.

== 8th century ==
Year	Date	Event
759		An abortive rebellion of Lebanese mountaineers against the Abbasid rule after the harsh treatment of people living in the Lebanese-Syrian region.

== 9th century ==
Year	Date	Event
878		The Jordan valley is occupied by the Tulunids, extending in the north to the outposts in the Anti-Lebanon mountains on the Byzantine border, enabling them to defend Egypt against Abbasid attack. Tulunid Emirate in 893

== 10th century ==
Year	Date	Event
960		Prince 'Allaqa of Tyre proclaimed his independence from the Abbasids and coined money in his own name.
970		The Fatimides settled in Egypt and extended their authority to the coastal region of Bilad al-Sham and Damascus.
986		Under the Fatimid Caliph Al-Hakim bi-Amr Allah, a new religion was born and spread by a man called Ad-Darazi. This was the beginning of the Druze religion and its expansion in several Lebanese regions.

== 12th century ==
Year	Date	Event
1110		Beirut and Sidon are captured.
1124		Tyre resisted the raids but finally capitulated after a long siege.
1179		The Battle of Marj Ayyun took place on 10 June, where an Ayyubid army commanded by Saladin defeated a Crusader army led by King Baldwin IV of Jerusalem.
1182		The Battle of Belvoir Castle in which a Crusader force led by King Baldwin IV of Jerusalem sparred inconclusively with an Ayyubid army from Egypt commanded by Saladin. The theatre of operations included Eilat, the Transjordan, Galilee and Beirut (which witnessed a siege by Saladin that ended in August of the same year).
1187		Saladin conquers virtually all of the Kingdom of Jerusalem with the exception of Tyre, which held out under Conrad of Montferrat.
1192		Richard the Lionheart signed a treaty with Saladin, restoring the Kingdom of Jerusalem to a coastal strip between Jaffa and Beirut.

== 13th century ==
Year	Date	Event
1260		The county of Tripoli becomes a vassal state of the Mongol Empire.
1289		The county of Tripoli falls into the hands of the Mamluks after the attack of Egyptian Sultan Qalawun in March.
1291		The Shia Muslims and Druze, in Lebanon, rebelled against the Mamluks who were busy fighting the European Crusaders and Mongols.

== 14th century ==
Year	Date	Event
1308		The rebellion was crushed by the Mamluks.

== 16th century ==
Year	Date	Event
1516		The Ottoman Sultan Selim I grants Emir Fakhr ad-Din I a semi-autonomous reign in Lebanon.
1570		The Maanid period reaches its peak with the reign of Fakhr ad-Din II. (to 1635)

== 17th century ==
Year	Date	Event
1613		Fakhr ad-Din II is exiled to Tuscany after his inability to defeat the army of Ahmad al Hafiz, the governor of Damascus.
1618		Fakhr ad-Din II returns to Lebanon with the beginning of Muhammad Pasha's reign as the new governor of Damascus.
1622		The Battle of Anjar took place on 31 October, near Majdal Anjar between the army of Fakhr ad-Din II and an Ottoman army led by the governor of Damascus Mustafa Pasha.
1635		By the orders of Murad IV, Kutshuk, the governor of Damascus, defeats Fakhr ad-Din who was later executed in Constantinople.

== 18th century ==
Year	Date	Event
1736		The Lebanese Council of 1736 takes place in which the Maronite Church reforms itself significantly and elaborates rules and canons for the Maronite Church.
1799		Bashir II declines to assist the siege of Acre by Napoleon and Jezzar Pasha. Unable to conquer Acre, Napoleon returned to Egypt, and the death of Jezzar Pasha in 1804 removed Bashir's principal opponent in the area.

== 19th century ==
Year	Date	Event
1831		Bashir II breaks away from the Ottoman Empire, allies with Muhammad Ali of Egypt and assists Muhammad Ali's son, Ibrahim Pasha, in another siege of Acre. This siege lasted seven months, the city falling on 27 May 1832. The Egyptian army, with assistance from Bashir's troops, also attacked and conquered Damascus on 14 June 1832.
1840		After Muhammad Ali's rejection of the requests of the London treaty signed on 15 June 1840, Ottoman and British troops landed on the Lebanese coast on 10 September 1840. Faced with this combined force, Muhammad Ali retreated, and on 14 October 1840, Bashir II surrendered to the British and went into exile.
1841		Conflicts between the Druze and the Maronite Christians exploded. A Maronite revolt against the Feudal class erupted, and lasted until 1858.
1860		A full-scale war erupted between Maronites and Druze. Napoleon III of France sent 7,000 troops to Beirut and helped impose a partition: The Druze control of the territory was recognised as the fact on the ground, and the Maronites were forced into an enclave, arrangements ratified by the concert of Europe in 1861.
1890		The "silk crisis" took place. Cheaper and better quality Chinese silk and silk products flooded Lebanese silk's main market: Europe. The crisis was especially hard considering many had taken on large debt to expand their lands and plant mulberry trees -which leaves were used to feed the worm.

== 20th century ==
Year	Date	Event
1914		After the abolishment of Lebanon's semiautonomous status, Jamal Pasha militarily occupies Lebanon.
1915		Jamal Pasha initiates a blockade of the entire eastern Mediterranean coast. Lebanon witnessed thousands of deaths from widespread famine and plagues. (Great Famine of Mount Lebanon)
1916		Turkish authorities publicly executed 21 Syrians and Lebanese in Damascus and Beirut, respectively, for alleged anti-Turkish activities.
1918		British general Edmund Allenby and Faysal I, son of Sharif Hussein of Mecca, moved into Palestine with British and Arab forces, thus opening the way for the occupation of Lebanon.
1920		France takes control over Lebanese territory after the San Remo conference.
1935		France establishes a tobacco monopoly, followed by the 1935 Lebanon tobacco protests.
1943	22 November	On 22 November, Lebanon gains its independence after national and international pressure following the imprisonment of president Bechara El Khoury and other parliament members by the French.
1948		The 1948 Arab–Israeli War; Palestinian refugees begin arriving in Lebanon.
1958		A civil war erupts but short lived after the intervention of 5,000 US Marines ordered by President Eisenhower upon the request of the Lebanese president Camille Chamoun.
1975		Gunmen from the Phalanges, a Lebanese Christian group, ambush a bus in Beirut, killing 27 of its mainly Palestinian Muslim passengers, initiating the Lebanese Civil War, mainly between Christians (with Israeli support) and Muslims.
1982		Israel launches a full-scale invasion of Lebanon. The south of Lebanon, all the way to Beirut, is occupied by Israel. Pro-Israeli president-elect Bachir Gemayel is assassinated. With Israeli support, the Phalangist militia kills thousands of Palestinians in the Sabra and Shatila massacre. Bachir's elder brother Amine Gemayel is elected president. Hezbollah is founded in Lebanon in opposition to the Israeli occupation of Southern Lebanon.
1988		Outgoing President Amine Gemayel appoints an unelected military government under Christian Commander-in-Chief Michel Aoun.
1990		Michel Aoun flees the country as Syrian troops enter Lebanon. End of the Lebanese civil war.
1992		Wealthy businessman Rafic Hariri, a Muslim moderate, is elected prime minister.

== 21st century ==
Year	Date	Event
2000	May	Israeli withdrawal from southern Lebanon, putting an end to 18 years of Israeli occupation.
2005	February	Following the assassination of Rafic Hariri, who opposed Syrian presence in Lebanon, the Cedar Revolution took place: following massive, peaceful demonstrations, the Syrian troops completely withdrew from Lebanon on 27 April 2005.
2006	July–August	The July War takes place between Hezbollah and Israel. The conflict ends with the acceptance of the United Nations Security Council Resolution 1701 by both Israel and Lebanon.
2007	May–September	2007 Lebanon conflict: fighting between Fatah al-Islam, an Islamist militant organization, and the Lebanese Armed Forces (LAF) on May 20, 2007, in Nahr al-Bared, an UNRWA Palestinian refugee camp near Tripoli.
2008	May	2008 Lebanon conflict: Hezbollah-led opposition fighters seized control of several West Beirut neighborhoods from Future Movement militiamen loyal to the government, in street battles that left 11 dead and 30 wounded. The opposition-seized areas were then handed over to the Lebanese Army.
2011	January–December	2011 Lebanese protests - part of the Arab Spring.
2011	June	Syrian Civil War spillover in Lebanon - Between 2011 and 2017, fighting from the Syrian Civil War spilled over into Lebanon as opponents and supporters of the Syrian Arab Republic traveled to Lebanon to fight and attack each other on Lebanese soil. The Syrian conflict stoked a resurgence of sectarian violence in Lebanon.
2019	October	2019–2020 Lebanese protests - part of the 2018–2020 Arab protests.
2020	August	On August 4, 2020, a massive explosion occurred at the Port of Beirut, Lebanon, resulting in at least 218 deaths, over 7,000 injuries. The explosion was one of the most powerful non-nuclear blasts recorded and the cause is still unknown.2020 Beirut explosion

== See also ==
- Timeline of Beirut
- League of Nations mandate
- List of extrajudicial killings and political violence in Lebanon
