= 2006 in Lebanon =

- Decades: 1980s; 1990s; 2000s; 2010s; 2020s
- See also: History of Lebanon; Timeline of Lebanese history; List of years in Lebanon

The following lists events that happened in 2006 in Lebanon.

== Incumbents ==
- President: Émile Lahoud (until 24 November)
- Prime Minister: Najib Mikati (acting) (starting 19 April)

=== July ===
- July 12 - Hezbollah ambushes a patrol of Israeli soldiers on the border, killing three and capturing two; a further five were killed during a failed Israeli rescue attempt.
- July 13 - Israeli Air Force launches Operation Density and destroys 59 stationary medium-range Fajr rocket launchers positioned throughout southern Lebanon.
- July 21 - Israeli forces invades Lebanon, making it the third Israeli invasion into Lebanon since 1978.

=== August ===
- August 14 - Israeli Defence Forces declares a cessation of military actions against Hezbollah.

=== September ===
- September 8 - Israel formally announces the lifting of its naval blockade of Lebanon.
