= 2010 in Lebanon =

- Decades: 1990s; 2000s; 2010s; 2020s
- See also: Other events of 2010; Timeline of Lebanese history

The following lists events that took place in 2010 in Lebanon.

== Incumbents ==
- President: Michel Suleiman
- Prime Minister: Saad Hariri

== Events ==
=== January ===
- In January 25, 2010, A Boeing 737-800 operating Ethiopian Airlines Flight 409, crashed into the mediterranean sea shortly after takeoff from Beirut due to pilot error, fatigue and poor crew resource management. None of the 90 on board survived.

=== August ===
- 2010 Israel-Lebanon border clash

== Deaths ==
- 4 July – Mohammad Hussein Fadlallah, Shia cleric (born 1935)

=== Full date unknown ===
- As'ad Adib Bayudh, Lebanese Greek Orthodox politician.
