= Une certaine vision du Liban =

2007 book by Michel Aoun

- Front cover of the book
- Author: Michel Aoun
- Language: French
- Publisher: Fayard
- Publication date: 2007
- Media type: Print (Hardcover)
- Pages: 208
- ISBN: 978-2-213-63214-8

Une certaine vision du Liban is a 2007 book by Lebanese General Michel Aoun. Interviewed by Frédéric Domont, Aoun talked about his personal life, the history of Lebanon, the civil war and his role in it as well as the international relations of Lebanon especially with Syria.

It was translated to Arabic by Houda Yammine and published by SADER library under the name My view for Lebanon (Arabic: رؤيتي للبنان). In 2014, Aoun dedicated the Arabic version of the book to Druze leader Walid Jumblatt.
