= 2007 in Lebanon =

- Decades: 1980s; 1990s; 2000s; 2010s; 2020s
- See also: History of Lebanon; Timeline of Lebanese history; List of years in Lebanon

The following lists events that happened in 2007 in Lebanon.

== Incumbents ==
- President: Émile Lahoud (until 24 November), Fouad Siniora (acting) (starting 24 November)
- Prime Minister: Fouad Siniora

== Events ==
=== January ===
- January 23 - Hezbollah-led protesters spark clashes with government loyalists in Lebanon, resulting in 3 deaths and 133 wounded. Opposition forces later call off the general strike they had held.
- January 25 - Beirut Arab University shooting: Clashes between pro- and anti-government activists at Beirut Arab University left 4 people dead and more than 150 injured.

=== February ===
- February 7 - Israel Defense Forces and Lebanese Armed Forces exchange fire at the Israel-Lebanon border.
- February 13 - Bikfaya Bombings: At least three people have been killed in bomb blasts that hit two buses in the village of Bikfaya near Beirut.
- February 14 - Tens of thousands rally in Beirut to mark the second anniversary of the killing of former Prime Minister Rafik Hariri.

=== May ===
- May 10 - President of Syria Bashar al-Assad states that Syria will not cooperate with a United Nations tribunal to try suspects in the suspected assassination of former Prime Minister of Lebanon Rafiq al-Hariri.
- May 20 - Fighting breaks out between Fatah al-Islam militants and Lebanese soldiers at the Nahr al-Bared refugee camp in Tripoli.
- May 21 - The Battle of Nahr al-Bared continues at the Nahr al-Bared refugee camp in Tripoli for a second successive day.
- May 23 - Lebanon's Defence Minister Elias Murr issues an ultimatum to Fatah al-Islam militants in the Nahr el-Bared refugee camp in Tripoli.
- May 29 - Heavy fighting resumes between the Lebanese army and al-Qaeda linked militants at the Nahr el-Bared refugee camp.
- May 30 - The United Nations Security Council establishes an international tribunal to try suspects in the killings of Lebanese political figures including the former Prime Minister Rafik Hariri.

=== June ===
- June 1 - Fighting resumes at the Nahr el-Bared camp between the Lebanese Army and Fatah al-Islam.
- June 3 - Soldiers and Islamist militants clash at a second Palestinian refugee camp in Lebanon.
- June 14 - Lebanon prepares to bury anti-Syrian parliamentarian Walid Eido and nine others killed in yesterday's bombing, with a national day of mourning declared.
- June 21 - Lebanon declares victory over Fatah al-Islam, an al-Qaeda-linked group, after a month-long battle at a Palestinian refugee camp.
- June 24 - A roadside bomb hits a United Nations Interim Force in Lebanon patrol, killing six Spanish-speaking peacekeepers (three of whom were Colombian) and injuring two others.

=== July ===
- July 12 - The Lebanese army has resumed shelling Fatah al-Islam positions inside the Nahr al-Bared refugee camp near Tripoli. All of the refugees have left the camp after recent fighting.
- July 28 - Bernard Kouchner, the French Foreign Minister, arrives in Lebanon to reduce tensions between the Prime Minister of Lebanon Fouad Siniora and the pro-Syrian opposition.

=== August ===
- August 5 - Lebanon holds two by-elections to replace two members of the Parliament of Lebanon, Pierre Amine Gemayel and Walid Eido, killed in violent incidents claimed to be murder. Camille Khoury and Mohamad Amin Itani are declared as the winners of the elections although rival candidate Amin Gemayel has lodged a complaint about Khoury's victory.
- August 6 - The Lebanese government claim that the police have killed Abu Hureira, the second in command of Fatah al-Islam.
- August 17 - France circulates a draft United Nations Security Council resolution extending the mandate of the 13,600 United Nations peacekeeping force in Lebanon.

=== September ===
- September 2 - 2007 Lebanon conflict
  - Fatah al-Islam fighters attempt an escape from the Nahr al-Bared refugee camp north of Tripoli with at least 41 people being killed in fighting and many being injured and captured by the Lebanese army.
  - The Prime Minister of Lebanon Fouad Siniora announces that the government has captured the camp.
  - The leader of Fatah al-Islam is believed to be among the casualties with the Lebanese government conducting DNA tests to confirm his identity.
- September 4 - Lebanon's Defense Minister Elias al-Murr claims that at least 222 Fatah al-Islam militants were killed during the struggle.
- September 7 - The Lebanese Army declares victory after ending a three-month conflict with Fatah al-Islam militants in Nahr el-Bared.
- September 19 - A car bomb in Beirut kills Lebanese legislator Antoine Ghanem of the Christian Phalange party and at least seven others.
- September 25 - The Parliament of Lebanon adjourns a session to elect a new President of Lebanon until 23 October 2007.

=== November ===
- November 16 - United Nations Secretary-General Ban Ki-moon holds talks with Lebanese political leaders, trying to break an impasse over the election of the next President.
- November 23 - The term of Lebanese President Emile Lahoud ends with no successor and a political dispute over who is in power.

=== December ===
- December 12 - The Lebanese armed forces' chief of operations, General François al-Hajj, is killed in a bomb attack in Beirut.
