= 2009 in Lebanon =

- Decades: 1980s; 1990s; 2000s; 2010s; 2020s
- See also: Other events of 2009; Timeline of Lebanese history

The following lists events that happened in 2009 in Lebanon

== Incumbents ==
- President: Michel Suleiman
- Prime Minister: Fouad Siniora (until 9 November), Saad Hariri (starting 9 November)

== Events ==
- In the 2009 Lebanese general election, the American-backed party March 14 Alliance defeated Hezbollah in the polls.
