= 2008 in Lebanon =

- Decades: 1980s; 1990s; 2000s; 2010s; 2020s
- See also: History of Lebanon; Timeline of Lebanese history; List of years in Lebanon

The following lists events that happened in 2008 in Lebanon.

== Incumbents ==
- President: Fouad Siniora (acting) (until 25 May), Michel Suleiman (starting 25 May)
- Prime Minister: Fouad Siniora

== Events ==
=== May ===
- May 8 - 2008 conflict in Lebanon: Fighting erupts after an 18 month political crisis between pro-government and opposition militias across in Beirut after the government shuts down Hezbollah's telecommunication network. Fighting soon spread to other areas of the country, including Tripoli and Aley.
- May 21 - The Doha Agreement is signed by rival factions, ending the conflict.
