= As'ad Adib Bayudh =

Lebanese Greek Orthodox politician

As'ad Adib Bayudh (Arabic: أسعد اديب بيوض; died 2010) was a Lebanese Greek Orthodox politician. He was elected to the Parliament of Lebanon from the Marjeyoun-Hasbaya constituency in southern Lebanon in the 1960 and 1964 elections.
