= History of Lebanon =

The history of Lebanon covers the history of the modern Republic of Lebanon and the earlier emergence of Greater Lebanon under the French Mandate for Syria and the Lebanon, as well as the previous history of the region, covered by the modern state.

The modern State of Lebanon has existed within its current borders since 1920, when Greater Lebanon was created under French and British mandate, resulting from the dismemberment of the Ottoman Empire at the end of World War I. Before this date, the designation "Lebanon" concerned a territory with vaguely defined borders, encompassing the mountain range of Mount Lebanon and its outskirts (mainly the Mediterranean coast and the plains of Bekaa and Akkar). The idea of an independent Lebanon, however, emerged during the end of the Mount Lebanon Emirate where Maronite clerics vowed for an independent nation.

== Prehistory ==
Ksar Akil, 10 kilometres (6.2 mi) northeast of Beirut, is a large rock shelter below a steep limestone cliff where excavations have shown occupational deposits reaching down to a depth of 23.6 metres (77 ft) with one of the longest sequences of Paleolithic flint archaeological industry is a very well tained Upper Levalloiso-Mousterian remains with long and triangular lithic flakes. The level above this showed industries accounting for all six stages of the Upper Paleolithic. An Emireh point was found at the first stage of this level (XXIV), at around 15.2 metres (50 ft) below datum with a complete skeleton of an eight-year-old modern human (called Egbert, now in the National Museum of Beirut after being studied in America) was discovered at 11.6 metres (38 ft), cemented into breccia. A fragment of a Neanderthal maxilla was also discovered in material from level XXVI or XXV, at around 15 metres (49 ft). Studies by Hooijer showed wild goat and fallow deer were dominant in the fauna along with the extinct narrow-nosed rhinoceros in later Levalloiso-Mousterian levels.

It is believed to be one of the earliest known sites containing Upper Paleolithic technologies. Artifacts recovered from the site include Ksar Akil flakes, the main type of tool found at the site, along with shells with holes and chipped edge modifications that are suggested to have been used as pendants or beads. These indicate that the inhabitants were among the first in Western Eurasia to use personal ornaments. Results from radiocarbon dating indicate that the early humans may have lived at the site approximately 45,000 years ago or earlier. The presence of personal ornaments at Ksar Akil is suggestive of modern human behavior. The findings of ornaments at the site are contemporaneous with ornaments found at Late Stone Age sites such as Enkapune Ya Muto.

== Ancient Near East ==
The earliest prehistoric cultures of Lebanon, such as the Qaraoun culture gave rise to the civilization of the Canaanite period, when the region was populated by ancient peoples, cultivating land and living in sophisticated societies during the 2nd millennium BC. Northern Canaanites are mentioned in the Bible as well as in other Semitic records from that period.

Canaanites were the creators of the oldest known 24-letter alphabet, a shortening of earlier 30-letter alphabets such as Proto-Sinaitic and Ugaritic. The Canaanite alphabet later developed into the Phoenician one (with sister alphabets of Hebrew, Aramaic and Moabite), influencing the writing systems of the entire Mediterranean region, and ultimately much of Africa, Asia, and Europe.

The coastal plain of Lebanon is the historic home of a string of coastal trading cities of Semitic culture, which the Greeks termed Phoenicia, whose maritime culture flourished there for more than 1,000 years. Ancient ruins in Byblos, Berytus (Beirut), Sidon, Sarepta (Sarafand), and Tyre show a civilized nation, with urban centres and sophisticated arts.

Phoenicia was a cosmopolitan centre for many nations and cultures. Phoenician art, customs and religion reveal considerable Mesopotamian and Egyptian influence. The sarcophagi of Sidonian kings Eshmunazzar II and Tabnit reveal that Phoenician royalty adopted Egyptian burial customs.

Phoenician traders exported spices from Arabia, such as cinnamon and frankincense, to the Greeks. This trade likely led to the transmission of the Phoenician alphabet to Greece. Herodotus attests that the Phoenicians

"introduced into Greece upon their arrival a great variety of arts, among the rest that of writing, whereof the Greeks till then had, as I think, been ignorant."

According to legend however, it is Cadmus, Prince of Tyre, who brought the alphabet with him to Greece in his search for his abducted sister Europa. Cadmus ultimately settles in Greece and founds the city of Thebes. Ancient Greek history accepts the Phoenician origin of the Greek alphabet. According to Herodotus,

"[the Greeks] originally they shaped their letters exactly like all the other Phoenicians, but afterwards, in course of time, they changed by degrees their language, and together with it the form likewise of their characters."

Herodotus attests the persistence of traces of the Phoenician alphabet in Greece on tripods in Delphi in what is now known as the 5th century BC. The Phoenicians were equally reputed for their seafaring skills. They were allegedly the first to circumnavigate the African continent. Herodotus writes that Egyptian Pharaoh Necos,

"[...] sent to sea a number of ships manned by Phoenicians, with orders to make for the Pillars of Hercules [the Strait of Gibraltar], and return to Egypt through them, and by the Mediterranean. The Phoenicians took their departure from Egypt by way of the Erythraean sea [the Red Sea], and so sailed into the southern ocean. When autumn came, they went ashore, wherever they might happen to be, and having sown a tract of land with corn, waited until the grain was fit to cut. Having reaped it, they again set sail; and thus it came to pass that two whole years went by, and it was not till the third year that they doubled the Pillars of Hercules, and made good their voyage home. On their return, they declared — I for my part do not believe them, but perhaps others may - that in sailing round Libya [i.e., Africa] they had the sun upon their right hand. In this way was the extent of Libya first discovered."

The last phrase is usually regarded by modern historians as lending credibility to the Phoenician narrative, as they could not have otherwise known that the sun would be on their right hand side as they sailed southwards below the Equator line.

The Phoenicians founded various colonies in the Mediterranean. The most famous of them are Carthage in today's Tunisia, Tripoli in today's Libya, Gadir (Cadiz) and Barcelona in today's Spain, Palermo in today's Italy, Lisbon in today's Portugal.

Phoenicia maintained an uneasy tributary relationship with the neo-Assyrian and neo-Babylonian empires during the 9th to 6th centuries BC.

== Classical Antiquity ==
After the gradual decline of their strength, the Phoenician city-states on the Lebanese coast were conquered outright in 539 BC by Achaemenid Persia under Cyrus the Great. Under Darius I, the area comprising Phoenicia, Canaan, Syria, and Cyprus was administered in a single satrapy and paid a yearly tribute of three hundred and fifty talents. By comparison, Egypt and Libya paid seven hundred talents. Many Phoenician colonies continued their independent existence—most notably Carthage. The Persians forced some of the population to migrate to Carthage, which remained a powerful nation until the Second Punic War.

The Phoenicians of Tyre showed greater solidarity with their former colony Carthage than loyalty towards Persian king Cambyses, by refusing to sail against the former when ordered.

The Phoenicians furnished the bulk of the Persian fleet during the Greco-Persian Wars. Herodotus considers them as "the best sailors" in the Persian fleet. Phoenicians under Xerxes I were equally commended for their ingenuity in building the Xerxes Canal. Nevertheless, they were harshly punished by the Persian king following the Battle of Salamis, which culminated in a defeat for the Achaemenid Empire.

In 350 or 345 BC, a rebellion in Sidon led by Tennes was crushed by Artaxerxes III. Its destruction was described by Diodorus Siculus.

After two centuries of Persian rule, the Macedonian ruler Alexander the Great, during his war against Persia, attacked and burned Tyre, the most prominent Phoenician city. He conquered what is now Lebanon and other nearby regions in 332 BC. After Alexander's death the region was absorbed into the Seleucid Empire and became known as Coele-Syria.

In 64 BC, the region was conquered by a Roman army under general Pompey and became a part of the Roman state. Christianity was introduced to the coastal plain of Lebanon from neighboring Galilee, already in the 1st century. The region, as with the rest of Syria and much of Anatolia, became a major center of Christianity. Mount Lebanon and its coastal plain became part of the Diocese of the East, divided to provinces of Phoenice Paralia and Phoenice Libanensis (which also extended over large parts of modern Syria).

During the late 4th and early 5th centuries in Lebanon, a hermit named Maron established a monastic tradition, focused on the importance of monotheism and asceticism, near the mountain range of Mount Lebanon. The monks who followed Maron spread his teachings among the native Lebanese Christians and remaining pagans in the mountains and coast of Lebanon. These Lebanese Christians came to be known as Maronites, and moved into the mountains to avoid religious persecution by Roman authorities. During the frequent Roman–Persian Wars that lasted for many centuries, the Sassanid Persians occupied what is now Lebanon from 619 to 629.

== Middle Ages ==
=== Islamic rule ===
During the 7th century AD the Muslim Arabs conquered Syria soon after the death of Muhammad, establishing a new regime to replace the Romans (or Byzantines as the Eastern Romans are sometimes called). Though Islam and the Arabic language were officially dominant under this new regime, the general populace still took time to convert from Christianity and the Syriac language. In particular, the Maronite community clung to its faith and managed to maintain a large degree of autonomy despite the succession of rulers over Syria. Muslim influence increased greatly in the seventh century, when the nearby city Damascus, in modern-day Syria, was set as the capital of the Umayyad Caliphate.

During the reign of Uthman, who ruled the Rashidun Caliphate between 644 and 656, Islam gained prominence in Damascus, primarily due to Mu'awiya, a relative of Uthman who served as the governor. Mu'awiya deployed forces to Lebanon's coastal region, where he expanded Islamic influence, resulting in conversions to Islam among the coastal residents. However, in the mountainous areas, the local population retained their Christian or other cultural traditions. Moreover, both Christians and Jews were obliged to pay the jizya, or poll tax, to Islamic rulers. The collection of this tax from mountain Christians saw inconsistent enforcement until the First Crusade, where it ceased under Latin rule. A revival occurred under the Mamluks, concluding with its abolition through an Ottoman edict in 1856.

After the Islamic conquest, Mediterranean trade faced a prolonged decline lasting three centuries, attributed to maritime conflicts between the Islamic caliphate and the Byzantines. The partially damaged ports, vital as naval strongholds for the caliphate, struggled to regain prosperity. Despite attempts involving military presence and new settlers, the cities of Tyre, Sidon, Beirut, and Tripoli likely sustained populations of only a few thousand each during the Umayyad and Abbasid periods.

By 758, the Abbasid Caliph al-Mansur tasked the Arab Tanukhids with the defense of the hills around Beirut. In 845, tensions flared as Tanukhs clashed with Christians in Kisrawan.

In the 980s, the Fatimid Caliphate gained dominance over Mount Lebanon. Under Fatimid rule, the region experienced a renaissance in Mediterranean trade along the Lebanese coast, stimulated by commercial connections with Byzantium and Italy. Consequently, Tripoli and Tyre thrived well into the 11th century, specializing in the export of products like cotton and silk textiles, sugar, and glassware.

In the 1020s, the Druze sect began to diverge from Isma’ili Shia Islam. Tanukhid chiefs embraced the "Call," acknowledging Fatimid Caliph Al-Hakim bi-Amr Allah as divine, thereby establishing the foundation of the sect in Mount Lebanon. The new faith gained followers in the southern portion of Lebanon.

=== Crusader kingdoms ===
Following the fall of Roman/Christian Anatolia to the Muslim Turks of the Seljuk Empire in the 11th century, the Romans in Constantinople appealed to the Pope in Rome for assistance. There resulted a series of wars known as the Crusades, launched by Latin Christians (of mainly French origin) in Western Europe to reclaim the former Roman territories in the Eastern Mediterranean, especially Syria and Palestine (the Levant). Lebanon stood in the main path of the First Crusade's advance on Jerusalem from Anatolia. Frankish nobles occupied areas within present-day Lebanon as part of the southeastern Crusader States. The southern half of present-day Lebanon formed the northern march of the Kingdom of Jerusalem (founded in 1099); the northern half became the heartland of the County of Tripoli (founded in 1109). Although Saladin eliminated Christian control of the Holy Land around 1190, the Crusader states in Lebanon and Syria were better defended.

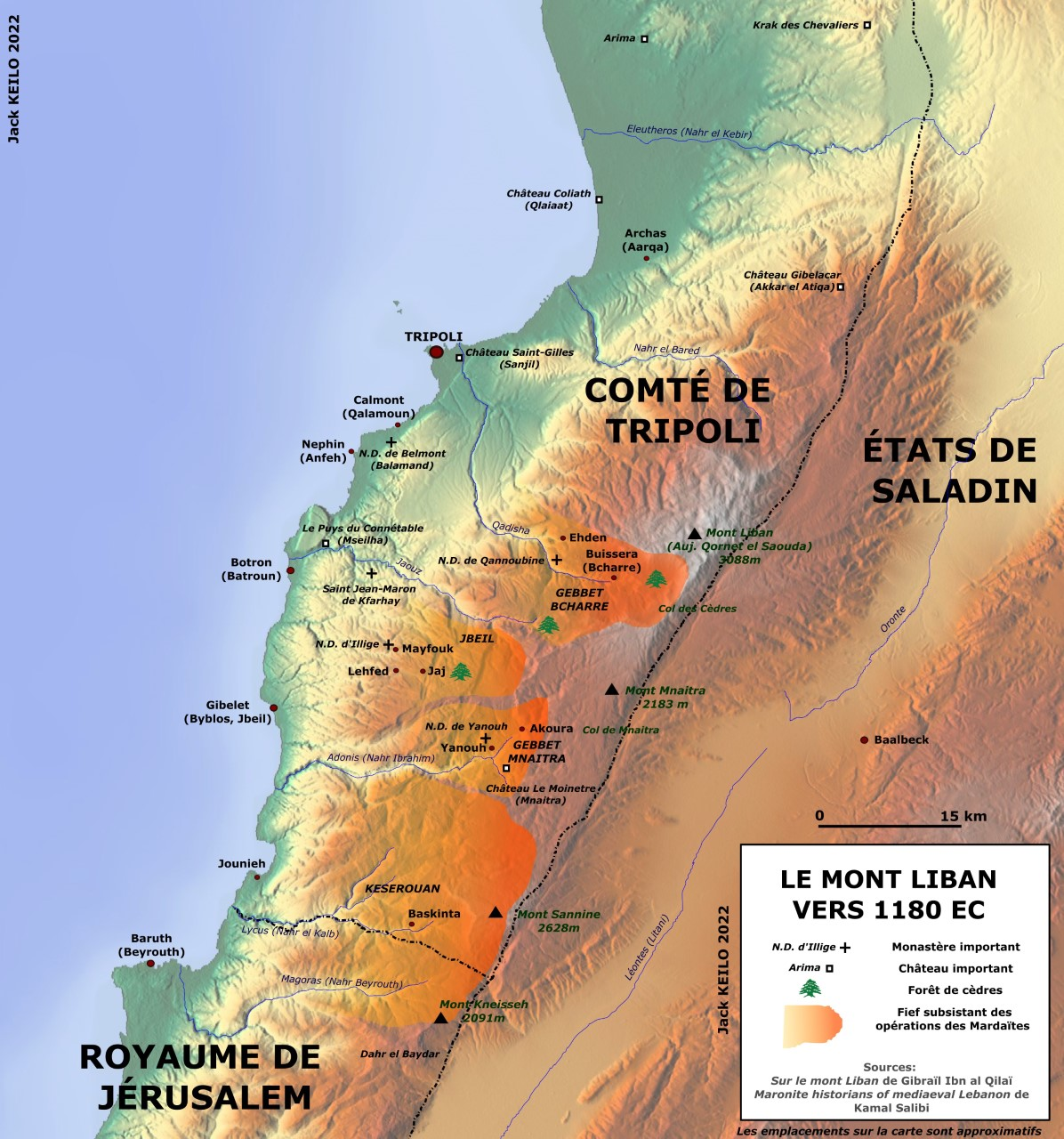
A map of Mount Lebanon c. AD 1180

One of the most lasting effects of the Crusades in this region was the contact between the crusaders (mainly French) and the Maronites. Unlike most other Christian communities in the region, who swore allegiance to Constantinople or other local patriarchs, the Maronites proclaimed allegiance to the Pope in Rome. As such the Franks saw them as Roman Catholic brethren. These initial contacts led to centuries of support for the Maronites from France and Italy, even after the later fall of the Crusader states in the region.

=== Mamluk rule ===
Muslim control of Lebanon was reestablished in the late 13th century under the Mamluk sultans of Egypt, who reinstated Sunni Islamic dominance. Initially sacking Crusader towns and punishing perceived infidels and heretics in the mountains, the Mamluks later became more discerning in their actions. They demolished less fortified ports south of Sidon, and reconstructed Sidon, Beirut, and Tripoli. This resulted in the decline of Tyre while propelling Tripoli to prominence as the region's foremost port town. Now a provincial capital, Tripoli evolved into a center for Sunni religious education and became the primary hub for long-distance trade in Syria. The Mamluks also invested in Baalbek as an inland center.

Despite facing the devastating impact of the Black Death in 1348–1349, which reduced the population by a third and curtailed economic activity for over two centuries, the Mamluks contributed to the enduring architectural legacy of the region, including the restoration of the Crusader Citadel of Tripoli and the construction of stone buildings and mosques.

== Ottoman rule ==
Starting from the 16th century, the Ottoman Turks formed an empire which came to encompass the Balkans, Middle East and North Africa. The Ottoman sultan Selim I (1516–20), after defeating the Persians, conquered the Mamluks. His troops, invading Syria, destroyed Mamluk resistance in 1516 at Marj Dabiq, north of Aleppo.

Ottoman control was uncontested during the early modern period, but the Lebanese coast became important for its contacts and trades with the maritime republics of Venice, Genoa other Italian city-states. (See also Levantines)

The mountainous territory of Mount Lebanon has long been a shelter for minority and persecuted groups, including its historic Maronite Christian majority and Druze communities. It was an autonomous region of the Ottoman Empire.

During the conflict between the Mamluks and the Ottomans, the amirs of Lebanon linked their fate to that of Ghazali, governor (pasha) of Damascus. He won the confidence of the Ottomans by fighting on their side at Marj Dabiq and, apparently pleased with the behavior of the Lebanese amirs, introduced them to Salim I when he entered Damascus. Salim I decided to grant the Lebanese amirs a semiautonomous status. The Ottomans, through the two main feudal families, the Maans who were Druze and the Chehabs who were Sunni Muslim Arab converts to Maronite Christianity, ruled Lebanon until the middle of the nineteenth century. During Ottoman rule the term Syria was used to designate the approximate area including present-day Lebanon, Syria, Jordan, and Israel/Palestine.

=== Maans dynasty (1517–1697) ===
The Maans came to Lebanon in 1120. They were a tribe and dynasty of Qahtani Arabs who settled on the southwestern slopes of the Lebanon Mountains and soon adopted the Druze religion. Their authority began to rise with Fakhr ad-Din I, who was permitted by Ottoman authorities to organize his own army, and reached its peak with Fakhr ad-Din II (1570–1635). (The existence of "Fakhr ad-Din I" has been questioned by some scholars.)

==== Fakhreddine II ====
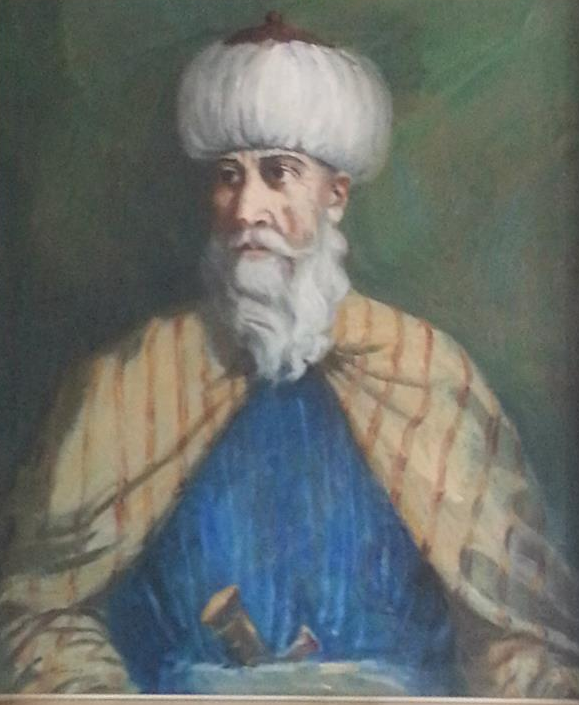
Fakhreddine II

Fakhr al-Din II was born in Baakline to a Druze family, his father died when he was 13, and his mother entrusted her son to another princely family, the Maronite Khazens. In 1608, Fakhr-al-Din forged an alliance with the Italian Grand Duchy of Tuscany. The alliance contained both a public economic section and a secret military one. Fakhr-al-Din's ambitions, popularity and unauthorized foreign contacts alarmed the Ottomans who authorized Hafiz Ahmed Pasha, Muhafiz of Damascus, to mount an attack on Lebanon in 1613 in order to reduce Fakhr-al-Din's growing power.

Faced with Hafiz's army of 50,000 men, Fakhr-al-Din chose exile in Tuscany, leaving affairs in the hands of his brother Emir Yunis and his son Emir Ali Beg. They succeeded in mainlining most of the forts such as Banias (Subayba) and Niha which were a mainstay of Fakhr ad-Din's power. Before leaving, Fakhr ad-Din paid his standing army of soqbans (mercenaries) two years wages in order to secure their loyalty.

Hosted in Tuscany by the Medici Family, Fakhr-al-Din was welcomed by the grand duke Cosimo II, who was his host and sponsor for the two years he spent at the court of the Medici. He spent a further three years as guest of the Spanish Viceroy of Sicily and then Naples, the Duke Osuna. Fakhr-al-Din had wished to enlist Tuscan or other European assistance in a "Crusade" to free his homeland from Ottoman domination, but was met with a refusal as Tuscany was unable to afford such an expedition. The prince eventually gave up the idea, realizing that Europe was more interested in trade with the Ottomans than in taking back the Holy Land. His stay nevertheless allowed him to witness Europe's cultural revival in the 17th century, and bring back some Renaissance ideas and architectural features.

By 1618, political changes in the Ottoman sultanate had resulted in the removal of many of Fakhr-al-Din's enemies from power, allowing Fahkr-al-Din's return to Lebanon, whereupon he was able quickly to reunite all the lands of Lebanon beyond the boundaries of its mountains; and having revenge from Emir Yusuf Pasha ibn Siyfa, attacking his stronghold in Akkar, destroying his palaces and taking control of his lands, and regaining the territories he had to give up in 1613 in Sidon, Tripoli, Bekaa among others. Under his rule, printing presses were introduced and Jesuit priests and Catholic nuns encouraged to open schools throughout the land.

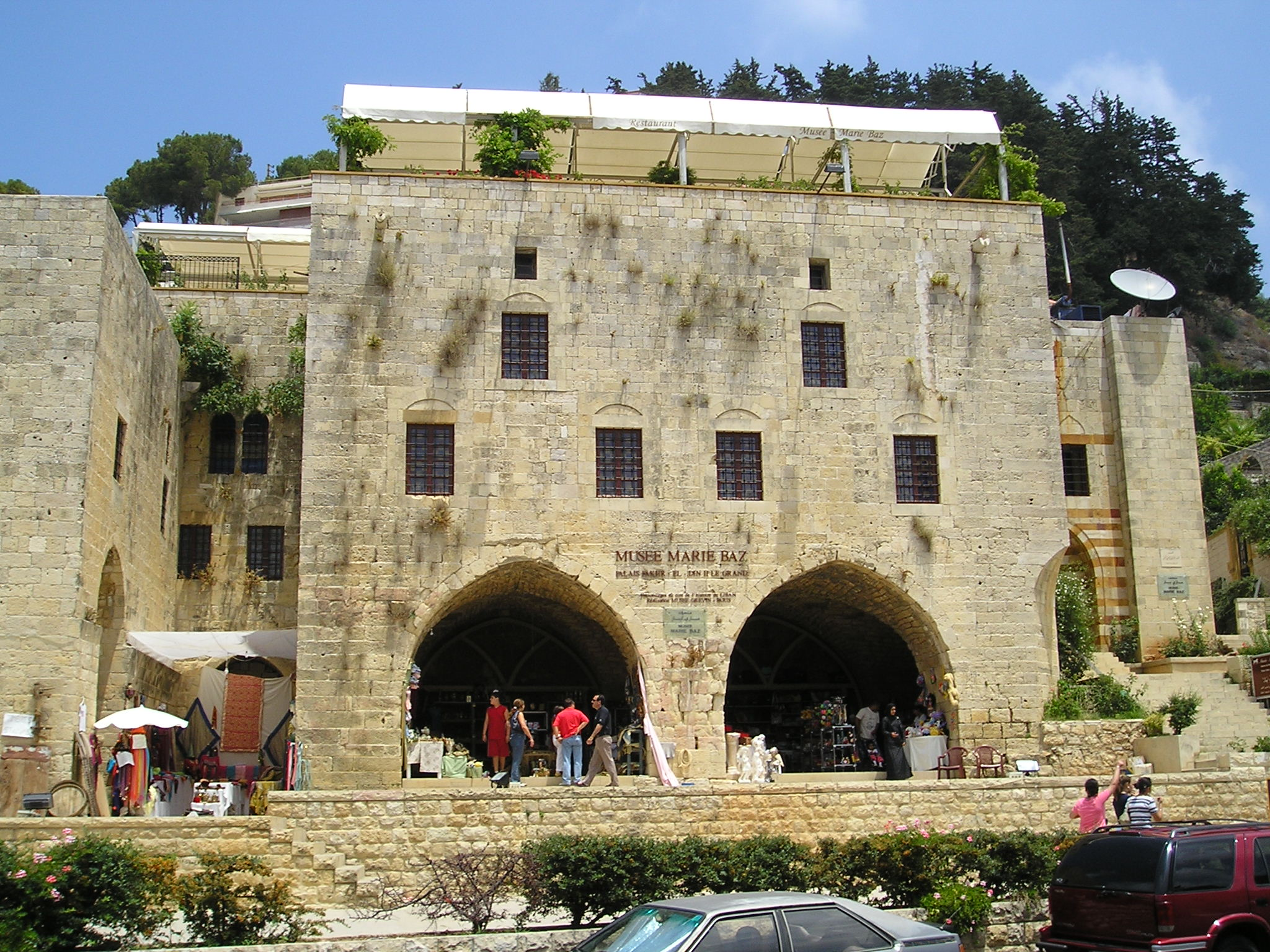
Fakhreddine II Palace in Deir el Qamar

In 1623, the prince angered the Ottomans by refusing to allow an army on its way back from the Persian front to winter in the Bekaa. This (and instigation by the powerful Janissary garrison in Damascus) led Mustafa Pasha, Governor of Damascus, to launch an attack against him, resulting in the battle at Majdel Anjar where Fakhr-al-Din's forces although outnumbered managed to capture the Pasha and secure the Lebanese prince and his allies a much needed military victory. The best source (in Arabic) for Fakhr ad-Din's career up to this point is a memoir signed by al-Khalidi as-Safadi, who was not with the Emir in Europe but had access to someone who was, possibly Fakhr ad-Din himself. However, as time passed, the Ottomans grew increasingly uncomfortable with the prince's increasing powers and extended relations with Europe. In 1632, Kuchuk Ahmed Pasha was named Muhafiz of Damascus, being a rival of Fakhr-al-Din and a friend of Sultan Murad IV, who ordered Kuchuk Ahmed Pasha and the sultanate's navy to attack Lebanon and depose Fakhr-al-Din.

This time, the prince had decided to remain in Lebanon and resist the offensive, but the death of his son Emir Ali Beik in Wadi el-Taym was the beginning of his defeat. He later took refuge in Jezzine's grotto, closely followed by Kuchuk Ahmed Pasha. He surrendered to the Ottoman general Jaafar Pasha, whom he knew well, under circumstances that are not clear.

Fakhr-al-Din was taken to Constantinople and kept in the Yedikule prison for two years. He was then summoned before the sultan. Fakhr-al-Din, and one or two of his sons, were accused of treason and executed there on 13 April 1635. There are unsubstantiated rumors that the younger of the two boys was spared and raised in the harem, later becoming Ottoman ambassador to India.

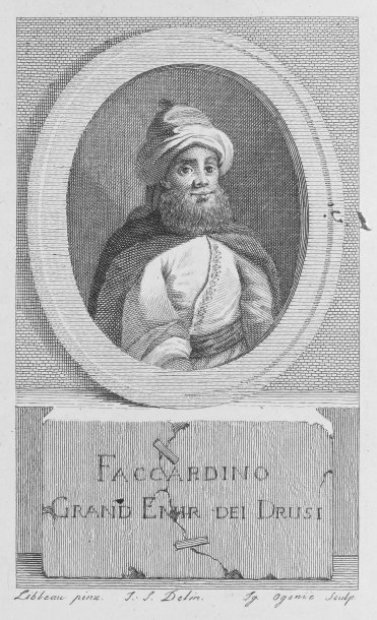
Portrait of Fakhreddine while he was in Tuscany, stating "Faccardino grand emir dei Drusi" translated as "Fakhreddine: great emir of the Druze"

Although Fakhr ad-Din II's aspirations toward complete independence for Lebanon ended tragically, he greatly enhanced Lebanon's military and economic development. Noted for religious tolerance, the prince attempted to merge the country's different religious groups into one Lebanese community. In an effort to attain complete independence for Lebanon, he concluded a secret agreement with Ferdinand I, grand duke of Tuscany.

Following his return from Tuscany, Fakhr ad-Din II, realizing the need for a strong and disciplined armed force, channeled his financial resources into building a regular army. This army proved itself in 1623, when Mustafa Pasha, the new governor of Damascus, underestimating the capabilities of the Lebanese army, engaged it in battle and was decisively defeated at Anjar in the Beqaa Valley.

In addition to building up the army, Fakhr ad-Din II, who became acquainted with Italian culture during his stay in Tuscany, initiated measures to modernize the country. After forming close ties and establishing diplomatic relations with Tuscany, he brought in architects, irrigation engineers, and agricultural experts from Italy in an effort to promote prosperity in the country. He also strengthened Lebanon's strategic position by expanding its territory, building forts as far away as Palmyra in Syria, and gaining control of Palestine. Finally, the Ottoman sultan Murad IV of Istanbul, wanting to thwart Lebanon's progress toward complete independence, ordered Kutshuk, then governor of Damascus, to attack the Lebanese ruler. This time Fakhr ad-Din was defeated, and he was executed in Istanbul in 1635. No significant Maan rulers succeeded Fakhr ad-Din II.

Fakhreddine is regarded as one of the most prominent rulers in Lebanese history. During his reign, the territories under his control experienced significant political, economic, and territorial expansion.

=== Shihab dynasty (1697–1842) ===
The Shihabs succeeded the Maans in 1697 after the Battle of Ain Dara, a battle that changed the face of Lebanon when a clash between two Arab clans, the Qaysis and the Yemenis, broke out. The Qaysis, then led by Ahmad Shihab, won, and expelled the Yemenis from Lebanon to Syria. This has led to an enormous decrease to the Druze population in Mount-Lebanon, who were a majority at the time and helped the Christians overcome the Druze demographically. This Qaysi "victory" allowed the Shihab, who were Qaysis themselves and the allies of Lebanon, to rule over Mount-Lebanon. The Shihabs originally lived in the Hawran region of southwestern Syria and settled in Wadi al-Taym in southern Lebanon.

During the Russo-Turkish War of 1768 to 1774, responding to Admiral Alexei Orlov's Russian naval First Archipelago Expedition operating in the Mediterranean, local Lebanese authorities briefly attempted to place themselves under Russian protection.

The most prominent Shihab, Bashir Shihab II, ruled as Emir of Mount Lebanon from 1789 to 1840. The events of 1799 tested his ability as a statesman when Napoleon besieged Acre, a well-fortified coastal city in Palestine, about forty kilometers south of Tyre. Both Napoleon and Al Jazzar, the governor of Acre, requested assistance from the Shihab leader; Bashir, however, remained neutral, declining to assist either combatant. Unable to conquer Acre, Napoleon returned to Egypt, and the death of Al Jazzar in 1804 removed Bashir's principal opponent in the area.

The Shihabs were originally a Sunni Muslim family, but converted to Christianity in the late-18th century.

==== Emir Bashir II ====
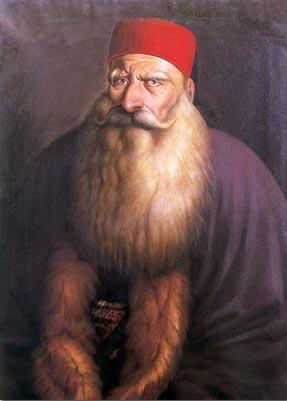
Bashir Shihab II

In 1788 Bashir Shihab II (or Bachir in French sources) would rise to become the Emir. Born into poverty, he was elected emir upon the abdication of his predecessor, and would rule under Ottoman suzerainty, being appointed wali or governor of Mt Lebanon, the Beqaa valley and Jabal Amil. Together this is about two thirds of modern-day Lebanon. He would reform taxes and attempt to break the feudal system, in order to undercut rivals, the most important of which was also named Bashir: Bashir Jumblatt, whose wealth and feudal backers equaled or exceeded Bashir II—and who had increasing support in the Druze community. In 1822 the Ottoman wali of Damascus went to war with Acre, which was allied with Muhammad Ali, the pasha of Egypt. As part of this conflict one of the most remembered massacres of Maronite Christians by Druze forces occurred, forces that were aligned with the wali of Damascus. Jumblatt represented the increasingly disaffected Druze, who were both shut out from official power and angered at the growing ties with the Maronites by Bashir II, who was himself a Maronite Christian.

Bashir II was overthrown as wali when he backed Acre, and fled to Egypt, later to return and organize an army. Jumblatt gathered the Druze factions together, and the war became sectarian in character: the Maronites backing Bashir II, the Druze backing Bashir Jumblatt. Jumblatt declared a rebellion, and between 1821 and 1825 there were massacres and battles, with the Maronites attempting to gain control of the Mt. Lebanon district, and the Druze gaining control over the Beqaa valley. In 1825 Bashir II, helped by the Ottomans and the Jezzar, defeated his rival in the Battle of Simqanieh. Bashir Jumblatt died in Acre at the order of the Jezzar. Bashir II was not a forgiving man and repressed the Druze rebellion, particularly in and around Beirut. This made Bashir Chehab the only leader of Mount Lebanon. However, Bashir Chehab was depicted as a nasty leader because Bashir Jumblatt was his all-time friend and has saved his life when the Keserwan peasants tried to kill the prince, by sending 1000 of his men to save him. Also, days before the Battle of Simqania, Bashir Jumblatt had the chance to kill Bashir II when he was returning from Acre when he reportedly kissed the Jezzar's feet in order to help him against Jumblatt, but Bashir II reminded him of their friendship and told Jumblatt to "pardon when you can". The high morals of Jumblatt led him to pardon Bashir II, a decision he should have regretted.

Bashir II, who had come to power through local politics and nearly fallen from power because of his increasing detachment from them, reached out for allies, allies who looked on the entire area as "the Orient" and who could provide trade, weapons and money, without requiring fealty and without, it seemed, being drawn into endless internal squabbles. He disarmed the Druze and allied with France, governing in the name of the Egyptian Pasha Muhammad Ali, who entered Lebanon and formally took overlordship in 1832. For the remaining 8 years, the sectarian and feudal rifts of the 1821–1825 conflict were heightened by the increasing economic isolation of the Druze, and the increasing wealth of the Maronites.

During the nineteenth century the town of Beirut became the most important port of the region, supplanting Acre further to the south. This was mostly because Mount Lebanon became a centre of silk production for export to Europe. This industry made the region wealthy, but also dependent on links to Europe. Since most of the silk went to Marseille, the French began to have a great impact in the region.

=== Sectarian conflict: European powers begin to intervene ===
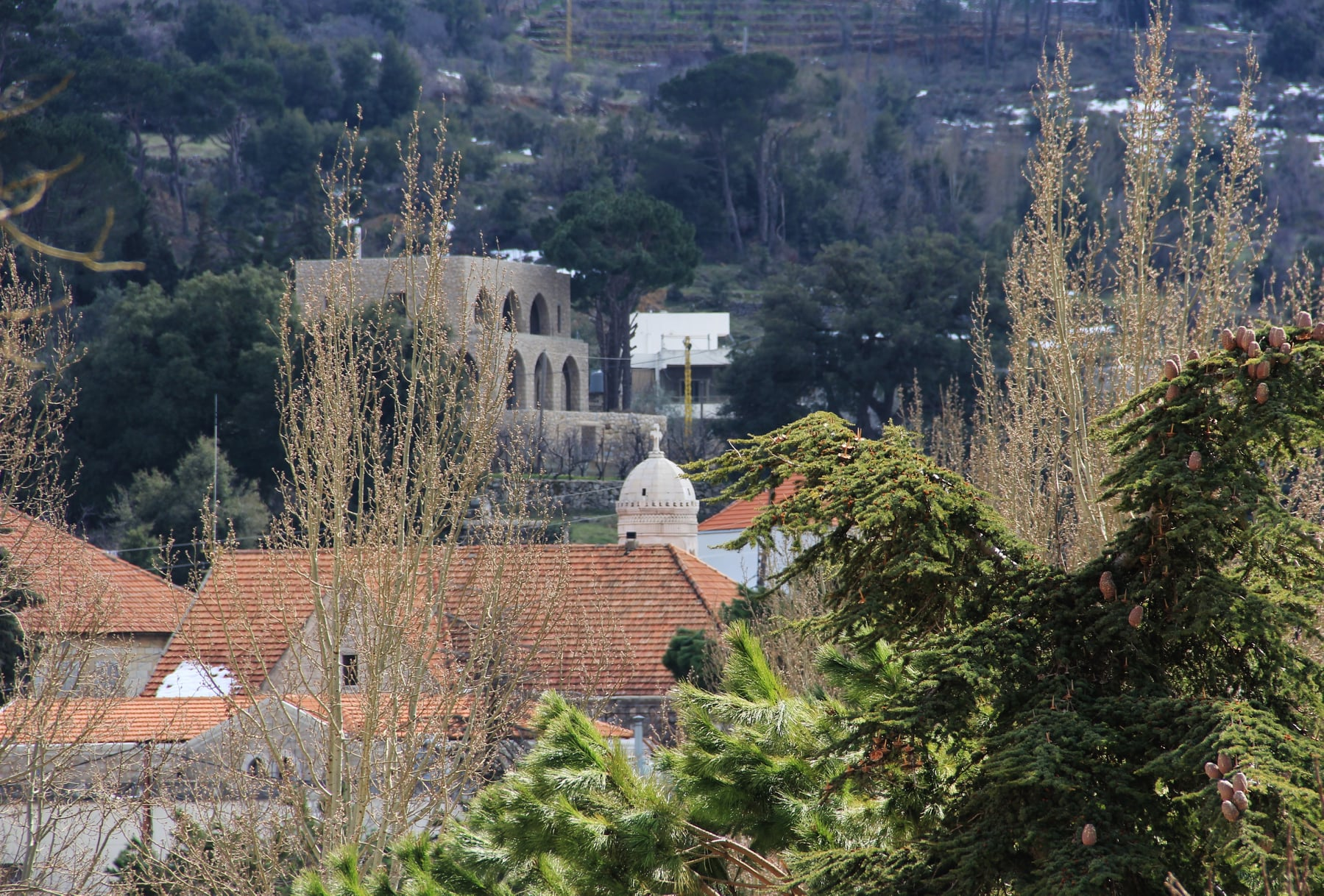
Christian Church and Druze Khalwa in Shuf Mountains: Historically; the Druzes and the Christians in the Shuf Mountains lived in complete harmony.

The discontent grew to open rebellion, fed by both Ottoman and British money and support: Bashir II fled, the Ottoman Empire reasserted control and Mehmed Hüsrev Pasha, whose sole term as Grand Vizier ran from 1839 to 1841, appointed another member of the Shihab family, who styled himself Bashir III. Bashir III, coming on the heels of a man who by guile, force and diplomacy had dominated Mt Lebanon and the Beqaa for 52 years, did not last long. In 1841 conflicts between the impoverished Druze and the Maronite Christians exploded: There was a massacre of Christians by the Druze at Deir al Qamar, and the fleeing survivors were slaughtered by Ottoman regulars. The Ottomans attempted to create peace by dividing Mt Lebanon into a Christian district and a Druze district, but this would merely create geographic powerbases for the warring parties, and it plunged the region back into civil conflict which included not only the sectarian warfare but a Maronite revolt against the Feudal class, which ended in 1858 with the overthrow of the old feudal system of taxes and levies. The situation was unstable: the Maronites lived in the large towns, but these were often surrounded by Druze villages living as perioikoi.

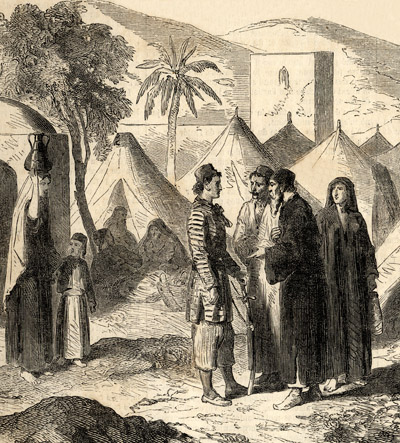
Christian refugees during the 1860 strife between Druze and Maronites in Lebanon

The relationship between the Druze and Christians has been characterized by harmony and peaceful coexistence, with amicable relations between the two groups prevailing throughout history, with the exception of some periods, including 1860 Mount Lebanon civil war. In 1860, this would boil back into full scale sectarian war, when the Maronites began openly opposing the power of the Ottoman Empire. Another destabilizing factor was France's support for the Maronite Christians against the Druze which in turn led the British to back the Druze, exacerbating religious and economic tensions between the two communities. The Druze took advantage of this and began burning Maronite villages. The Druze had grown increasingly resentful of the favoring of the Maronites by Bashir II, and were backed by the Ottoman Empire and the wali of Damascus in an attempt to gain greater control over Lebanon; the Maronites were backed by the French, out of both economic and political expediency. The Druze began a military campaign that included the burning of villages and massacres, while Maronite irregulars retaliated with attacks of their own. However, the Maronites were gradually pushed into a few strongholds and were on the verge of military defeat when the Concert of Europe intervened and established a commission to determine the outcome. The French forces deployed there were then used to enforce the final decision. The French accepted the Druze as having established control and the Maronites were reduced to a semi-autonomous region around Mount Lebanon, without even direct control over Beirut itself. The Province of Lebanon would be controlled by the Maronites, but the entire area was placed under direct rule of the governor of Damascus, and carefully watched by the Ottoman Empire.

The long siege of Deir al-Qamar found a Maronite garrison holding out against Druze forces backed by Ottoman soldiers; the area in every direction was despoiled by the besiegers. In July 1860, with European intervention threatening, the Turkish government tried to quiet the strife, but Napoleon III of France sent 7,000 troops to Beirut and helped impose a partition: The Druze control of the territory was recognized as the fact on the ground, and the Maronites were forced into an enclave, arrangements ratified by the Concert of Europe in 1861. They were confined to a mountainous district, cut off from both the Beqaa and Beirut, and faced with the prospect of ever-growing poverty. Resentments and fears would brood, ones which would resurface in the coming decades.

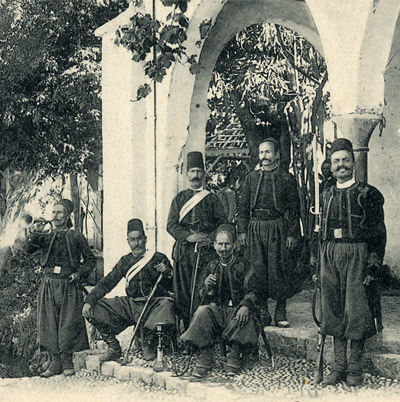
Lebanese soldiers, 1861–1914

Youssef Bey Karam, a Lebanese nationalist played an influential role in Lebanon's independence during this era.

In December 1831 Tyre fell under the rule of Muhammad Ali Pasha of Egypt, after an army led by his son Ibrahim Pasha had entered Jaffa and Haifa without resistance. Two years later, Shiite forces under Hamad al-Mahmud from the Ali al-Saghir dynasty rebelled against the occupation. They were supported by the British Empire and Austria-Hungary: Tyre was captured on 24 September 1839 after allied naval bombardments. For their fight against the Egyptian invaders, al-Mahmud and his successor Ali El-Assaad – a relative – were rewarded by the Ottoman rulers with the restoration of Shiite autonomy in Jabal Amel. However, in Tyre it was the Mamluk family that gained a dominant position. Its head Jussuf Aga ibn Mamluk was reportedly a son of the anti-Shiite Jazzar Pasha.

=== Late 19th century to early 20th century ===
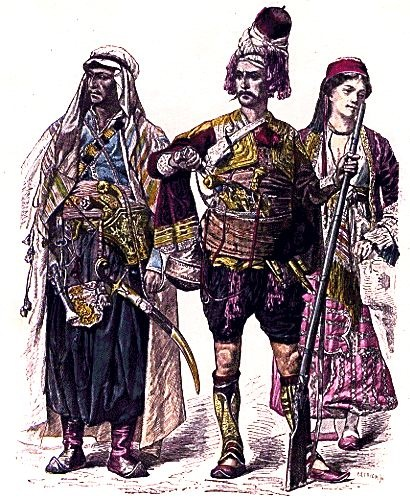
Lebanese dress from the late 19th century.

The Maronite Catholics and the Druze founded modern Lebanon in the early eighteenth century, through the ruling and social system known as the "Maronite-Druze dualism" in Mount Lebanon Mutasarrifate. The remainder of the 19th century saw a relative period of stability, as Muslim, Druze and Maronite groups focused on economic and cultural development which saw the founding of the American University of Beirut and a flowering of literary and political activity associated with the attempts to liberalize the Ottoman Empire. Late in the century there was a short Druze uprising over the extremely harsh government and high taxation rates, but there was far less of the violence that had scalded the area earlier in the century.

In the approach to World War I, Beirut became a center of various reforming movements, and would send delegates to the Arab Syrian conference and Franco-Syrian conference held in Paris. There was a complex array of solutions, from pan-Arab nationalism, to separatism for Beirut, and several status quo movements that sought stability and reform within the context of Ottoman government. The Young Turk revolution brought these movements to the front, hoping that the reform of Ottoman Empire would lead to broader reforms. The outbreak of hostilities changed this, as Lebanon was to feel the weight of the conflict in the Middle East more heavily than most other areas occupied by the Syrians.

==== Great famine in Lebanon, 1915–1918 ====
They lost so many loved ones during that time. My father once said that the rich families survived as they were able to bribe and get supplies on the black market. It was the unemployed, the middle class and the poor that were dying in the streets.

— Teresa Michel, son of famine survivors

About half the population of the Mount Lebanon subdivision, overwhelmingly Maronites, starved to death (200,000 killed out of 400,000 of the total populace) throughout the years of 1915–1918 during what is now known as the Great Famine of Mount Lebanon, as a consequence of a mixed combination of crop failure, punitive governance practices, naval blockade of the coast by the Allies, and an Ottoman military ban on exports from Syria into Lebanon, during World War I. Dead bodies were piled in the streets and starving Lebanese civilians were reported to be eating street animals while some even resorted to cannibalism.

== League of Nations Mandate (1920–1939) ==
Greater Lebanon (green) in the Mandate of Syria

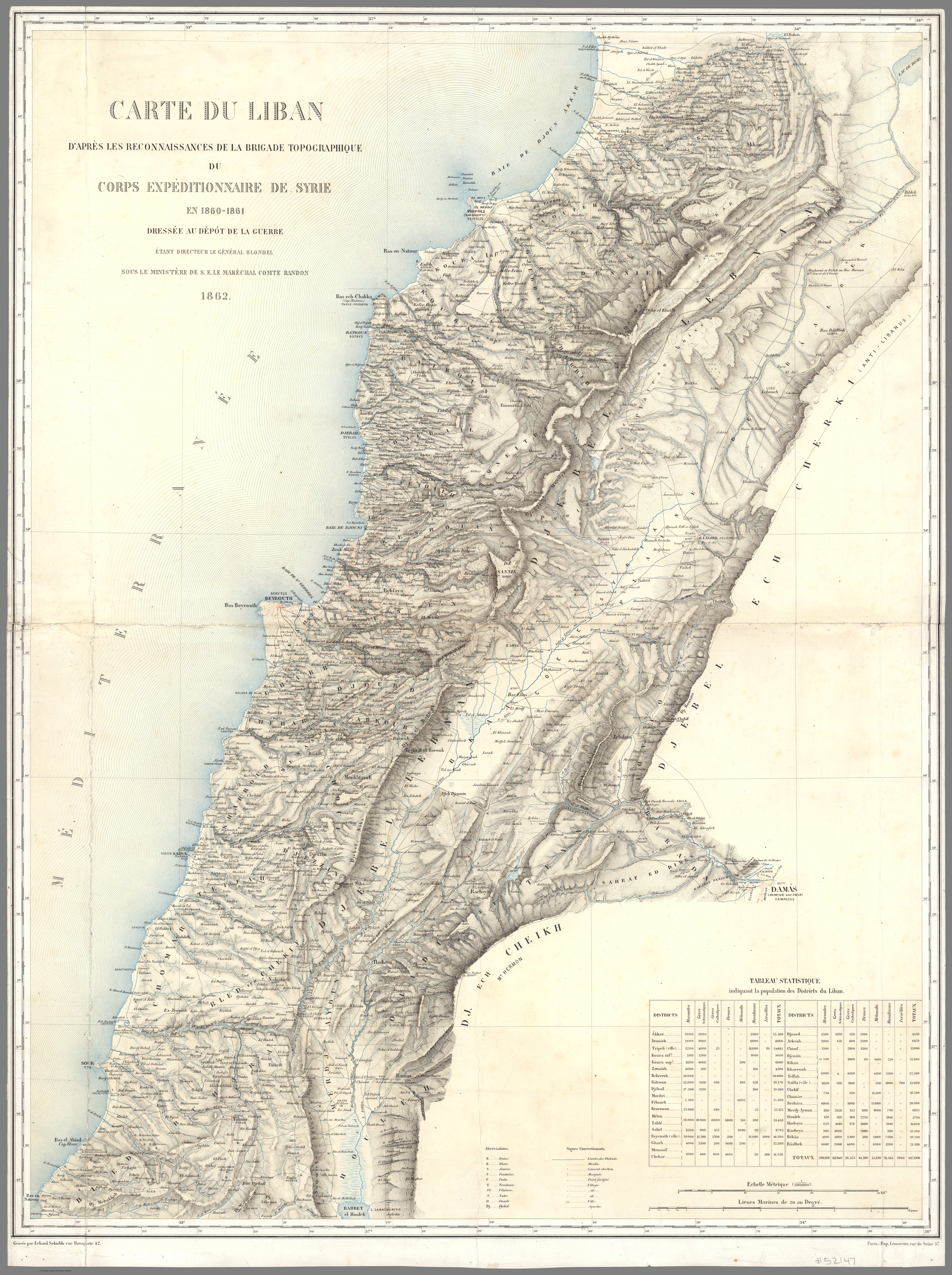
1862 map drawn by the French expedition of Beaufort d'Hautpoul

Black dashed line shows the borders of the 1861–1918 Mount Lebanon Mutasarrifate

The first map, drawn by the French in 1862, was used as a template for the 1920 borders of Greater Lebanon. The second map shows the borders of the 1861–1918 Mount Lebanon Mutasarrifate, overlaid on a map of modern day Lebanon showing religious groups distribution

Following the collapse of the Ottoman Empire after World War I, the League of Nations mandated the five provinces that make up present-day Lebanon to the direct control of France. Initially the division of the Arabic-speaking areas of the Ottoman Empire were to be divided by the Sykes–Picot Agreement; however, the final disposition was at the San Remo conference of 1920, whose determinations on the mandates, their boundaries, purposes and organization was ratified by the League in 1921 and put into effect in 1922.

According to the agreements reached at San Remo, France had its control over what was termed Syria recognised, the French having taken Damascus in 1920. Like all formerly Ottoman areas, Syria was a Class A Mandate, deemed to "... have reached a stage of development where their existence as independent nations can be provisionally recognized subject to the rendering of administrative advice and assistance by a Mandatory until such time as they are able to stand alone. The wishes of these communities must be a principal consideration in the selection of the Mandatory." The entire French mandate area was termed "Syria" at the time, including the administrative districts along the Mediterranean coast. Wanting to maximize the area under its direct control, contain an Arab Syria centered on Damascus, and ensure a defensible border, France moved the Lebanon-Syrian border to the Anti-Lebanon Mountains, east of the Beqaa Valley, territory which had historically belonged to the province of Damascus for hundreds of years, and was far more attached to Damascus than Beirut by culture and influence. This doubled the territory under the control of Beirut, at the expense of what would become the state of Syria.

Flag of Greater Lebanon during the French mandate (1920–1943)

On 27 October 1919, the Lebanese delegation led by Maronite Patriarch Elias Peter Hoayek presented the Lebanese aspirations in a memorandum to the Paris Peace Conference. This included a significant extension of the frontiers of the Lebanon Mutasarrifate, arguing that the additional areas constituted natural parts of Lebanon, despite the fact that the Christian community would not be a clear majority in such an enlarged state. The quest for the annexation of agricultural lands in the Bekaa and Akkar was fueled by existential fears following the death of nearly half of the Mount Lebanon Mutasarrifate population in the Great Famine; the Maronite church and the secular leaders sought a state that could better provide for its people. The areas to be added to the Mutasarrifate included the coastal towns of Beirut, Tripoli, Sidon and Tyre and their respective hinterlands, all of which belonged to the Beirut Vilayet, together with four Kazas of the Syria Vilayet (Baalbek, the Bekaa, Rashaya and Hasbaya).

As a consequence of this also, the demographics of Lebanon were profoundly altered, as the added territory contained people who were predominantly Muslim; Lebanese Christians, of which the Maronites were the largest subgrouping, now constituted barely more than 50% of the population, while Sunni Muslims and Shi'ite Muslims saw their numbers increase. Modern Lebanon's constitution, drawn up in 1926, specified a balance of power between the various religious groups. The president was required to be a Christian (in practice, a Maronite), the prime minister a Sunni Muslim. On the basis of the 1932 census, parliament seats were divided according to a six-to-five Christian/Muslim ratio. The constitution gave the president veto power over any legislation approved by parliament, virtually ensuring that the 6:5 ratio would not be revised in case the population distribution changed. By 1960, Muslims were thought to constitute a majority of the population, which contributed to Muslim unrest regarding the political system.

== World War II and independence ==
During World War II when the Vichy government assumed power over French territory in 1940, General Henri Fernand Dentz was appointed as high commissioner of Lebanon. This new turning point led to the resignation of Lebanese president Émile Eddé on 4 April 1941. After five days, Dentz appointed Alfred Naqqache for a presidency period that lasted only three months. The Vichy authorities allowed Nazi Germany to move aircraft and supplies through Syria to Iraq where they were used against British forces. Britain, fearing that Nazi Germany would gain full control of Lebanon and Syria by pressure on the weak Vichy government, sent its army into Syria and Lebanon.

After the fighting ended in Lebanon, General Charles de Gaulle visited the area. Under various political pressures from both inside and outside Lebanon, de Gaulle decided to recognize the independence of Lebanon. On 26 November 1941, General Georges Catroux announced that Lebanon would become independent under the authority of the Free French government.

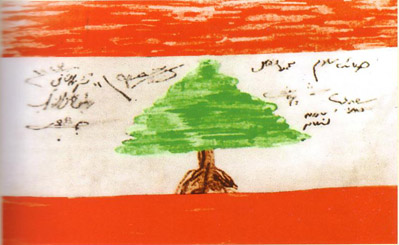
Flag as drawn and approved by the members of the Lebanese parliament during the declaration of independence in 1943

Elections were held in 1943 and on 8 November 1943, the new Lebanese government unilaterally abolished the mandate. The French reacted by throwing the new government into prison. In the face of international pressure, the French released the government officials on 22 November 1943, and accepted the independence of Lebanon.

== Republic of Lebanon ==
=== Independence and following years ===
The allies kept the region under control until the end of World War II. The last French troops withdrew in 1946.

Lebanon's history since independence has been marked by alternating periods of political stability and turmoil interspersed with prosperity built on Beirut's position as a freely trading regional center for finance and trade. Beirut became a prime location for institutions of international commerce and finance, as well as wealthy tourists, and enjoyed a reputation as the "Paris of the Middle East" until the outbreak of the Lebanese Civil War.

In the aftermath of the 1948 Arab–Israeli War, Lebanon became home to more than 110,000 Palestinian refugees.

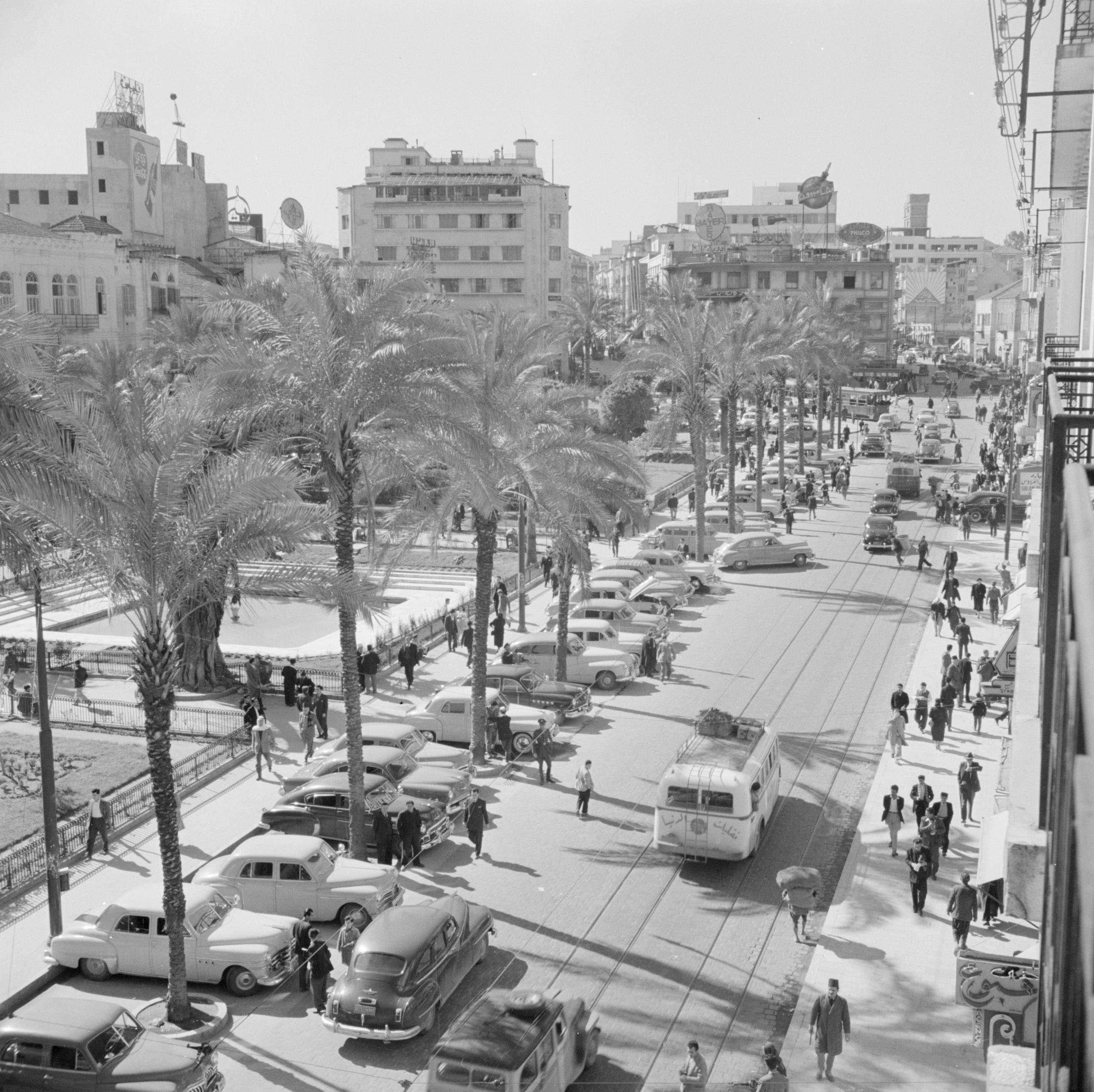
Beirut in 1950

=== Economic prosperity and growing tensions ===
In 1958, during the last months of President Camille Chamoun's term, an insurrection broke out, and 5,000 United States Marines were briefly dispatched to Beirut on 15 July in response to an appeal by the government. After the crisis, a new government was formed, led by the popular former general Fuad Chehab.

During the 1960s, Lebanon enjoyed a period of relative calm, with Beirut-focused tourism and banking sector-driven prosperity. Lebanon reached the peak of its economic success in the mid–1960s—the country was seen as a bastion of economic strength by the oil-rich Persian Gulf Arab states, whose funds made Lebanon one of the world's fastest growing economies. This period of economic stability and prosperity was brought to an abrupt halt with the collapse of Yousef Beidas' Intra Bank, the country's largest bank and financial backbone, in 1966.

Additional Palestinian refugees arrived after the 1967 Arab–Israeli War. Following their defeat in the Jordanian civil war, thousands of Palestinian militiamen regrouped in Lebanon, led by Yasser Arafat's Palestine Liberation Organization, with the intention of replicating the modus operandi of attacking Israel from a politically and militarily weak neighbour. Starting in 1968, Palestinian militants of various affiliations began to use southern Lebanon as a launching pad for attacks on Israel. Two of these attacks led to a watershed event in Lebanon's inchoate civil war. In July 1968, a faction of George Habash's Popular Front for the Liberation of Palestine (PFLP) hijacked an Israeli El Al civilian plane en route to Algiers; in December, two PFLP gunmen shot at an El Al plane in Athens, resulting in the death of an Israeli.

As a result, two days later, an Israeli commando flew into Beirut's international airport and destroyed more than a dozen civilian airliners belonging to various Arab carriers. Israel defended its actions by informing the Lebanese government that it was responsible for encouraging the PFLP. The retaliation, which was intended to encourage a Lebanese government crackdown on Palestinian militants, instead polarized Lebanese society on the Palestinian question, deepening the divide between pro- and anti-Palestinian factions, with the Muslims leading the former grouping and Maronites primarily constituting the latter. This dispute reflected increasing tensions between Christian and Muslim communities over the distribution of political power, and would ultimately foment the outbreak of civil war in 1975.

In the interim, while armed Lebanese forces under the Maronite-controlled government sparred with Palestinian fighters, Egyptian leader Gamal Abd al-Nasser helped to negotiate the 1969 "Cairo Agreement" between Arafat and the Lebanese government, which granted the PLO autonomy over Palestinian refugee camps and access routes to northern Israel in return for PLO recognition of Lebanese sovereignty. The agreement incited Maronite frustration over what were perceived as excessive concessions to the Palestinians, and pro-Maronite paramilitary groups were subsequently formed to fill the vacuum left by government forces, which were now required to leave the Palestinians alone. Notably, the Phalange, a Maronite militia, rose to prominence around this time, led by members of the Gemayel family.

In September 1970 Suleiman Franjieh, who had left the country briefly for Latakia in the 1950s after being accused of killing hundreds of people including other Maronites, was elected president by a very narrow vote in parliament. In November, his personal friend Hafiz al-Assad, who had received him during his exile, seized power in Syria. Later, in 1976, Franjieh would invite the Syrians into Lebanon.

For its part, the PLO used its new privileges to establish an effective "mini-state" in southern Lebanon, and to ramp up its attacks on settlements in northern Israel. Compounding matters, Lebanon received an influx of armed Palestinian militants, including Arafat and his Fatah movement, fleeing the 1970 Jordanian crackdown. The PLO's "vicious terrorist attacks in Israel" dating from this period were countered by Israeli bombing raids in southern Lebanon, where "150 or more towns and villages...have been repeatedly savaged by the Israeli armed forces since 1968," of which the village of Khiyam is probably the best-known example. Palestinian attacks claimed 106 lives in northern Israel from 1967, according to official IDF statistics, while the Lebanese army had recorded "1.4 Israeli violations of Lebanese territory per day from 1968–74" Where Lebanon had no conflict with Israel during the period 1949–1968, after 1968 Lebanon's southern border began to experience an escalating cycle of attack and retaliation, leading to the chaos of the civil war, foreign invasions and international intervention. The consequences of the PLO's arrival in Lebanon continue to this day.

In 1974, the Amal Movement, a Shi’ite political party and former militia was founded by Musa al-Sadr and Hussein el-Husseini. Its goals were geared towards improving the social and political conditions of Lebanon's poor population. Although its primary focus was on the Shi'ite community, the movement operated as a secular entity and enjoyed the support of other communities.

=== The Lebanese Civil War: 1975–1990 ===
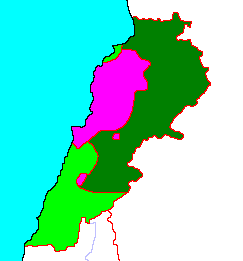
Map showing power balance in Lebanon, 1976: Dark Green – controlled by Syria; Purple – controlled by Maronite groups; Light Green – controlled by Palestinian militias

The Lebanese Civil War had its origin in the conflicts and political compromises of Lebanon's post-Ottoman period and was exacerbated by the nation's changing demographic trends, inter-religious strife, and proximity to Syria, the Palestine Liberation Organization, and Israel. By 1975, Lebanon was a religiously and ethnically diverse country with most dominant groups of Maronite Christians, Eastern Orthodox Christians, Sunni Muslims and Shia Muslims; with significant minorities of Druze, Kurds, Armenians, and Palestinian refugees and their descendants.

Events and political movements that contributed to Lebanon's violent implosion include, among others, the emergence of Arab nationalism, Arab socialism in the context of the Cold War, the Arab–Israeli conflict, Ba'athism, the Iranian Revolution, Palestinian militants, Black September in Jordan, Islamic fundamentalism, and the Iran–Iraq War.

In all, it is estimated that more than 100,000 were killed, and another 100,000 handicapped by injuries, during Lebanon's 16-year war. Up to one-fifth of the pre-war resident population, or about 900,000 people, were displaced from their homes, of whom perhaps a quarter of a million emigrated permanently. Thousands of people lost limbs during many stages of planting of land-mines.

The War can be divided broadly into several periods: The initial outbreak in the mid–1970s, the Syrian and then Israeli intervention of the late 1970s, escalation of the PLO-Israeli conflict in the early 1980s, the 1982 Israeli invasion, a brief period of multinational involvement, and finally resolution which took the form of Syrian occupation.

Constitutionally guaranteed Christian control of the government had come under increasing fire from Muslims and leftists, leading them to join forces as the National Movement in 1969, which called for the taking of a new census and the subsequent drafting of a new governmental structure that would reflect the census results. Political tension became military conflict, with full-scale civil war in April 1975. The leadership called for Syrian intervention in 1976, leading to the presence of Syrian troops in Lebanon, and an Arab summit in 1976 was called to stop the crisis.

In the south, military exchanges between Israel and the PLO led Israel to support Saad Haddad's South Lebanon Army (SLA) in an effort to establish a security belt along Israel's northern border, an effort which intensified in 1977 with the election of new Israeli prime minister Menachem Begin. In March 1978 Israel invaded Lebanon in response to Fatah attacks in Israel. During Fatah attack also known as Coastal Road Massacre, Palestinian terrorists hijacked a bus on the Coastal Highway of Israel and murdered its occupants; 38 Israeli civilians, including 13 children. Eventually, Israel took control of most of the area south of the Litani River. It resulted in the evacuation of at least 100,000 Lebanese, as well as approximately 2,000 deaths.

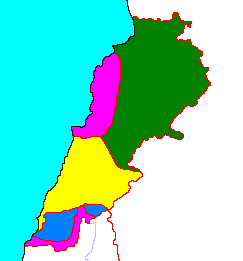
Map showing power balance in Lebanon, 1983: Green – controlled by Syria, purple – controlled by Christian groups, yellow – controlled by Israel, blue – controlled by the United Nations

The UN Security Council passed Resolution 425 calling for an immediate Israeli withdrawal and creating the UN Interim Force in Lebanon (UNIFIL), charged with maintaining peace. Israeli forces withdrew later in 1978, leaving an SLA-controlled border strip as a protective buffer against PLO cross-border attacks.

In addition to the fighting between religious groups, there was rivalry between Maronite groups. In June 1978 one of Suleiman Franjieh's sons, Tony, was killed along with his wife and infant daughter in a nighttime attack on their town, reportedly by Bashir Gemayel, Samir Geagea, and their Phalangist forces.

Concurrently, tension between Syria and Phalange increased Israeli support for the Maronite group and led to direct Israeli-Syrian exchanges in April 1981, leading to American diplomatic intervention. Philip Habib was dispatched to the region to head off further escalation, which he successfully did via an agreement concluded in May.

Intra-Palestinian fighting and PLO-Israeli conflict continued, and 24 July 1981, Habib brokered a cease-fire agreement with the PLO and Israel: the two sides agreed to cease hostilities in Lebanon proper and along the Israeli border with Lebanon.

After continued PLO-Israeli exchanges, Israel invaded Lebanon on 6 June 1982, using the codename Operation Peace for Galilee. By 15 June of the same year, Israeli units were entrenched in the outskirts of Beirut and Yassir Arafat attempted through negotiations to evacuate the PLO. It is estimated that during the entire campaign, including the Israeli siege on Beirut from June to August, approximately 20,000 were killed on all sides, including many civilians. These figures do not include the Sabra and Shatila massacre, in which between 700-3500 Palestinians were killed. A multinational force composed of U.S. Marines and French and Italian units arrived to ensure the departure of the PLO and protect civilians. Nearly 15,000 Palestinian militants were evacuated by 1 September.

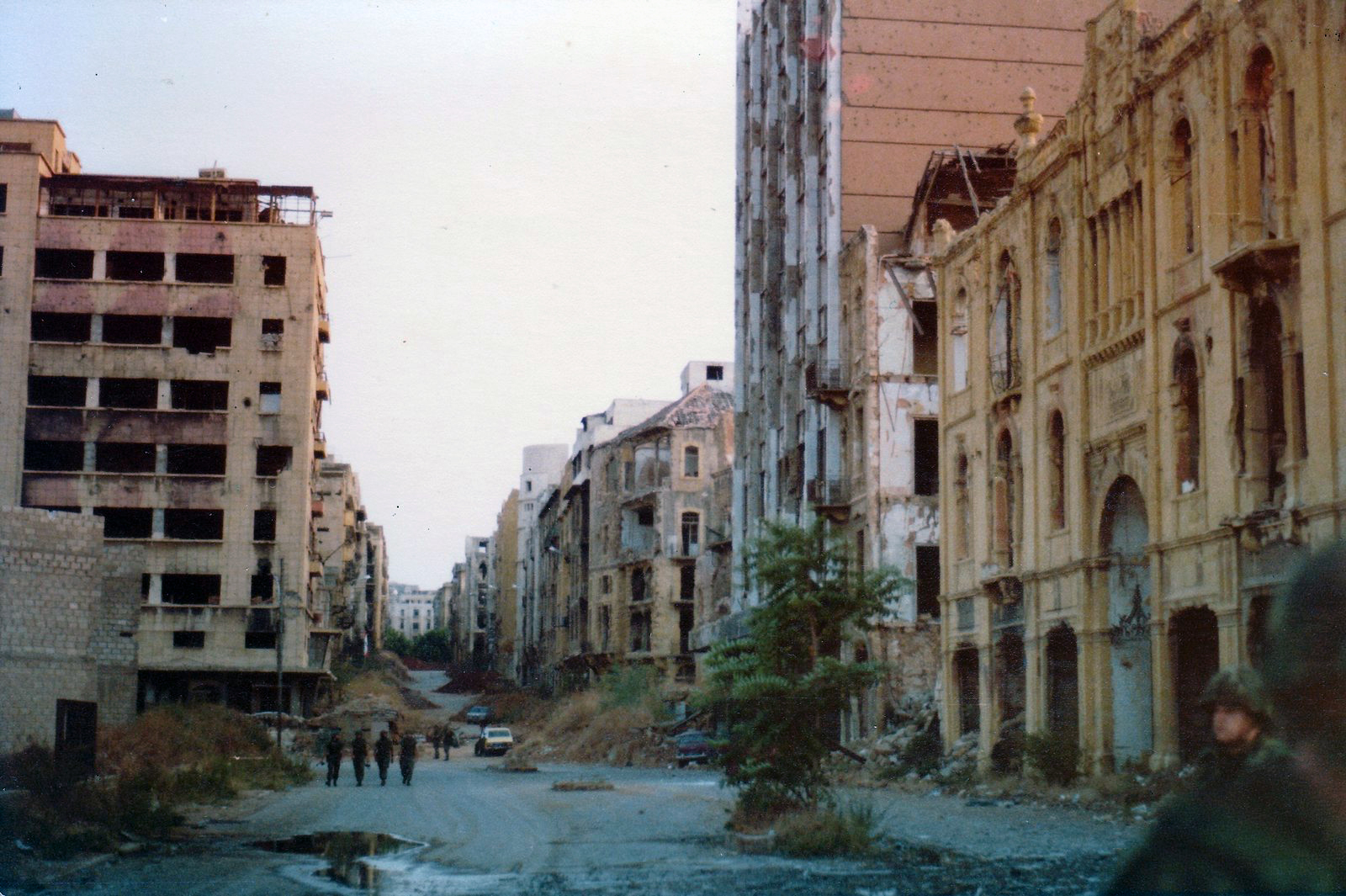
The Green Line that separated West and East Beirut, 1982

Although Bashir Gemayel did not cooperate with the Israelis publicly, his long history of tactical collaboration with Israel counted against him in the eyes of many Lebanese, especially Muslims. Although the only announced candidate for the presidency of the republic, the National Assembly elected him by the second-narrowest margin in Lebanese history (57 votes out of 92) on 23 August 1982; most Muslim members of the Assembly boycotted the vote. Nine days before he was due to take office, Gemayel was assassinated along with twenty-five others in an explosion at the Kataeb party headquarters in Beirut's Christian neighborhood of Achrafieh on 14 September 1982.

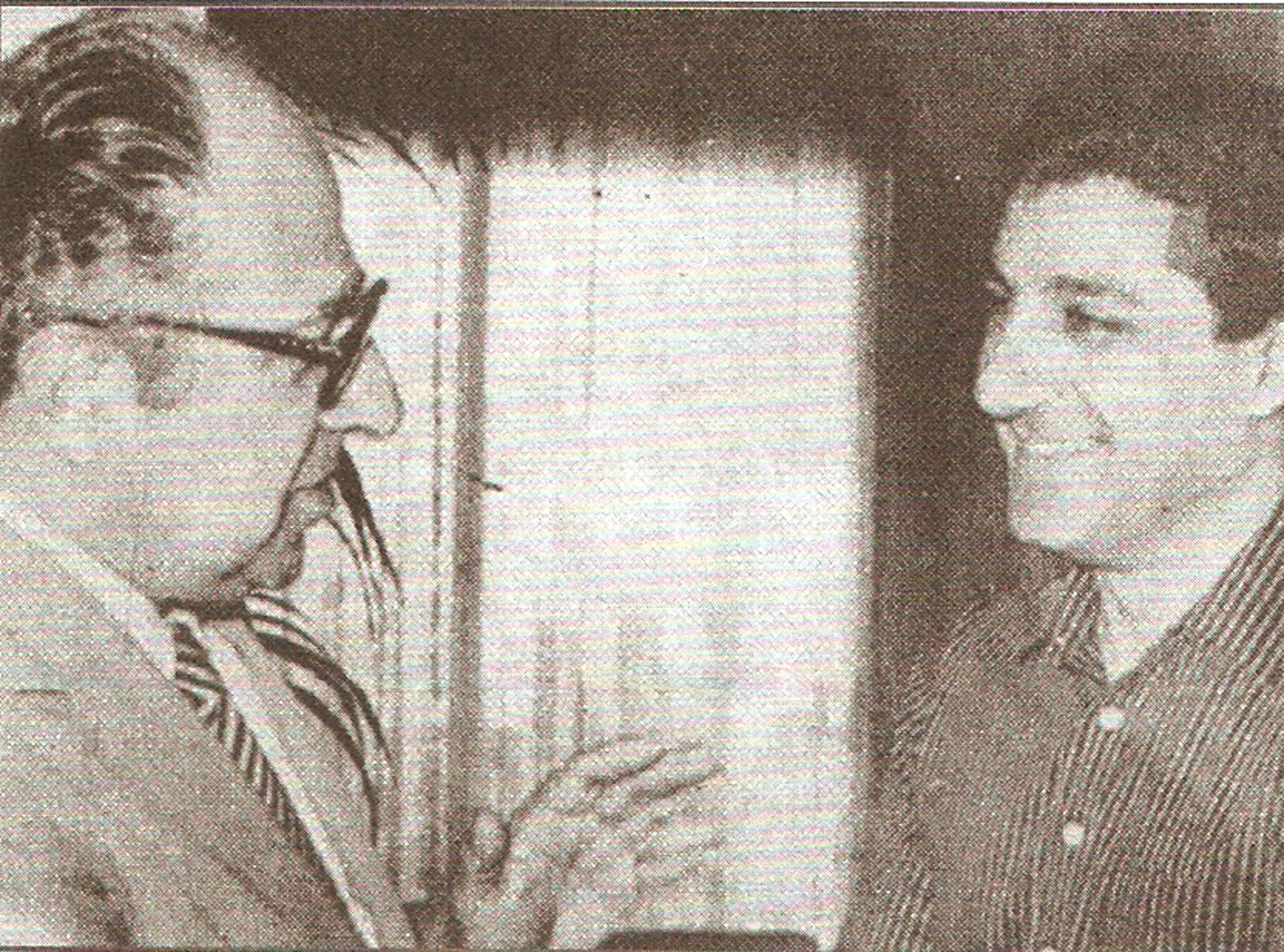
Bachir Gemayel with Philipe Habib

Phalangists entered Palestinian camps on 16 September at 6:00 PM and remained until the morning of 19 September, massacring 700-3500 Palestinians, "none apparently members of any PLO unit". This attack, known as the Sabra and Shatila massacre, was enabled by an Israeli advance in West Beirut which was in breach of a ceasefire agreement. It is believed that the Phalangists considered it retaliation for Gemayel's assassination and for the Damour massacre which PLO fighters had committed earlier in a Christian town.

Bachir Gemayel was succeeded as president by his older brother Amine Gemayel, who served from 1982 to 1988. Rather different in temperament, Amine Gemayel was widely regarded as lacking the charisma and decisiveness of his brother, and many of the latter's followers were dissatisfied.

Amine Gemayel focused on securing the withdrawal of Israeli and Syrian forces. A 17 May 1983, agreement among Lebanon, Israel, and the United States arranged an Israeli withdrawal conditional on the departure of Syrian troops. Syria opposed the agreement and declined to discuss the withdrawal of its troops, effectively stalemating further progress.

In 1983 the IDF withdrew southward and left the Chouf, and would remain only in the "security zone" until the year 2000. That led to the Mountain War between the Druze Progressive Socialist Party and the Maronite Lebanese Forces. The PSP won the decisive battle that occurred in the Chouf and Aley District and inflected heavy losses to the LF. The result was the expulsion of the Christians from the Southern Mount Lebanon.

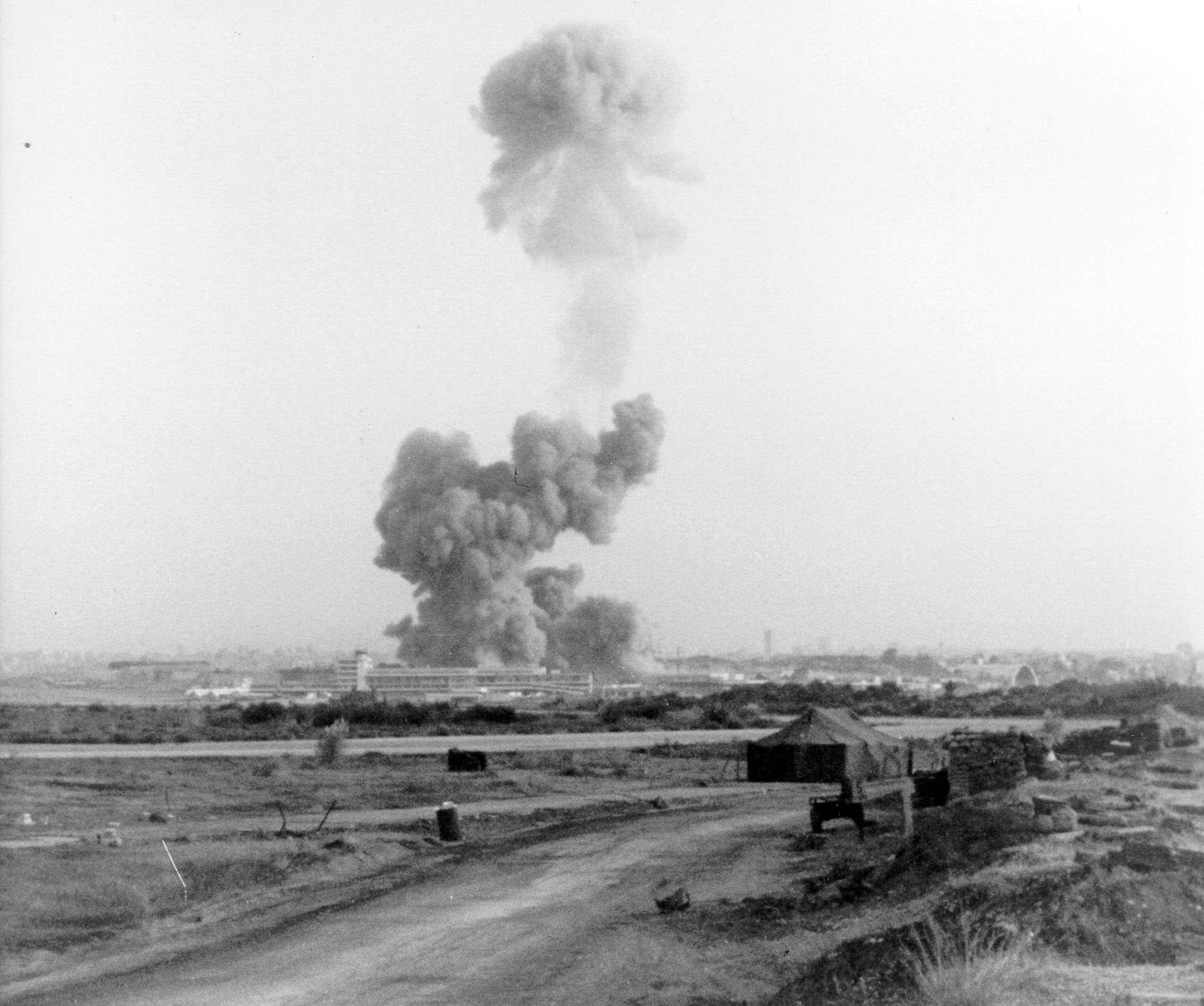
Explosion at the Marine barracks seen from afar

Intense attacks against U.S. and Western interests, including two truck bombings of the US Embassy in 1983 and 1984 and the landmark attacks on the U.S. Marine and French parachute regiment barracks on 23 October 1983, led to an American withdrawal.

The virtual collapse of the Lebanese Army in the 6 February 1984 Intifada in Beirut, led by the PSP and Amal, the two main allies, was a major blow to the government. On 5 March, as a result of the Intifada and the Mountain War, the Lebanese Government canceled the 17 May 1983 agreement. The US Marines departed a few weeks later.

Between 1985 and 1989, heavy fighting took place in the "War of the Camps". The Shi'a Muslim Amal militia sought to rout the Palestinians from Lebanese strongholds.

Combat returned to Beirut in 1987, with Palestinians, leftists and Druze fighters allied against Amal. After winning the battle, the PSP controlled West Beirut. The Syrians then entered Beirut. This combat was fueled by the Syrians in order to take control of Beirut by taking as a pretext of stopping the fights between the brothers, the PSP and Amal. Violent confrontation flared up again in Beirut in 1988 between Amal and Hezbollah.

Meanwhile, on the political front, Prime Minister Rashid Karami, head of a government of national unity set up after the failed peace efforts of 1984, was assassinated on 1 June 1987. President Gemayel's term of office expired in September 1988. Before stepping down, he appointed another Maronite Christian, Lebanese Armed Forces Commanding General Michel Aoun, as acting prime minister, as was his right under the Lebanese constitution of 1943. This action was highly controversial.

Muslim groups rejected the move and pledged support to Selim al-Hoss, a Sunni who had succeeded Karami. Lebanon was thus divided between a Christian government in East Beirut and a Muslim government in West Beirut, with no president.

In February 1989, General Aoun launched the "War of liberation", a war against the Syrian Armed Forces in Lebanon. His campaign was partially supported by a few foreign nations but the method and approach was disputed within the Christian community. This led to the Lebanese forces to abstain from the Syrian attack against Aoun. In October 1990, the Syrian air force, backed by the US and pro-Syrian Lebanese groups (including Hariri, Joumblatt, Berri, Geagea and Lahoud) attacked the Presidential Palace at B'abda and forced Aoun to take refuge in the French embassy in Beirut and later go into exile in Paris. 13 October 1990, is regarded as the date the civil war ended, and Syria is widely recognized as playing a critical role in its end.

The Taif Agreement of 1989 marked the beginning of the end of the war, and was ratified on 4 November. President Rene Mouawad was elected the following day, but was assassinated in a car bombing in Beirut on 22 November as his motorcade returned from Lebanese independence day ceremonies. He was succeeded by Elias Hrawi, who remained in office until 1998.

In August 1990, the parliament and the new president agreed on constitutional amendments embodying some of the political reforms envisioned at Taif. The National Assembly expanded to 128 seats and was divided equally between Christians and Muslims. In March 1991, parliament passed an amnesty law that pardoned most political crimes prior to its enactment, excepting crimes perpetrated against foreign diplomats or certain crimes referred by the cabinet to the Higher Judicial Council.

In May 1991, the militias (with the important exception of Hizballah) were dissolved, and the Lebanese Armed Forces began to slowly rebuild themselves as Lebanon's only major non-sectarian institution.

Some violence still occurred. In late December 1991 a car bomb (estimated to carry 100 kg (220 lb) of TNT) exploded in the Muslim neighborhood of Basta. At least thirty people were killed, and 120 wounded, including former prime minister Shafik Wazzan, who was riding in a bulletproof car. It was the deadliest car bombing in Lebanon since 18 June 1985, when an explosion in the northern Lebanese port of Tripoli killed sixty people and wounded 110.

The last of the Westerners kidnapped by Hezbollah during the mid–1980s were released in May 1992.

== Second Lebanese Republic ==
Since the end of the war, the Lebanese have conducted several elections, most of the militias have been weakened or disbanded, and the Lebanese Armed Forces (LAF) have extended central government authority over about two-thirds of the country. Only Hezbollah retained its weapons, and was supported by the Lebanese parliament in doing so, as they had defended Lebanon against the Israeli occupation. Syria on the other hand kept its military presence in most of Lebanon, also holding various government institutions in the country, strengthening its occupation. The Israeli forces finally withdrew from south of Lebanon in May 2000, though the Syrian occupation of most Lebanon still continued.

By early November 1992, a new parliament had been elected, and Prime Minister Rafiq Hariri had formed a cabinet, retaining for himself the finance portfolio. The formation of a government headed by a successful billionaire businessman was widely seen as a sign that Lebanon would make a priority of rebuilding the country and reviving the economy. Solidere, a private real estate company set up to rebuild downtown Beirut, was a symbol of Hariri's strategy to link economic recovery to private sector investment. After the election of then-commander of the Lebanese Armed Forces Émile Lahoud as president in 1998 following Hrawi's extended term as president, Salim al-Hoss again served as prime minister. Hariri returned to office as prime minister in November 2000. Although problems with basic infrastructure and government services persist, and Lebanon is now highly indebted, much of the civil war damage has been repaired throughout the country, and many foreign investors and tourists have returned.

Postwar social and political instability, fueled by economic uncertainty and the collapse of the Lebanese currency, led to the resignation of Prime Minister Omar Karami, also in May 1992, after less than 2 years in office. He was replaced by former prime minister Rachid Solh, who was widely viewed as a caretaker to oversee Lebanon's first parliamentary elections in 20 years.

If Lebanon has in part recovered over the past decade from the catastrophic damage to infrastructure of its long civil war, the social and political divisions that gave rise to and sustained that conflict remain largely unresolved. Parliamentary and more recently municipal elections have been held with fewer irregularities and more popular participation than in the immediate aftermath of the conflict, and Lebanese civil society generally enjoys significantly more freedoms than elsewhere in the Arab world. However, there are continuing sectarian tensions and unease about Syrian and other external influences.

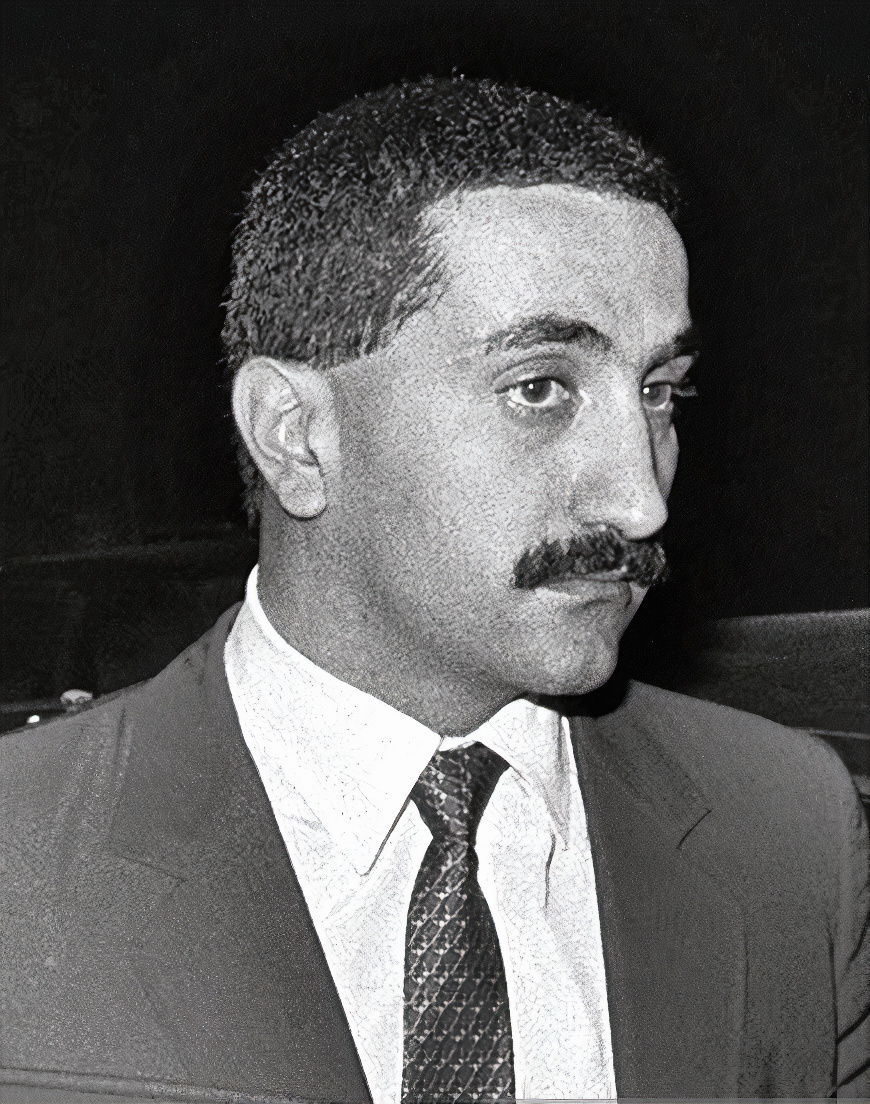
Portrait of Elie Hobeika

In the late 1990s, the government took action against Sunni Muslim extremists in the north who had attacked its soldiers, and it continues to move against groups such as Asbat al-Ansar, which has been accused of being partnered with Osama bin Laden's al-Qaida network. On 24 January 2002, Elie Hobeika, another former Lebanese Forces figure associated with the Sabra and Shatilla massacres who later served in three cabinets and the parliament, was assassinated in a car bombing in Beirut.

During Lebanon's civil war, Syria's troop deployment in Lebanon was legitimized by the Lebanese Parliament in the Taif Agreement, supported by the Arab League, and is given a major share of the credit for finally bringing the civil war to an end in October 1990. In the ensuing fifteen years, Damascus and Beirut justified Syria's continued military presence in Lebanon by citing the continued weakness of a Lebanese armed forces faced with both internal and external security threats, and the agreement with the Lebanese Government to implement all of the constitutional reforms in the Taif Agreement. Under Taif, the Hezbollah militia was eventually to be dismantled, and the LAF allowed to deploy along the border with Israel. Lebanon was called on to deploy along its southern border by UN Security Council Resolution 1391, urged to do so by UN Resolution UN Security Council Resolution 1496, and deployment was demanded by UN Security Council Resolution 1559. The Syrian military and intelligence presence in Lebanon was criticised by some on Lebanon's right-wing inside and outside of the country, others believed it helped to prevent renewed civil war and discourage Israeli aggression, and others believed its presence and influence was helpful for Lebanese stability and peace but should be scaled back. Major powers United States and France rejected Syrian reasoning that they were in Lebanon by the consent of the Lebanese government. They insist that the latter had been co-opted and that in fact Lebanon's Government was a Syrian puppet.

Up to 2005, 14–15,000 Syrian troops (down from 35,000) remained in position in many areas of Lebanon, although the Taif called for an agreement between the Syrian and Lebanese Governments by September 1992 on their redeployment to Lebanon's Bekaa Valley. Syria's refusal to exit Lebanon following Israel's 2000 withdrawal from south Lebanon first raised criticism among the Lebanese Maronite Christians and Druze, who were later joined by many of Lebanon's Sunni Muslims. Lebanon's Shiites, on the other hand, have long supported the Syrian presence, as has the Hezbollah militia group and political party. The U.S. began applying pressure on Syria to end its occupation and cease interfering with internal Lebanese matters. In 2004, many believe Syria pressured Lebanese MPs to back a constitutional amendment to revise term limitations and allow Lebanon's two term pro-Syrian president Émile Lahoud to run for a third time. France, Germany and the United Kingdom, along with many Lebanese politicians joined the U.S. in denouncing alleged Syrian interference. On 2 September 2004, the UN Security Council adopted UN Security Council Resolution 1559, authored by France and the U.S. in an uncommon show of cooperation. The resolution called "upon all remaining foreign forces to withdraw from Lebanon" and "for the disbanding and disarmament of all Lebanese and non-Lebanese militias".

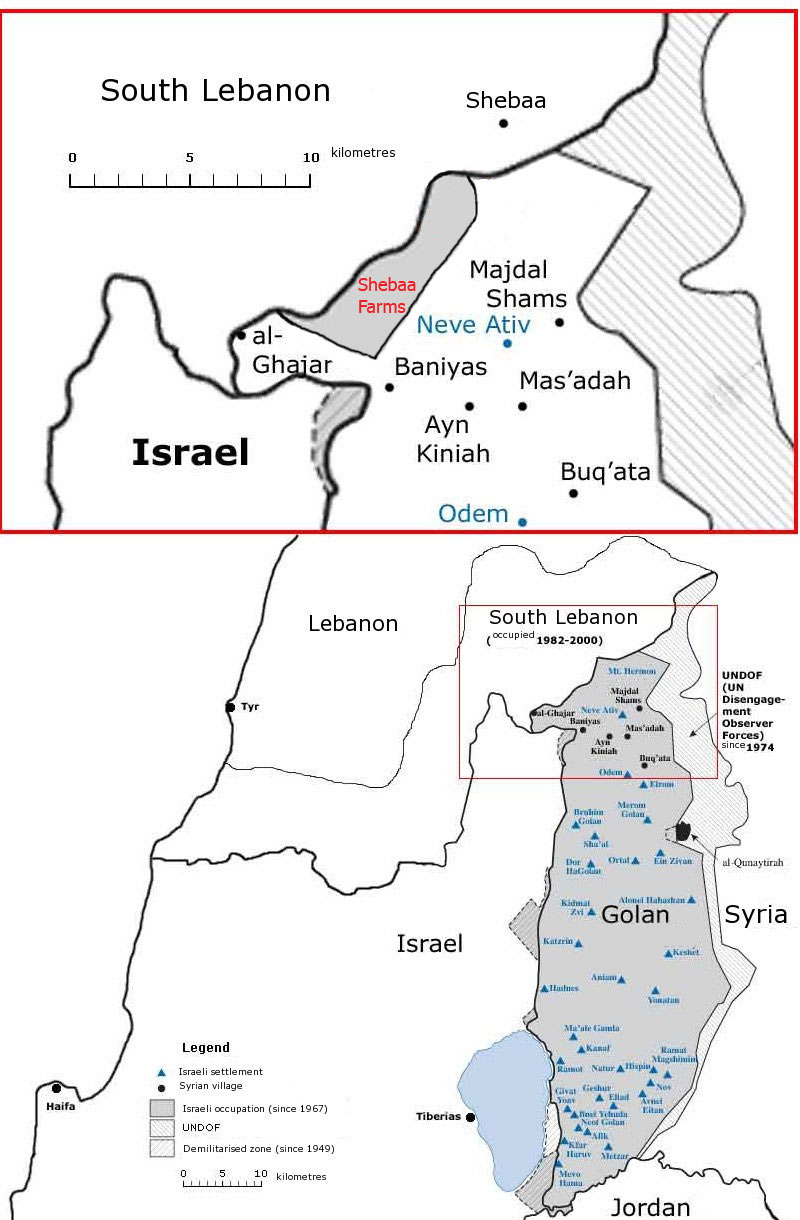
Map of the Shebaa farms

On 25 May 2000, Israel completed its withdrawal from the south of Lebanon in accordance with UN Security Council Resolution 425. A 50-square-kilometre piece of mountain terrain, commonly referred to as the Shebaa farms, remains under the control of Israel. The UN has certified Israel's pullout, and regards the Shebaa Farms as occupied Syrian territory, while Lebanon and Syria have stated they regard the area as Lebanese territory. The 20 January 2005, UN Secretary-General's report on Lebanon stated: "The continually asserted position of the Government of Lebanon that the Blue Line is not valid in the Shab'a farms area is not compatible with Security Council resolutions. The Council has recognized the Blue Line as valid for purposes of confirming Israel's withdrawal pursuant to resolution 425 (1978). The Government of Lebanon should heed the Council's repeated calls for the parties to respect the Blue Line in its entirety."

In Resolution 425, the UN had set a goal of assisting the Lebanese government in a "return of its effective authority in the area", which would require an official Lebanese army presence there. Further, UN Security Council Resolution 1559 requires the dismantling of the Hezbollah militia. Yet, Hezbollah remains deployed along the Blue Line. Both Hezbollah and Israel have violated the Blue Line more than once, according to the UN. The most common pattern of violence have been border incursions by the Hezbollah into the Shebaa Farms area, and then Israeli air strikes into southern Lebanon. The UN Secretary-General has urged "all governments that have influence on Hezbollah to deter it from any further actions which could increase the tension in the area". Staffan de Misura, Personal Representative of the Secretary-General for Southern Lebanon stated that he was "deeply concerned that air violations by Israel across the Blue Line during altercations with Hezbollah are continuing to take place", calling "upon the Israeli authorities to cease such violations and to fully respect the Blue Line". In 2001 de Misura similarly expressed his concern to Lebanon's prime minister for allowing Hezbollah to violate the Blue Line, saying it was a "clear infringement" of UN Resolution 425, under which the UN certified Israel's withdrawal from south Lebanon as complete. On 28 January 2005, UN Security Council Resolution 1583 called upon the Government of Lebanon to fully extend and exercise its sole and effective authority throughout the south, including through the deployment of sufficient numbers of Lebanese armed and security forces, to ensure a calm environment throughout the area, including along the Blue Line, and to exert control over the use of force on its territory and from it. On 23 January 2006, The UN Security Council called on the Government of Lebanon to make more progress in controlling its territory and disbanding militias, while also calling on Syria to cooperate with those efforts. In a statement read out by its January President, Augustine Mahiga of Tanzania, the council also called on Syria to take measures to stop movements of arms and personnel into Lebanon.

On 3 September 2004, the National Assembly voted 96–29 to amend the constitution to allow the pro-Syrian president, Émile Lahoud, three more years in office by extending a statute of limitations to nine years. Many regarded this as a second time Syria had pressured Lebanon's Parliament to amend the constitution in a way that favored Lahoud (the first allowing for his election in 1998 immediately after he had resigned as commander-in-chief of the LAF.) Three cabinet ministers were absent from the vote and later resigned. The USA charged that Syria exercised pressure against the National Assembly to amend the constitution, and many of the Lebanese rejected it, saying that it was considered as contradictive to the constitution and its principles. Including these is the Maronite Patriarch Mar Nasrallah Boutros Sfeir—the most eminent religious figure for Maronites—and the Druze leader Walid Jumblatt.

To the surprise of many, Prime Minister Rafiq Hariri, who had vehemently opposed this amendment, appeared to have finally accepted it, and so did most of his party. However, he ended up resigning in protest against the amendment. He was assassinated soon afterwards, triggering the Cedar Revolution. This amendment comes in discordance with the UN Security Council Resolution 1559, which called for a new presidential election in Lebanon.

On 1 October 2004, one of the main dissenting voices to Émile Lahoud's term extension, the newly resigned Druze ex-minister Marwan Hamadeh was the target of a car bomb attack as his vehicle slowed to enter his Beirut home. Mr. Hamadeh and his bodyguard were wounded and his driver killed in the attack. Druze leader Walid Jumblatt appealed for calm, but said the car bomb was a clear message for the opposition. UN Secretary General Kofi Annan expressed his serious concern over the attack.

On 7 October 2004, UN Secretary General Kofi Annan reported to the Security Council that Syria had failed to withdraw its forces from Lebanon. Mr. Annan concluded his report saying that "It is time, 14 years after the end of hostilities and four years after the Israeli withdrawal from Lebanon, for all parties concerned to set aside the remaining vestiges of the past. The withdrawal of foreign forces and the disbandment and disarmament of militias would, with finality, end that sad chapter of Lebanese history.". On 19 October 2004, following the UN Secretary General's report, the UN Security Council voted unanimously (meaning that it received the backing of Algeria, the only Arab member of the Security Council) to put out a statement calling on Syria to pull its troops out of Lebanon, in accordance with Resolution 1559.

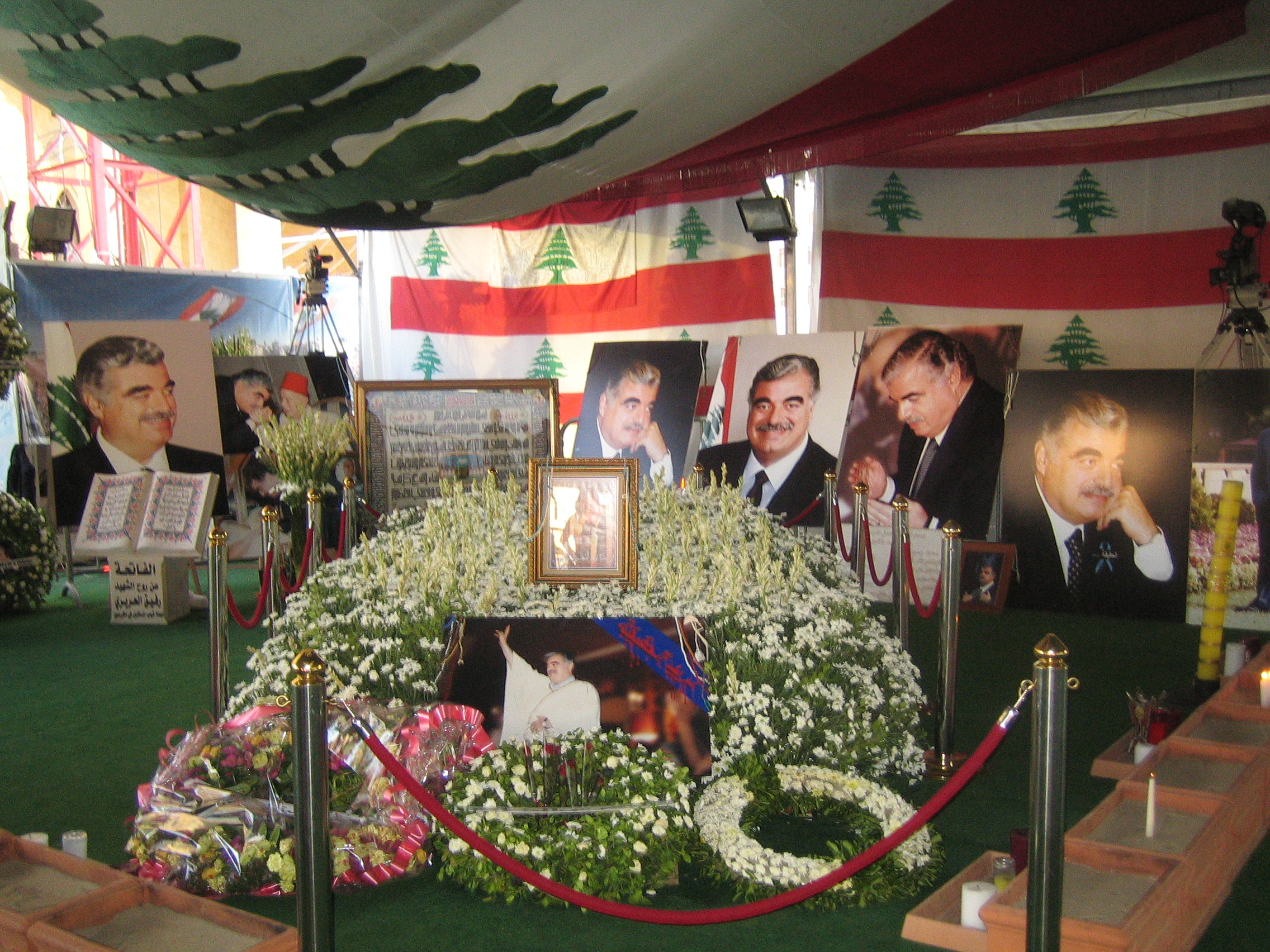
The funeral of the assassinated Prime Minister Rafiq Hariri

On 20 October 2004, Prime Minister Rafiq Hariri resigned; the next day former prime minister and loyal supporter of Syria Omar Karami was appointed prime minister. On 14 February 2005, former prime minister Hariri was assassinated in a car-bomb attack which killed 21 and wounded 100. On 21 February 2005, tens of thousand Lebanese protestors held a rally at the site of the assassination calling for the withdrawal of Syria's peacekeeping forces and blaming Syria and the pro-Syrian president Lahoud for the murder.

Hariri's murder triggered increased international pressure on Syria. In a joint statement U.S. President Bush and French president Chirac condemned the killing and called for full implementation of UNSCR 1559. UN Secretary-General Kofi Annan announced that he was sending a team led by Ireland's deputy police commissioner, Peter FitzGerald, to investigate the assassination. And while Arab League head Amr Moussa declared that Syrian president Assad promised him a phased withdrawal over a two-year period, the Syrian Information Minister Mahdi Dakhlallah said Mr Moussa had misunderstood the Syrian leader. Mr Dakhlallah said that Syria will merely move its troops to eastern Lebanon. Russia, Germany, and Saudi Arabia all called for Syrian troops to leave.

Local Lebanese pressure mounted as well. As daily protests against the Syrian occupation grew to 25,000, a series of dramatic events occurred. Massive protests such as these had been quite uncommon in the Arab world, and while in the 90s most anti-Syrian demonstrators were predominantly Christian, the new demonstrations were Christian and Sunni. On 28 February the government of pro-Syrian prime minister Omar Karami resigned, calling for a new election to take place. Mr Karami said in his announcement: "I am keen the government will not be a hurdle in front of those who want the good for this country." The tens of thousands gathered at Beirut's Martyrs' Square cheered the announcement, then chanted "Karami has fallen, your turn will come, Lahoud, and yours, Bashar". Opposition MPs were also not satisfied with Karami's resignation, and kept pressing for full Syrian withdrawal. Former minister and MP Marwan Hamadeh, who survived a similar car bomb attack on 1 October 2004, said "I accuse this government of incitement, negligence and shortcomings at the least, and of covering up its planning at the most... if not executing". Two days later Syrian leader Bashar al-Assad announced that his troops will leave Lebanon completely "in the next few months". Responding to the announcement, opposition leader Walid Jumblatt said that he wanted to hear more specifics from Damascus about any withdrawal: "It's a nice gesture but 'next few months' is quite vague—we need a clear-cut timetable".

On 5 March Syrian leader Assad declared in a televised speech that Syria would withdraw its forces to the Bekaa Valley in eastern Lebanon, and then to the border between Syria and Lebanon. Assad did not provide a timetable for a complete withdrawal of Syrian forces from Lebanon—14,000 soldiers and intelligence agents. Meanwhile, Hezbollah leader Nasrallah called for a "massive popular gathering" on Tuesday against UN Resolution 1559 saying "The resistance will not give up its arms ... because Lebanon needs the resistance to defend it", and added "all the articles of UN resolution give free services to the Israeli enemy who should have been made accountable for his crimes and now finds that he is being rewarded for his crimes and achieves all its demands". In opposition to Nasrallah's call, Monday, 7 March saw at least 70,000 people—with some estimates putting the number at twice as high—gathered at central Martyrs' Square to demand that Syria leave completely.

The following day a pro-Syrian demonstration set a new record when Hezbollah amassed 400,000–500,000 protestors at Riad Solh square in Beirut, most of them bussed in from the heavily Shi'ite south Lebanon and eastern Beka'a valley. The show of power demonstrated Hezbollah's influence, wealth and organization as the sole Lebanese party allowed to hold a militia by Syria. In his speech Nasrallah blasted UN Security-Council Resolution 1559, which calls for Hezbollah's militia to be disbanded, as foreign intervention. Nasrallah also reiterated his earlier calls for the destruction of Israel saying "To this enemy we say again: There is no place for you here and there is no life for you among us. Death to Israel!". Though Hezbollah organized a very successful rally, opposition leaders were quick to point out that Hezbollah had active support from Lebanon's government and Syria. While the pro-democracy rallies had to deal with road blocks forcing protestors to either turn back or march long distances to Martyr's Square, Hezbollah was able to bus people directly to Riad Solh square. Dory Chamoun, an opposition leader, pointed out that "the difference is that in our demonstrations, people arrive voluntarily and on foot, not in buses". Another opposition member said the pro-Syrian government pressured people to turn out and some reports said Syria had bused in people from across the border. But on a mountain road leading to Beirut, only one bus with a Syrian license plate was spotted in a convoy of pro-Syrian supporters heading to the capital and Hezbollah officials denied the charges. Opposition MP Akram Chehayeb said "That is where the difference between us and them lies: They asked these people to come and they brought them here, whereas the opposition's supporters come here on their own. Our protests are spontaneous. We have a cause. What is theirs?".

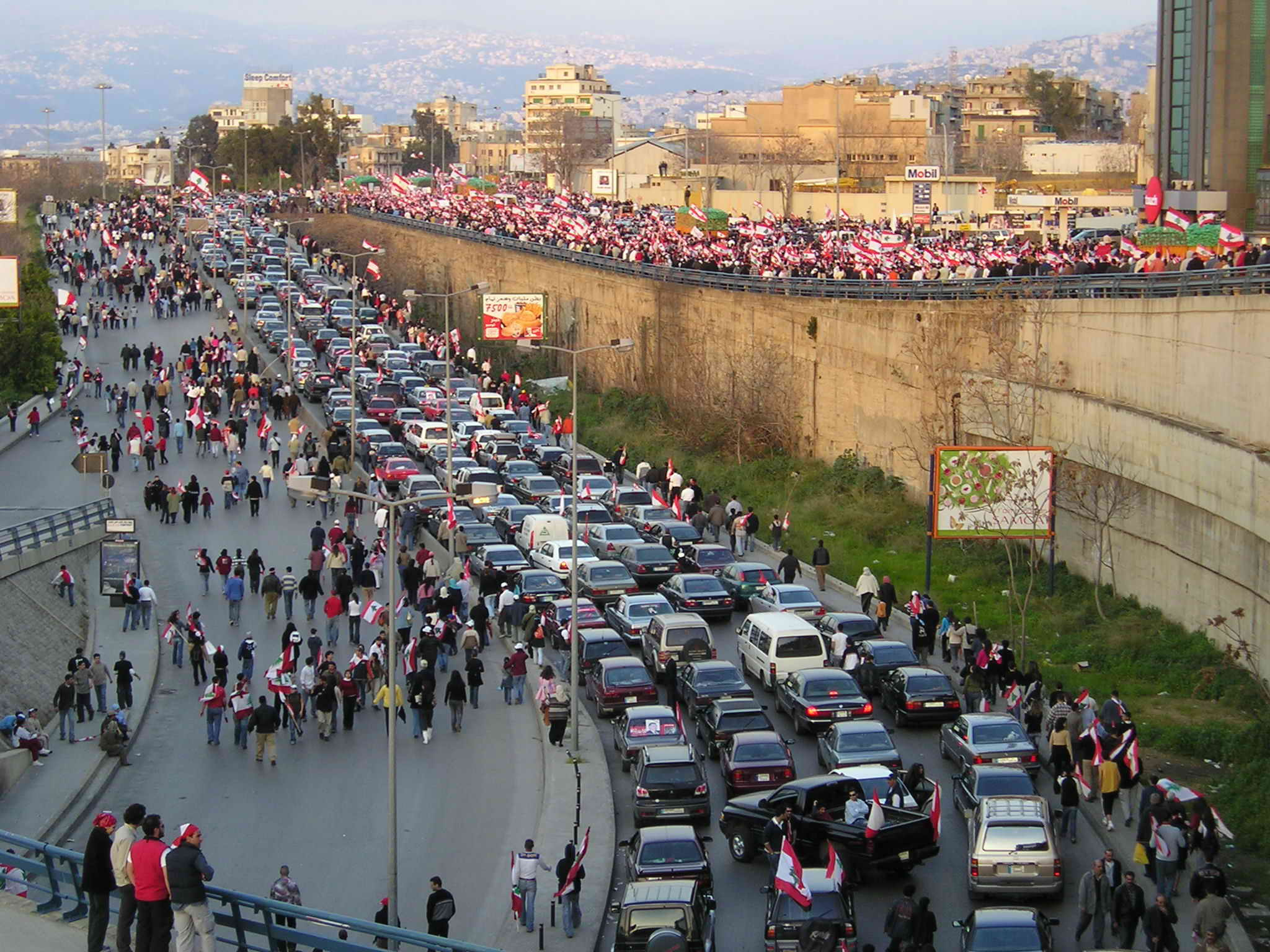
Anti-Syrian protesters heading to Martyrs' Square in Beirut on foot and in vehicles, 13 March 2005

One month after Hariri's murder, an enormous anti-Syrian rally gathered at Martyr's Square in Beirut. Multiple news agencies estimated the crowd at between 800,000 and 1 million—a show of force for the Sunni Muslim, Christian and Druze communities. The rally was double the size of the mostly Shi'ite pro-Syrian one organized by Hezbollah the previous week. When Hariri's sister took a pro-Syrian line saying that Lebanon should "stand by Syria until its land is liberated and it regains its sovereignty on the occupied Golan Heights" the crowd jeered her. This sentiment was prevalent among the rally participants who opposed Hezbollah's refusal to disarm based on the claim that Lebanese and Syrian interests are linked.

=== Cedar Revolution and 2006 War (2005–2006) ===
Jamil Al Sayyed, a Syrian ally in the Lebanese security forces, resigned on 25 April, just a day before the final Syrian troops pulled out of Lebanon.

On 26 April 2005, the last 250 Syrian troops left Lebanon. During the departure ceremonies, Ali Habib, Syria's chief of staff, said that Syria's president had decided to recall his troops after the Lebanese army had been "rebuilt on sound national foundations and became capable of protecting the state."

UN forces led by Senegalese Mouhamadou Kandji and guided by Lebanese Imad Anka were sent to Lebanon to verify the military withdrawal which was mandated by Security Council resolution 1559.

Following the Syrian withdrawal a series of assassinations of Lebanese politicians and journalists with the anti-Syrian camp had begun. Many bombings have occurred to date and have triggered condemnations from the UN Security Council and UN Secretary General.

Eight months after Syria withdrew from Lebanon under intense domestic and international outrage over the assassination of Lebanese prime minister Rafiq Hariri the UN investigation has yet to be completed. While UN investigator Detlev Mehlis has pointed the finger at Syria's intelligence apparatus in Lebanon he has yet to be allowed full access to Syrian officials who are suspected by the United Nations International Independent Investigation Commission (UNIIIC) as being behind the assassination. In its latest report UNIIIC said it had "credible information" that Syrian officials had arrested and threatened close relatives of a witness who recanted testimony he had previously given the commission, and that two Syrian suspects it questioned indicated that all Syrian intelligence documents on Lebanon had been burned. A campaign of bomb attacks against politicians, journalists and even civilian neighborhoods associated with the anti-Syrian camp has provoked much negative attention for Syria in the UN and elsewhere.

On 15 December 2005, the UN Security Council extended the mandate of the UNIIIC.

On 30 December 2005, Syria's former vice-president, Abdul Halim Khaddam, said that "Hariri received many threats" from Syria's President Bashar Al-Assad. Prior to Syria's withdrawal from Lebanon Mr Khaddam was in charge of Syria's Lebanon policy and mainly responsible for Syria's abuse of Lebanon's resources. Many believe that Khaddam seized the opportunity to clear his history of corruption and blackmail.

Parliament voted for the release of the former Lebanese Forces warlord Samir Geagea in the first session since election were held in the spring of 2005. Geagea was the only leader during the civil war to be charged with crimes related to that conflict. With the return of Michel Aoun, the climate was right to try to heal wounds to help unite the country after former prime minister Rafik Hariri was assassinated on 14 February 2005. Geagea was released on 26 July 2005 and left immediately for an undisclosed European nation to undergo medical examinations and convalesce.

During the Cedar Revolution Hezbollah organized a series of pro-Syrian rallies. Hezbollah became a part of the Lebanese government following the 2005 elections but is at a crossroads regarding the UNSCR 1559 call for its militia to be dismantled. On 21 November 2005, Hezbollah launched an attack along the entire border with Israel, the heaviest in the five and a half years since Israel's withdrawal. The barrage was supposed to provide tactical cover for an attempt by a squad of Hezbollah special forces to abduct Israeli troops in the Israeli side of the village of Al-Ghajar. The attack failed when an ambush by the IDF Paratroopers killed 4 Hezbollah members and scattered the rest. The UN Security Council accused Hezbollah of initiating the hostilities.

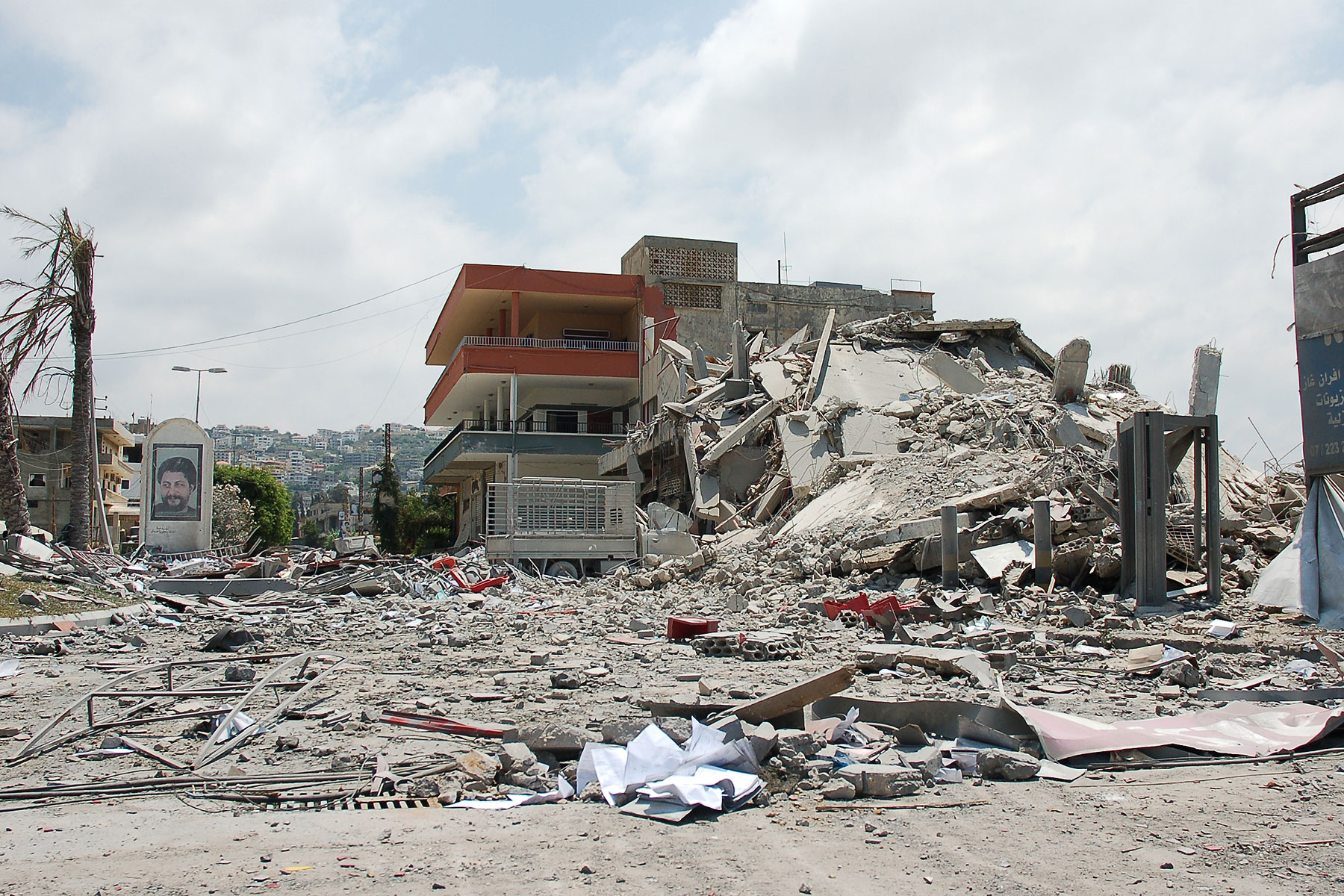
A building in Ghazieh, near Sidon, bombed by the Israeli Air Force (IAF), 20 July 2006

On 27 December 2005, Katyusha rockets fired from Hezbollah territory smashed into houses in the Israeli village of Kiryat Shmona wounding three people. UN Secretary General Kofi Annan called on the Lebanese Government "to extend its control over all its territory, to exert its monopoly on the use of force, and to put an end to all such attacks". Lebanese Prime Minister Fuad Saniora denounced the attack as "aimed at destabilizing security and diverting attention from efforts exerted to solve the internal issues prevailing in the country". On 30 December 2005, the Lebanese army dismantled two other Katyusha rockets found in the border town of Naqoura, an action suggesting increased vigilance following PM Saniora's angry remarks. In a new statement Saniora also rejected claims by Al-Qaeda that it was responsible for the attack and insisted again that it was a domestic action challenging his government's authority.

The 2006 Lebanon War was a 34-day military conflict in Lebanon and northern Israel. The principal parties were Hezbollah paramilitary forces and the Israeli military. The conflict started on 12 July 2006, and continued until a United Nations-brokered ceasefire went into effect in the morning on 14 August 2006, though it formally ended on 8 September 2006 when Israel lifted its naval blockade of Lebanon.

=== Instability and Syrian War spillover ===
In 2007, the Nahr al-Bared refugee camp became the center of the 2007 Lebanon conflict between the Lebanese Army and Fatah al-Islam. At least 169 soldiers, 287 insurgents and 47 civilians were killed in the battle. Funds for the reconstruction of the area have been slow to materialize.

Between 2006 and 2008, a series of protests led by groups opposed to the pro-Western Prime Minister Fouad Siniora demanded the creation of a national unity government, over which the mostly Shia opposition groups would have veto power. When Émile Lahoud's presidential term ended in October 2007, the opposition refused to vote for a successor unless a power-sharing deal was reached, leaving Lebanon without a president.

On 9 May 2008, Hezbollah and Amal forces, sparked by a government declaration that Hezbollah's communications network was illegal, seized western Beirut, leading to the 2008 conflict in Lebanon. The Lebanese government denounced the violence as a coup attempt. At least 62 people died in the resulting clashes between pro-government and opposition militias. On 21 May 2008, the signing of the Doha Agreement ended the fighting. As part of the accord, which ended 18 months of political paralysis, Michel Suleiman became president and a national unity government was established, granting a veto to the opposition. The agreement was a victory for opposition forces, as the government caved in to all their main demands.

In early January 2011, the national unity government collapsed due to growing tensions stemming from the Special Tribunal for Lebanon, which was expected to indict Hezbollah members for the Hariri assassination. The parliament elected Najib Mikati, the candidate for the Hezbollah-led March 8 Alliance, Prime Minister of Lebanon, making him responsible for forming a new government. Hezbollah leader Hassan Nasrallah insists that Israel was responsible for the assassination of Hariri. A report leaked by the Al-Akhbar newspaper in November 2010 stated that Hezbollah has drafted plans for a takeover of the country if the Special Tribunal for Lebanon issues an indictment against its members.

In 2012, the Syrian Civil War threatened to spill over in Lebanon, causing more incidents of sectarian violence and armed clashes between Sunnis and Alawites in Tripoli. As of 6 August 2013, more than 677,702 Syrian refugees are in Lebanon. As the number of Syrian refugees increases, the Lebanese Forces Party, the Kataeb Party, and the Free Patriotic Movement fear the country's sectarian based political system is being undermined.

=== 2019 Protests due to liquidity Crisis ===
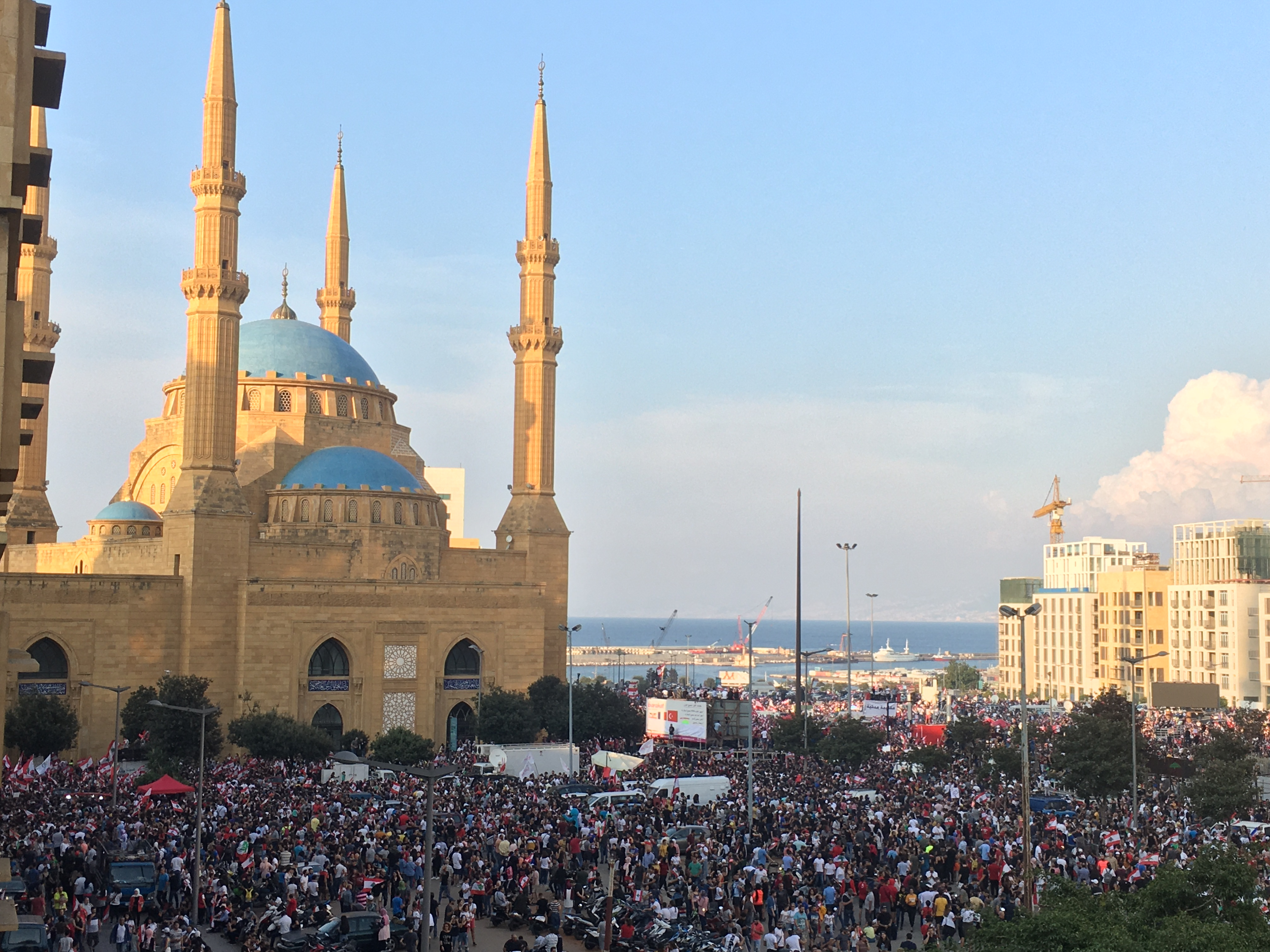
Protesters in Beirut. Mohammad Al-Amin Mosque, 20 October 2019

In October 2019 a series of country-wide protests began in response to many of the government's failures and malfeasances. In the months leading up to the protests there was an ever deepening foreign reserves liquidity crisis. Days before protests broke out, a series of about 100 major wildfires in Chouf, Khroub and other Lebanese areas displaced hundreds of people and caused enormous damage to Lebanese wildlife. The Lebanese government failed to deploy its firefighting equipment due to lack of maintenance and misappropriation of funds. Lebanon had to rely on aid from neighboring Cyprus, Jordan, Turkey and Greece. In November 2019, commercial banks responded to the liquidity crises by imposing illegal capital controls to protect themselves, despite there being no official law by the BDL regarding banking controls.

The protests created a political crisis in Lebanon, with Prime Minister Saad Hariri tendering his resignation and echoing protesters' demands for a government of independent specialists. A cabinet headed by Hassan Diab was formed in 2020.

=== 2020 meltdown of Banque du Liban ===
Concurrently with the COVID–19 pandemic, the Banque du Liban (BdL) in March 2020 defaulted on $90 billion of sovereign debt obligations, triggering a collapse in the value of the Lebanese pound. The decision was taken unanimously at a cabinet meeting under the chairmanship of Hassan Diab on 7 March. That in turn caused the complex and opaque financial engineering with which the BdL maintained the nation's tenuous stability to crash and burn. Simultaneously, commercial banks imposed "informal capital controls limiting the amount of dollars depositors can withdraw as well as transfers abroad." Capital controls were expected to remain in place until at least 2025. It was remarked at the time that Lebanon, whose population is under 7 million, "produces little and imports about 80 percent of the goods it consumes." Debt servicing had consumed 30 percent of recent budgets.

On 25 June the IMF estimated the losses at $49 billion, equivalent "to 91 per cent of Lebanon’s total economic output in 2019, according to World Bank figures... almost equal to the total of value of the deposits held by the Banque du Liban from the country’s commercial banks." The government of Lebanon concurred with the IMF estimates. The value of the pound, which had been artificially pegged at £L1,507.5 per U.S. dollar by the BdL, traded on the informal market in June 2020 at £L5,000 to the dollar, and concurrently the BdL welcomed in an official publication the involvement of the IMF.

It came to light in an audit of 2018 BdL finances whose results were revealed on 23 July that the governor of the BdL, Riad Salameh, had fictionalized assets, used creative accounting and cooked the books. Two days earlier the government had announced its contract with New York-based Alvarez & Marsal to conduct "a forensic audit" of BdL finances.

=== Beirut port explosion and state of emergency ===
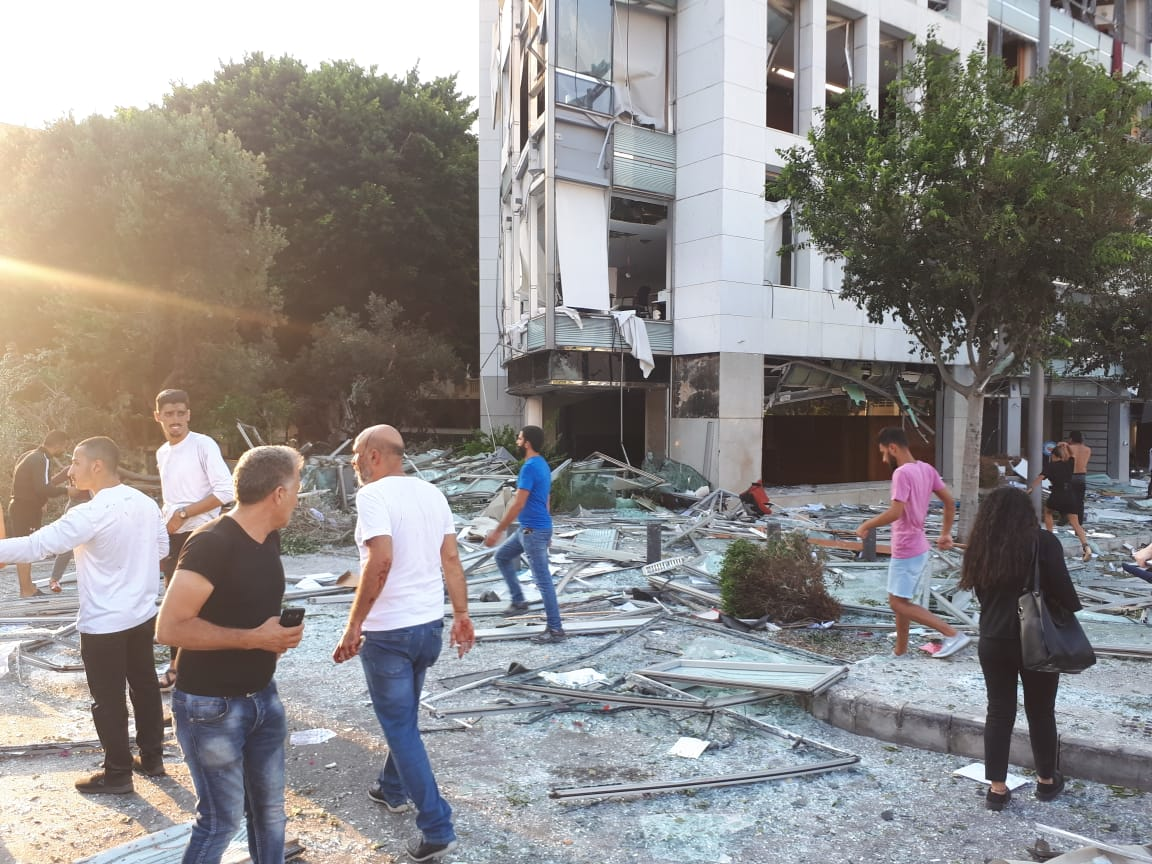
Aftermath of the 4 August 2020 Beirut explosion

On 4 August 2020, the Beirut explosion occurred in the port sector of the city, destroying hectares of buildings and killing over 200 people. It was felt throughout the country. 4 days later on 8 August, a peaceful protest was organized starting from the port of Beirut and destined for the parliament building. The demonstrators were faced with brutal, deadly, and extreme excessive force including the use of live-ammunition by the security apparatus to oppress and subdue demonstrators. 728 demonstrators were injured during the 8 August protests and at least 153 injuries were severe enough to be treated in surrounding hospitals. Amid much popular unrest, the entire cabinet of Hassan Diab resigned on 10 August, and a state of emergency, which gave "the army broad powers to prevent gatherings, censor media and arrest anyone deemed to be a security threat", was declared on 13 August by the caretaker government. On 14 August, Hezbollah leader Hassan Nasrallah "referred to the possibility of civil war" were the anti-government protestors to force an early election. Meanwhile, Iranian foreign minister Javad Zarif complained about the presence of "French and British warships that were deployed to assist in the delivery of medical assistance and other aid." Also on 14 August, the United Nations Office for the Coordination of Humanitarian Affairs (UNOCHA) launched a $565 million appeal for donors of aid to victims of the explosion. The UN effort was to focus on: meals, first aid, shelters, and repair of schools.

Following the resignation of Prime Minister Hassan Diab in August 2020, both Mustafa Adib and Saad Hariri failed to form a government. Najib Mikati was designated to fill the role on 26 July 2021. He received 72 votes out of 128 MPs. On 10 September 2021, Mikati was able to form a government. He announced that he wanted to ask for help from Arab countries to try to get Lebanon out of the crisis it is going through.

On 14 October 2021, clashes erupted in Beirut between the Christian militia Lebanese Forces and Hezbollah fighters supported by the Amal Movement.

In May 2022, Lebanon held its first election since a painful economic crisis dragged it to the brink of becoming a failed state. Lebanon's crisis has been so severe that more than 80 percent of the population is now considered poor by the United Nations. In the election Iran-backed Shia Muslim Hezbollah movement and its allies lost their parliamentary majority. Hezbollah did not lose any of its seats, but its allies lost seats. Hezbollah's ally, President Michel Aoun's Free Patriotic Movement, was no longer the biggest Christian party after the election. A rival Christian party, led by Samir Geagea, with close ties to Saudi Arabia, the Lebanese Forces (LF), made gains. Sunni Future Movement, led by former prime minister Saad Hariri, did not participate the election, leaving a political vacuum to other Sunni politicians to fill.

As of 2023, some consider Lebanon to have become a failed state, suffering from chronic poverty, economic mismanagement and a banking collapse.

=== Middle Eastern crisis (2023–present) ===
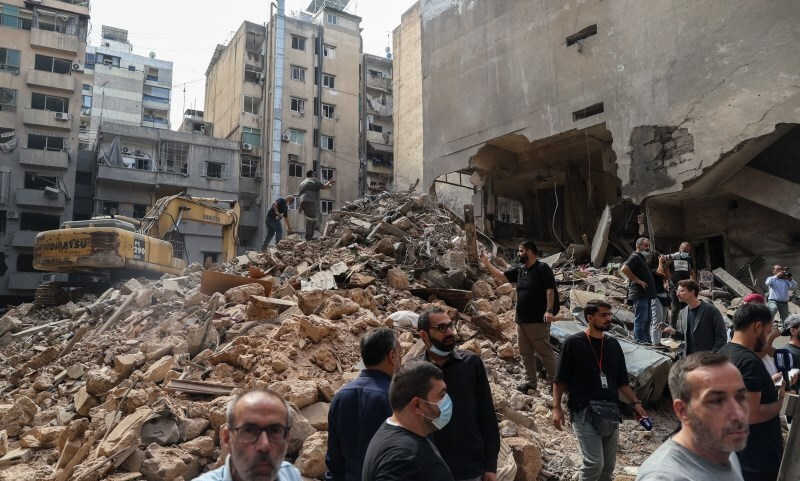
Aftermath of the October 2024 Bachoura airstrike in central Beirut

The Gaza war sparked a renewed Israel–Hezbollah conflict. On 8 October 2023, Hezbollah began launching rockets at northern Israel, displacing over 60,000 Israelis. Hezbollah has said it will not stop attacking Israel until Israel ceases its attacks and military operations in Gaza, where more than 1,600 Israelis and 40,000 Palestinians have been killed. with the Israeli explosion of Hezbollah pagers and walkie talkies in September 2024, the conflict escalated severely, with the 23 September 2024 Israeli airstrikes on Lebanon killing at least 569 over 23 and 24 September, and sparking a mass evacuation of Southern Lebanon. On 27 September 2024, Hassan Nasrallah, the longtime leader of Hezbollah, was killed in a massive Israeli air attack on Beirut. Nasrallah was often described as the most powerful person in Lebanon.

In November 2024, a ceasefire deal was signed between Israel and the Lebanese armed group Hezbollah to end 13 months of conflict. According to the agreement, Hezbollah was given 60 days to end its armed presence in southern Lebanon and Israeli forces were obliged to withdraw from the area over the same period. The fall of Assad’s Baathist regime in Syria was another blow to its Lebanese ally, Hezbollah, which was already weakened because of Israeli military actions. The Syrian regime change in December 2024 was said to start a new chapter in Lebanese politics. In January 2025, Joseph Aoun, the Lebanese army commander, was elected Lebanese 14th president after a two-year vacancy. In February 2025, Prime Minister Nawaf Salam, former president of the International Court of Justice (ICJ), formed a new government of 24 ministers after two-year caretaker cabinet. On 26 February 2025, Lebanon's government of Nawaf Salam won a confidence vote in parliament.

Since 2 March 2026, intensified Israeli attacks across Lebanon have killed over 4,300 people, according to the Lebanese Ministry of Public Health, and displaced nearly 1 million, representing approximately 20% of the country's population.

== See also ==
- Archaeology of Lebanon
- Constitution of Lebanon
- Foreign relations of Lebanon
- History of the Middle East
  - History of Israel
  - History of Syria
- Lebanese Civil War
- Lebanese diaspora
- Politics of Lebanon
- Timeline of Lebanese history
- List of extrajudicial killings and political violence in Lebanon

== Bibliography ==
- Chomsky, Noam (1999). The Fateful Triangle. Black Rose Books. ISBN 978-1551641607.
- Salibi, Kamal (1977). The Modern History of Lebanon. Delmar: Caravan Books. ISBN 0-88206-015-5.
- Salibi, Kamal (1990). A House of Many Mansions: The History of Lebanon Reconsidered. University of California Press. ISBN 978-0-520-07196-4.
- Shehadi, Nadim (1992). Lebanon: A History of Conflict. The Center for Lebanese Studies. ISBN 1-85043-119-1.
- Smith, Charles D. (2006). Palestine and the Arab Israeli Conflict. Bedford/St. Martin's. ISBN 9780312437367.
- White, Arthur S. (1899). The Expansion of Egypt Under Anglo-Egyptian Condominium. Muthen & Co.
