= Zeynabad =

Zeynabad or Zein Abad or Zainabad or Zinabad or Zin Abad (Persian: زين اباد) may refer to:

- Zeynabad, Ardabil
- Zeynabad, East Azerbaijan
- Zeynabad, Darab, Fars Province
- Zeynabad, Qaryah ol Kheyr, Darab County, Fars Province
- Zeynabad, Qir and Karzin, Fars Province
- Zeynabad, Efzal, Qir and Karzin County, Fars Province
- Zeynabad, Kharameh, Fars Province
- Zeynabad, Golestan
- Zinabad, Hamadan
- Zeynabad, Kerman
- Zeynabad, Rafsanjan, Kerman Province
- Zinabad, Khuzestan
- Zeynabad, Qazvin
- Zeynabad, Razavi Khorasan
- Zeynabad, Boshruyeh, South Khorasan Province
- Zeynabad, Nehbandan, South Khorasan Province
- Zeynabad, Khatam, Yazd Province
- Zeynabad, Taft, Yazd Province
- Zeynabad Rural District, in Qazvin Province
