= Abedin =

Abedin is an Arabic name and surname (ʿĀbidīn عابدين). There are also the variant Abideen and the shortened form Abdeen. Abedin means 'worshipping' or 'worshippers'.

== People ==
- Zainu-l-Abideen, "Jewel of the Worshipper", byname of Ali ibn Husayn Zayn al-Abidin or Ali ibn Husayn (d. 713), a great-grandson of Muhammad
- Abidin Bey (c. 1780–1827), Albanian commander and politician of Egypt during the early era of Muhammad Ali's rule
- Huma Abedin (born 1976), American aide to Senator Hillary Clinton
- Humayra Abedin (born 1976), Bangladeshi physician
- Ishaq Isa Abedeen (born 1988), Kenyan-born Bahraini runner
- Kazi Zainul Abedin (1892–1962), Pakistani poet
- Minhajul Abedin (born 1965), Bangladeshi cricketer
- Nurul Abedin (born 1964), Bangladeshi cricketer
- Zainul Abedin (1914–1976), Bangladeshi artist
- Avul Pakir Jainulabdeen Abdul Kalam (1931–2015), 11th President of India

== Places ==
- Named after Abidin Bey:
  - Abdeen (Cairo), a district of Cairo
  - Abdeen Palace, one of the official residences of the President of Egypt
    - Abdeen Palace incident of 1942, military confrontation that took place on 4 February 1942
- Abdeen, a village in the Bsharri District of Lebanon
- Abdin, Daraa Governorate, a village in southern Syria
- Abdin, Idlib, a village in northwestern Syria
- Abdeen Mosque, the main mosque in the Wadi al-Joz neighborhood in eastern Jerusalem, named after Omar Abdeen
- Abedin (crater), on Mercury

== See also ==
- Abidin (disambiguation)
- Zayn al-Abidin (disambiguation)
- Zainal Abidin (disambiguation)
- Vavodin, a village in Mazandaran Province, Iran, also known as Ābedīn
- Aberdeen (disambiguation)
