= Zane =

Zane is a unisex given name and a surname. Its Western usage derives from the Venetian form of Gianni or an alternate spelling of the German and Jewish name Zahn. Zane can also refer to the Arabic personal name more commonly spelt Zain meaning "beautiful" or "handsome". In Latvia, Zane is feminine given name, a shortened form of Zuzanna, with the corresponding name day of 19 February.

Notable people with the name Zane or Zayne include:

== Given name ==
=== Masculine given name ===
- Zane Banks (born 1986), Australian guitarist
- Zane Beadles (born 1986), American football player
- Zane Buzby, American actress
- Zane Copeland (born 1982), American rapper better known as "Lil' Zane"
- Zane Durant (born 2004), American football player
- Zane Eglīte (born 1984), Latvian basketball player
- Zayne Emory (born 1998), American actor
- Zane Ford, American professional pickleball player
- Zane Floyd (born 1976), American murderer
- Zane Frazier (born 1966), American martial artist
- Zane Gonzalez (born 1995), American football player
- Zane Green (born 1996), Namibian cricketer
- Zane Grey (1872–1939), American author
- Zane C. Hodges (1932–2008), American pastor
- Zane Holtz (born 1987), Canadian actor
- Zane Huett (born 1997), American actor
- Zane Jordan (born 1991), Zambian swimmer
- Zane Kirchner (born 1984), South African rugby player
- Zane Lamprey (born 1976), American comedian and actor
- Zane Lewis (born 1981), American painter
- Zane Lowe (born 1973), New Zealand radio presenter
- Zane Maloney (born 2003), Barbadian racing driver
- Zane McIntyre (born 1992), American ice hockey player
- Zane Musa (1979–2015), American saxophonist
- Zane Navratil (born 1995), American professional pickleball player
- Zane Radcliffe (born 1969), British writer
- Zane Reynosa (born 1975), American hip hop artist and fashion designer known as Zane One
- Zane Robertson (born 1989), New Zealand runner
- Zane Schwenk (born 1975), American wakeboarder
- Zane Scotland (born 1982), British golfer
- Zane Smith (baseball) (born 1960), American baseball player
- Zane Smith (born 1999), American stock car racing driver
- Zane Steckler (born 2000), American rapper known as "Sematary"
- Zane Tamane (born 1983), Latvian basketball player
- Zane Taylor (footballer) (born 1957), Australian rules footballer for Geelong and Southport
- Zane Taylor (American football) (born 1988), American football center
- Zane Timpson (1995–2021), American artist and skateboarder
- Zane Tetavano (born 1990), Australian rugby league player
- Zane Williams (born 1977), American country music singer
- Zane Winslade (born 1983), New Zealand rugby player

=== Feminine given name ===
- Zane Eglīte (born 1984), Latvian basketball player
- Zane Jākobsone (born 1985), Latvian basketball player
- Zane Kaluma (born 2004), Latvian luger
- Zane Tamane (born 1983), Latvian basketball player
- Zane Skujiņa-Rubene (born 1993), Latvian politician
- Zane Vaļicka (born 1973), Latvian dancer, model and beauty pageant titleholder

== Surname ==
- The pioneer Zane family in the United States, which includes:
  - Robert Zane, English Quaker ancestor of P. Zane Grey, who came to the North American colonies in 1673
  - Ebenezer Zane (1747–1811), American pioneer, founder of Zanesville, Ohio
  - Betty Zane (1759–1823), sister of Ebenezer
- Alex Zane (born 1979), British television and radio presenter
- Arnie Zane (1947–1988), American dancer and choreographer
- Billy Zane (born 1966), American actor
- Carolyn Zane (born 1958), American romance novelist
- Charles S. Zane (1831–1915), American judge and first chief justice of the Utah Supreme Court
- Clayton Zane (born 1977), Australian soccer player
- Frank Zane (born 1942), American bodybuilder and teacher
- Gheorghe Zane (1897–1978), Romanian economist
- Joe Zane (born 1971), American artist
- John Maxcy Zane (1863–1937), American lawyer
- John Peder Zane (born 1962), American journalist
- Lisa Zane (born 1961), American actress
- Matt Zane (born 1974), American musician
- Matteo Zane (died 1605), Patriarch of Venice from 1600 to 1605
- Randolph Zane (1887–1918), American marine
- Raymond Zane (born 1939), American politician

== Pseudonyms ==
- Zane, a pseudonym of Kristina Laferne Roberts, American author of erotic fiction novels

== Characters ==
- Zane (Ninjago), a character in Ninjago
- Zane Cobriana, in The Kiesha'ra novels by Amelia Atwater-Rhodes
- Zane Donovan, in the American television series Eureka
- Zane Park, in Degrassi: The Next Generation
- Zane Truesdale, in the Yu-Gi-Oh! GX anime and manga series
- Zane Yama, in the Marvel Comics universe
- Zayne Carrick, in the Star Wars: Knights of the Old Republic comics

== Related ==
- Zanesville (disambiguation)
- Zane's Trace
- Zane's Tracts

== See also ==
- Zane (disambiguation)
- Zain (disambiguation)
- Zayin
