= Zainal Abidin =

Zayn al-Abidin (also spelled Zeynel Abidin, Zainal Abidin or Zeynelabidin) may refer to:

- Ali ibn Husayn Zayn al-Abidin (657–713), great-grandson of Muhammad
- Zain-ul-Abidin (reigned 1420–1470), Eighth Sultan of Kashmir
- Mohd Zaiza Zainal Abidin (born 1986), Malaysian footballer
- Zainal Abidin (governor), former Governor of North Sumatra
- Zainal Abidin of Ternate (reigned 1486–1500), first Sultan of Ternate
- Zainal Abidin III of Terengganu (1866–1918), Monarch of Terengganu
- Zainal Abidin Abdul Malik (1967–1996), Singaporean murderer
- Zayn al-Abidin bin Ali (1936–2019), second president of Tunisia
- Zainal Abidin Ahmad (politician) (1939–2010), Malaysian politician
- Zainal Abidin Ahmad (writer) (1895–1973), Malaysian writer
- Zainal Abidin (actor) (1928–2000), Indonesian actor
- Zaynolabideen Ghorbani (born 1933), Iranian Shia cleric
- Zeynel Abidin Erdem (born 1944), Turkish business tycoon
- Zeynelabidîn Zinar (born 1953), Kurdish writer and researcher
- Zainal Abidin Hassan (born 1963), Malaysian footballer
- Mizan Zainal Abidin of Terengganu (born 1962), Sultan of Terengganu, Malaysia
- Zulfadli Zainal Abidin (born 1988), Singaporean footballer
- Zayn al-Abidin Razavi Khorram, Iranian politician
- Zainulabedin Gulamhusain Rangoonwala (1913–1994), Indian businessman
- Zainulabedin Ismail Hamdulay (born 1970), Indian cardiac surgeon

== See also ==
- Zainul Abidin of Aceh
- Zain (disambiguation)
- Zainal (disambiguation)
- Zainul (disambiguation)
- Zeynel (disambiguation)
- Abidin (disambiguation)
- Zayn al-Abidin (disambiguation)
- Avul Pakir Jainulabdeen Abdul Kalam (1931–2015), 11th President of India
