= Abidin =

Abidin, Abadin, or Abdin is both an Arabic male given name and surname, meaning "worshippers". Notable people with the name include:

== Given name ==
- Abidin Dino (1913–1993), Turkish artist and painter
- Abidin Abdul Rashid (1939–2010), Bruneian politician
- Abidin Ahmad, Bruneian military officer
- Zeynel Abidin Erdem, Turkish business tycoon
- Abidin Bey, governor of Dongola
- Abedin Dino, Cham Albanian nationalist

== Surname ==
- Ibn Abidin, Hanafi Sunni Islamic scholar
- Richard Abidin, American psychologist
- Zayn al-Abidin, great-grandson of Muhammad
- Zain-ul-Abidin, sultan of Kashmir
- Zainal Abidin III of Terengganu, Monarch of Terengganu
- Zulfadli Zainal Abidin, Singaporean footballer
- Mahmoud Ahmed Abdin, Egyptian fencer
- Avul Pakir Jainulabdeen Abdul Kalam (1931–2015), 11th President of India

== Places ==
- Tur Abdin, hilly region of Turkey
- Abdin, Daraa Governorate, a village in southern Syria
- Abdin, Idlib, a village in northwestern Syria
- Abdin, Lebanon, a village in Lebanon
- Abdeen Palace, palace in Cairo, Egypt

== See also ==
- Abdeen (disambiguation), variant romanization of this word
- Abedin (disambiguation)
- Zayn al-Abidin (disambiguation)
- Zainal Abidin (disambiguation)
