= Zeynel =

Zeynel is a Turkish given name. Notable people with the name include:

- Zeynel Abidin Erdem, Turkish business tycoon
- Zeynel A. Karcioglu, Turkish scientist
- Zeynel Mungan, Turkish scientist
- Zeynelabidin Zinar, Kurdish writer and researcher

== See also ==
- Zain (disambiguation)
- Abidin (disambiguation)
- Zainal (disambiguation)
- Zainal Abidin (disambiguation)
