= Zain (name) =

Zain or Zayn is an Arabic personal name meaning "beautiful" or "handsome". Zayyan is a variation of Zain.

It is also used as an alternate spelling of the Jewish and German name Zahn.

== Title ==
- Tunku Zain Al-'Abidin, (born 1982), more popularly known as Tunku 'Abidin Muhriz, is the second son of the reigning Yang di-Pertuan Besar of Negeri Sembilan in Malaysia, Tuanku Muhriz ibni Almarhum Tuanku Munawir
- Zain-ul-Abidin (1385-1470), the eighth sultan of Kashmir that reigned: 1418–1419 and 1420–1470
- Zain ud-Din Ahmed Khan (1690-1748), also known as Mirza Muhammad Hashim, a Mughal aristocrat from Nawab of Bengal family and the father of Siraj ud-Daulah, the last independent Nawab of Bengal

== Given name ==
- Zain Abbas (cricketer, born 1991), a Pakistani cricketer
- Zain Amat (born 1975), Singaporean trapshooter
- Zain Asher (born 1983), British-born journalist and TV anchor
- Zain Bhikha (born 1974), South African musician, singer and songwriter
- Zain Al Fandi (born 1983), Syrian footballer
- Zain Al Rafeea (born 2004), Syrian actor
- Zain Imam (born 1987), television actor
- Zain Mahmood (1933-1994), Malaysian author and screenwriter
- Zain "Zayn" Malik (born 1993), British singer-songwriter
- Zain Naghmi (born 1996), an American pro Super Smash Bros. Melee player
- Zain Safar-ud-Din (1938-2023), Malaysian cyclist
- Zain Saidin (born 1984), Malaysian actor and a model
- Zain Khan Sirhindi (died 1764), the Mughal Faujdar of Sirhind,
- Zain Verjee (born 1974), Kenyan-born journalist and TV anchor
- Zain Westbrooke (born 1996), English footballer
- Zain Wright (born 1979), Tasmania-born field hockey player
- Zayn-e-Attar (1329-1403), also known as Ali ibn Husayn Ansari Shirazi and as Haji Zayn Attar, a 14th-century Persian physician
- Zayn Abu Zubaydah (born 1971), a Saudi Arabian citizen held in U.S. custody in Guantanamo Bay

== Last name ==
- Ahmed Al-Zain (born 1991), Saudi footballer
- Anuar Zain (born 1970), Malaysian singer, and brother of Ziana Zain
- Fred Zain (1951–2002), American forensic lab technician
- Harun Al Rasyid Zain (1927–2014), Indonesian teacher, economist and bureaucrat
- Maher Zain (born 1981), Swedish singer
- Osama Al-Zain, Palestinian filmmaker and writer
- Qari Zain (died 2009), Pakistani member of the Mehsud tribe, and a leader of a Taliban faction in South Waziristan
- Ziana Zain (born 1968), Malaysian singer, model, actress, and sister of Anuar Zain
- Sami Zayn (born 1984), the ring name of Canadian professional wrestler Rami Sebei

== See also ==
- Zain (disambiguation)
- Zein (disambiguation)
- Zayn (disambiguation)
- Zeyne (disambiguation)
- Zane
