= Zayne =

Zayne and Zayn are alternative ways of writing the given name Zane, as well as romanizations of the Arabic unisex given name Zain (زين), meaning "Beauty".

Zayn and Zayne may refer to:

== People ==
=== Zayn ===
- Zayn Africa (born 1994), stage name of Abdulmajid Aliyu, Nigerian singer-songwriter and producer
- Zayn Alexandre, Lebanese-American film director
- Zayn-e-Attar (1329–1403), Persian physician
- Zayn Hakeem (born 1999), British footballer
- Zayn Kassam, American religious studies scholar
- Zayn Marie Khan, Indian actress
- Zayn Malik (born 1993), known mononymously as Zayn, British singer
- Zayn Rayyan, six-year-old Malaysian child assassinated on 5 December 2023
- Zayn Siddique, American attorney

=== Zayne ===
- Alex Zayne (born 1986), American professional wrestler
- Zayne Anderson (born 1997), American football player
- Zaynê Akyol (born 1987), Canadian filmmaker, producer and photographer
- Zayne Emory (born 1998)
- Zayne Parekh (born February 15, 2006), Canadian ice hockey player

== Fictional characters ==
- Zayne Carrick, fictional character in the comics Star Wars: Knights of the Old Republic

== See also ==
- Zain (name)
- Zane
- Zein (disambiguation)
- Zeyne (disambiguation)
