= Schwenke =

Schwenke is a surname of German origin, where the following persons are known for:

- Brian Schwenke (born 1991), U.S. American football player
- Hans Schwenke (born 1934), German photographer and delegate
- Michael Schwenke (1563–1610), German sculptor from Pirna, Saxony
- Mignon Schwenke (born 1954), German state politician (The Left)
- Nelson Schwenke (1957–2012), Chilean musician
- Paul Schwenke (1853–1921), librarian and book scientist
- Robert Schwenke (1873–1944), German constructing engineer and automotive pioneer
- Uwe Schwenke de Wall (born 1939), German politician (CDU)
- Wigbert Schwenke (born 1960), German politician (CDU), state delegate in Saxony-Anhalt
- Winfried Schwenke (born 1935), German general in the Bundeswehr
- Wolfgang Schwenke (1921–2006), German zoologist, entomologist and forest scientist
- Wolfgang Schwenke (handballer) (born 1968), German handball player and trainer

== Schwenke denotes ==
- Schwenke, Halver, a quarter of the Westphalian town Halver
- Schwennigke, also Schwenke, a river in Saxony, Germany

== See also ==
- Schwenck (born 1979), Brazilian footballer
- Schwencke
- Schwenk, a family name (including a list of persons with the name)
