= Schwenck (name) =

Schwenck is a surname.

Notable people with the name include:

- Cléber Schwenck Tiene (born 1979, known as Schwenck), Brazilian footballer
- Rudy Schwenck (1884–1941), American baseball player
- Sir William Schwenck Gilbert (1836–1911), English dramatist and librettist of Gilbert and Sullivan operas
- Mary Schwenck (born 1778), aunt of William Gilbert, the librettists's father, and godmother to the librettist

== See also ==
- Christian Friedrich Gottlieb Schwencke, German composer, source of the Schwencke measure
- Schwenk
- Schwenke (disambiguation)
