= Yegai =

Yegai or Yegavi or Ye Gavi (Persian: يگاوي) may refer to:

- Yegavi, Izeh
- Ye Gavi, Susan
