= Zein (disambiguation) =

Zein is the name of a class of prolamine protein found in maize. It may also refer to:

== People ==
Zein (Arabic: زين, lit. 'Beauty') is a common Arabic given name and family name. Notable people with the given name or surname include:

=== First name ===
- Zein al-Abidin Ben Ali (1936–2019), Tunisian politician, President of Tunisia
- Zein al-Sharaf Talal (1916–1994), Queen of Jordan as the wife of King Talal
- Zein bint Al Hussein (born 1968), the sister of King Abdullah II of Jordan
- Zein E. Obagi, Syrian-American dermatologist
- Zein Farran (born 1999), Lebanese footballer
- Zein "Tina" Isa (1972–1989), American girl murdered in an honor killing
- Zein Ould Zeidane (born 1966), Mauritanian economist and politician
- Zein Pun (1295–1330), a court official at the Martaban Palace of Hanthawaddy Kingdom, who seized the throne for seven days in 1331
- Zein Sajdi (born 1997), known as Zeyne, Palestinian-Jordanian singer

=== Middle name ===
- Ahmed Zein El-Abidin (born 1943), Egyptian Olympic fencer
- Intisar el-Zein Soughayroun (born 1957 or 1958), Sudanese professor of archeology
- Mahdi Zein-oddin (1959–1984), Iranian major general in the Iran–Iraq War
- Mizan Zainal Abidin (born 1962), reigning sultan of Terengganu and 13th Yang di-Pertuan Agong of Malaysia
- Mohamed Zein Tahan (born 1990), Lebanese footballer
- Omar Zein El-Din (born 1987), Lebanese footballer

=== Family name ===
==== Zein ====
- Ahmad Zein (born 1966), Yemeni writer and journalist
- Ali Zein (born 1990), Egyptian handball player
- Haitham Zein (born 1979), Lebanese footballer
- Hussein Zein (born 1995), Lebanese footballer
- Irfandy Zein (born 1995), Indonesian footballer
- Maha Zein (born 1976), Egyptian squash player
- Mahdi Zein (born 2000), Lebanese footballer
- Marwa Zein, Sudanese film director
- Melhem Zein (born 1982), Lebanese singer
- Rahma Zein, Egyptian journalist
- Saw Zein (1303–1330), the fourth king of Hanthawaddy Pegu from 1324 to 1330
- Zeina Zein (born 2004), Egyptian squash player

==== Al Zein ====
- Ahmad al-Zein (1933–2021), Lebanese Sunni scholar
- Ahmed Al-Zein (born 1991), Saudi footballer
- Ali Al-Zein (born 1949), Lebanese actor and voice actor
- Al-Zein crime family, Lebanese organised crime family active in Germany
  - Mahmoud Al-Zein, nicknamed "the president of Berlin", boss of the Al-Zein clan

==== El Zein ====
- Abbas El-Zein (born 1963), Australian writer and academic
- Abdel Latif El Zein (1932–2019), Lebanese politician
- Abu-Bekir El-Zein (born 2003), German footballer
- Ahmad Ali El Zein (born 1956), Lebanese novelist and journalist
- Ahmed Aref El-Zein (1884–1960), Shi'a intellectual from the Jabal Amil area of South Lebanon
- Johny El Zein (born 1992), known as Zein, Cypriot/Belizean professional footballer
- Judith El Zein (born 1976), French actress
- Kassem El Zein (born 1990), Lebanese footballer
- Najla El Zein (born 1983), Lebanese artist and designer
- Omar El-Zein (born 1985), German footballer

== Other uses ==
- Zein, superhero character in AK Comics
- Zein TV, Arab satellite TV channel, a joint venture between Future TV and Dubai Media City
- The Wedding of Zein, 1962 novel by Sudanese author Tayeb Salih
- Ribat of Zein-o-din, fortress in Iran

== See also ==
- Zain (disambiguation)
- Zayn (disambiguation)
- Zayne (disambiguation)
- Zeyne (disambiguation)
- Zayn al-Abidin (disambiguation)
- Zayn ad-Din (disambiguation)
- Zein Abad (disambiguation)
