= Fandi =

Fandi may refer to:

== Given name ==
- Fandi Ahmad (born 1962), Singaporean footballer
- Fandi Utomo (born 1991), Indonesian footballer
- Fandi Othman (born 1992), Malaysian footballer

== Surname ==
- Ikhsan Fandi (born 1999), Singaporean footballer
- Ilhan Fandi (born 2002), Singaporean footballer
- Irfan Fandi (born 1997), Singaporean footballer
- Mohd Fandi (born 1992), Malaysian footballer
- Reza Fandi (born 1987), Indonesian footballer
- Zain Al Fandi (born 1983), Syrian footballer

== Nickname ==
- El Fandi (born 1981), actual name David Fandila Marín, Spanish matador

== Places ==
- Sheykh Fandi, Khuzestan Province, Iran
