= Zeyne =

Zeyne may refer to:

- Zeyne, Gülnar, a neighbourhood in Mersin Province, Turkey
- Zeyne (singer), the stage name of Palestinian-Jordanian musician Zein Sajdi (born 1997)

== See also ==
- Zain (disambiguation)
- Zayn (disambiguation)
- Zayne (disambiguation)
- Zein (disambiguation)
