= Zayn al-Abidin =

Zayn al-Abidin may refer to:

- Ali al-Sajjad, also known by as Zayn al-Abidin, was the fourth imam in Shia Islam
- Zain al-Abidin (Muzaffarid) (ruled 1384-1387)
- Zayn al-Abidin the Great (1395–1470), ninth sultan of Kashmir who ruled from 1418 to 1419 and then from 1420 to 1470
- Zainul Abidin of Aceh (died 1579), sultan of Aceh in northern Sumatra
- Zaynul-ʻÁbidín (1818−1903) Iranian Baháʼí.
- Zainul Abidin (politician) (born 1948), Singaporean diplomat, politician and journalist
- Zainul Abedin (1914–1976), Bangladeshi painter
- Zainul Abedin (Mymensingh politician) (c. 1944–2014), Bangladeshi politician
- Zainul Abedin (Barisal politician)
- Zainulabedin Gulamhusain Rangoonwala (1913–1994), Indian businessman
- Avul Pakir Jainulabdeen Abdul Kalam (1931–2015), 11th President of India
- Zainulabedin Ismail Hamdulay (born 1970), Indian cardiac surgeon
- Md. Joynul Abedin, Bangladeshi Supreme Court justice

== See also ==
- Zainal Abidin (disambiguation)
- Zayn (disambiguation)
- Zain (disambiguation)
- Zainal (disambiguation)
- Zainul (disambiguation)
- Zainulabdeen
