= Miss Perú 1992 =

Beauty pageant

- Date: April 1, 1992
- Venue: Casino del Hotel Sheraton
- Entrants: 20
- Winner: Aline Arce Santos; Arequipa

The Miss Perú 1992 pageant was held on April 1, 1992. That year, 20 candidates were competing for the national crown. The chosen winner represented Peru at the Miss Universe 1992 and at the Miss World 1992. The rest of the finalists would enter in different pageants.

== Placements ==
Final Results	Contestant
Miss Peru Universe 1992	Arequipa - Aline Arce Santos
Miss World Peru 1992	Distrito Capital - Ingrid Yrivarren Paz
Miss Peru Asia-Pacific 1992	Callao - Mónika Saez Grimm
Miss Teen Peru 1992	Amazonas - Lucrecia Arenas
1st Runner-Up	Madre de Dios - Jessica Tapia
Top 10	San Martín - Evelyn Villagrán; Junín - Brigitte Duffoo; (United States) USA Perú - Angie Shrimplin; Huancavelica - Claudia Ortega; Ancash - Susana Freire

== Special awards ==
- Best Regional Costume - Lambayeque - Giannina Olivares
- Miss Photogenic - Ancash - Susana Freire
- Miss Elegance - Amazonas - Lucrecia Arenas
- Miss Body - Callao - Mónika Saez Grimm
- Best Hair - USA Perú - Angie Shrimplin
- Miss Congeniality - Ucayali - Wendy Sarmiento
- Most Beautiful Face - Distrito Capital - Ingrid Yrivarren
- Miss Popularity - Piura - Roxana Falconí (by votes of readers of GENTE Magazine)

.

== Delegates ==
- Amazonas - Lucrecia Arenas
- Ancash - Susana Freire
- Arequipa - Aline Arce Santos
- Cajamarca - Aracely Villa Contreras
- Callao - Mónika Saez Grimm
- Cuzco - Paloma La Hoz
- Distrito Capital - Ingrid Yrivarren Paz
- Huancavelica - Claudia Ortega
- Huánuco - Betzabé Cacho Habich
- Ica - María Eugenia Barco
- Junín - Brigitte Duffoo
- La Libertad - Ena De La Melena
- Lambayeque - Giannina Olivares
- Madre de Dios - Jessica Tapia
- Piura - Roxana Falconí Suárez
- San Martín - Evelyn Villagrán
- Tacna - Ana Rosa Olórtegui
- Tumbes - Gisela Rodríguez
- Ucayali - Wendy Sarmiento
- USA Peru - Angie Shrimplin

== Trivia ==
- Ingrid Yrivarren Paz withdrew Miss World 1992 pageant, because her visa application was denied by the South African Embassy and for some disagreements about her contract with the national director.
- Jessica Tapia went to Miss Latin America the following year and would enter Miss Perú 1994.
- Paloma La Hoz would enter Miss Perú 1997.

== Judges ==
- Enrique Escardó - Owner of GENTE Magazine
- Irma Vargas Fuller - Coord. of Misses del Perú Organization
- Augusto Belmont - Manager of CELIMA S. A.
- José Rodríguez Banda - Manager of Gloria S.A
- Dr. Max Álvarez - Plastic Surgeon
- Lourdes Berninzon - Peruvian Actress & Miss Peru '75
- Norka Peralta del Águila - Peruvian Designer
- Gisela Valcárcel - Peruvian TV presenter
- Samy Suárez - Cuban hair stylist
- Alberto Beingolea - Sport Journalist
- Jaime Yzaga - Peruvian professional Tennis player
- Fahed Mitre - Peruvian Singer
- María Claudia Zavalaga - TV Journalist & Chica Gente '91
