= Zainul =

Zainul is a given name. Notable people with the name include:

- Zainul Abedeen (c. 659 – c. 713), the fourth Imam in Shiʻi Islam
- Kazi Zainul Abedin (1892–1962), Urdu poet, officer in the Government of the Nizam of Hyderabad
- Syed Zainul Abedin, the Dewan (spiritual Head) of the Ajmer Sharif Dargah
- Zainul Abedin (1914–1976), Bangladeshi painter
- Zainul Abedin (Mymensingh politician) (c. 1944 – 2014), Bangladesh Nationalist Party politician
- Zainul Abideen, Pakistani politician
- Azizan Zainul Abidin (1935–2004), Malaysian corporate figure, president of the Putrajaya Corporation and of Petronas
- Mohd Asri Zainul Abidin (born 1971), known as MAZA, Islamic scholar, preacher, writer and lecturer from Malaysia
- Zahidi Zainul Abidin (born 1961), Malaysian politician, Deputy Minister of Communications and Multimedia
- Zainul Abidin (politician) (born 1948), Singaporean diplomat, business executive and retired politician
- Zainul Abidin of Aceh (died 1579), the seventh sultan of Aceh in northern Sumatra
- Zainul Arifin (1909–1963), Indonesian politician, deputy prime minister of Indonesia
- Muammar Zainul Ashkeen (8206–1954), senior Qari or Quran reciter and Hafiz from Indonesia
- Zainul Abdin Farroque, Bangladesh Nationalist Party politician
- Muhammad Zainul Majdi (born 1972), Indonesian politician, Governor of West Nusa Tenggara
- Zainul Abidin of Ternate, the eighteenth ruler of the Ternate kingdom in Maluku in modern-day Indonesia

== See also ==
- Zainul Abedin Museum, an art museum in Mymensingh, Bangladesh
- Zain (disambiguation)
- Zainal (disambiguation)
- Zeynal (disambiguation)
- Zinal, a village in Switzerland
- Zayn al-Abidin (disambiguation)
- Zainal Abidin (disambiguation)
- Avul Pakir Jainulabdeen Abdul Kalam (1931–2015), 11th President of India
