= Zayn =

Zayn may refer to:

== People ==
- Zain (name) (زين), an Arabic name meaning "beauty" or "grace"
  - Zayn Malik (born 1993), also known mononymously as Zayn, British recording artist and former member of One Direction

== See also ==
- Zayn ad-Din (disambiguation) (زين الدين), an Arabic name meaning "grace of the faith"
- Zayn al-Abidin (disambiguation)
- Zein (disambiguation)
- Zain (disambiguation)
- Zane (disambiguation)
- Zayin, a Semitic letter
- Zayin, the lowest ranking of abnormalities from the Korean video game Lobotomy Corporation
