= Winslade (surname) =

Winslade is a British surname. Notable people with the name include:

- Charlie Winslade (1931–1993), Welsh rugby player
- Glenn Winslade (born 1958), Australian operatic tenor
- Jack Winslade (born 1995), English cricketer
- Phil Winslade, British comic book artist
- Rose Winslade (1919–1981), British engineer
- Tom Winslade (born 1990), English cricketer
- William J. Winslade (born 1941), American philosopher
- Zane Winslade (born 1983), New Zealand rugby union footballer
