= Bombay Mercantile Co-operative Bank =

Financial institution in India

Bombay Mercantile Co-operative Bank Ltd.
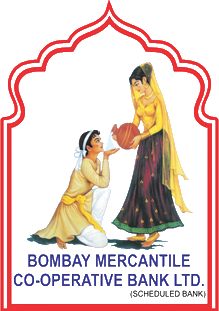
- Type: Urban Co-operative Bank
- Industry: Banking, Financial Services
- Founded: 1939
- Founder: Zainulabedin Gulamhusain Rangoonwala, Shaikh Mohammedally Allabaux
- Headquarters: Mumbai, Maharashtra, India,
- Area served: India
- Products: Retail banking, Corporate banking, Microfinance, Loans, Foreign exchange
- Owner: Members (Co-operative Society)
- Website: bmc.bank.in

The Bombay Mercantile Co-operative Bank Ltd. is a scheduled co-operative bank headquartered in Mumbai, Maharashtra, India. Established in 1939, the bank was founded with the objective of providing financial services to economically weaker sections of society, such as small traders, artisans, and self-employed individuals. It operates under the provisions of the Multi-State Co-operative Societies Act, allowing it to function across multiple states in India.

== History ==
The Bombay Mercantile Co-operative Bank was founded in 1939 by Shaikh Mohammedally Allabaux, a 60-year-old social reformer. He established the bank as a co-operative credit society along with Zainulabedin Gulamhusain Rangoonwala, aimed at financial inclusion among marginalized communities.

Initially functioning as a small credit society targeting the Dawoodi Bohra Muslim community, the institution evolved into a full-fledged urban co-operative bank in 1941. In 1949, it was renamed the Bombay Mercantile Co-operative Bank Limited. Over the decades, the bank has grown steadily, building trust among more than one million patrons and 190,000 shareholders. It has played a significant role in the development of underprivileged groups by financing small-scale enterprises and entrepreneurship initiatives through microfinance.

In January 2017, the Reserve Bank of India imposed a penalty of ₹75 lakh for violations of the Prevention of Money Laundering Act, 2002.

== Operations ==
The bank provides a wide range of banking services with a focus on inclusivity and support for lower and middle-income segments. Its clientele includes small shopkeepers, vegetable vendors, taxi and auto-rickshaw drivers, skilled craftsmen, and small business operators.

The bank offers loan schemes for housing, vehicles, education, consumer durables and foreign exchange facilities for individuals and businesses.

The bank was among the first co-operative banks in India to provide loans for purchasing taxis and to introduce micro-financing schemes for women artisans in weaker sections at Hyderabad and Lucknow.

To promote gender inclusion, the bank operates women-managed branches in Mumbai and Aurangabad, staffed entirely by women

== See also ==
- Co-operative banking in India
- Reserve Bank of India
- Urban co-operative bank
