= Dyslexia support in the United States =

Some charitable organizations like the Scottish Rite Foundation have undertaken the task of testing for dyslexia and making training classes and materials available, often without cost, for teachers and students.

== See also ==
- Learning Ally
- Greengate School
- Landmark College
- The Lewis School of Princeton
- Trident Academy
- Management of dyslexia
- Americans with Disabilities Act of 1990
- Individuals with Disabilities Education Act
- Special education in the United States
