= Zainal =

Zainal is a given name and surname. Notable people with the name include:

- Zainal Abidin of Ternate, the 18th Sultan of Ternate from 1486 to 1500
- Zainal Arifin Paliwang (born 1962), Indonesian politician
- Ahmad Azlan Zainal (born 1986), Malaysian footballer
- Mizan Zainal Abidin, the 16th Sultan of the state of Terengganu and 13th King of Malaysia
  - Sultan Mizan Zainal Abidin Stadium, new multi-use stadium in Kuala Terengganu, Malaysia
- Mohd Amirul Hadi Zainal (born 1986), Malaysian footballer
- Mohd Zaiza Zainal Abidin (born 1986), Malaysian footballer
- Raja Nong Chik Zainal Abidin, the Minister of Federal Territories in the Malaysian Cabinet
- Zainal Abidin Ahmad (writer) (1895–1973), Malaysian writer in the 1940s
- Zainal Abidin Ahmad (politician), Malaysian politician
- Zainal Abidin Hassan (born 1963), former Malaysian footballer, currently a manager
- Zainal Abidin III, KCMG, (1866–1918), Sultan of the state of Terengganu from 1881 to 1918
- Zainal Ichwan (born 1977), Indonesian footballer
- Zainal Rabin (born 1975), Malaysian footballer (goalkeeper)
- Zainal Rashid Muadzam III (1857–1881), the 27th Sultan of Kedah (1879–1881)
- Zulkarnaen Zainal (born 1973), Singapore football player

== See also ==
- Zain (disambiguation)
- Abidin (disambiguation)
- Zainal Abidin (disambiguation)
- Zeynel (disambiguation)
- Zainul (disambiguation)
- Avul Pakir Jainulabdeen Abdul Kalam (1931–2015), 11th President of India
