= Zayn ad-Din =

Zayn ad-Din (Arabic: زين الدين, also transliterated as Zinedine, Zeyneddin, Zain-ud-Din, Zainuddin, Zainaddin, etc.) is an Arabic name meaning "grace of the religion" and may refer to:

== People ==
=== Given name ===
- Zayn al-Din Ali Kutchek (died 1168): son of Begtakin, Atabeg of Erbil and father of Muzaffar al-din Gokbori
- Zayn al-Din Ali ibn Naja (fl. 1160s–1180s), Hanbali preacher
- Zayn al-Din al-Amidi (died 1312), blind Iraqi scholar who invented a method for the blind to read
- Zayn al-Din Azraqi: Abul-Mahāsin Abu Bakr Zaynuddin Azraqi, or just Azraqi (died 1072), Persian poet
- Al-Ashraf Zein al-Din Abu al-Ma'ali ibn Shaban, or just Al-Ashraf Sha'ban (1353/54-1377), Mamluk Sultan of Egypt
- Zainuddin, 15th-century Bengali poet
- Zainuddin bin Maidin (1939-2018), Malaysian politician
- Zinedine Ferhat (born 1993), Algerian footballer
- Zayn al-Din Gorgani (1040–1136), Persian court physician
- Al-Salih Salah Zein al-Din Hajji II, or just Al-Salih Hajji (died c. 1389), Mamluk Sultan of Egypt
- Zainuddin M.Z. (1952-2011), an Indonesian Islamic preacher, da'i, and politician.
- Zayn al-Din al-Juba'i al'Amili (1506–1558), Shi'ite cleric and martyr
- Zayn al-Din Kitbugha: Al-Malik al-Adil Zayn-ad-Din Kitbugha Ben Abd-Allah al-Mansuri al-Turki al-Mughli, or just Al-Adil Kitbugha (died 1297), Mamluk Sultan of Egypt
- Zinédine Machach (born 1996), French footballer
- Zainuddin Makhdoom II (1531-1583), Indian Islamic lawyer and author
- Sheikh Zainuddin, Bengali artist who rose to prominence during the British Raj
- Zineddine Mekkaoui (born 1987), Algerian footballer
- Zain al-Din Muhammad Abdul Hady, or just Zain Abdul Hady (born 1956), Egyptian information scientist and novelist
- Zainudin Nordin (born 1963), Singaporean politician
- Zine Eddine Sekhri, Algerian Paralympian athlete
- Zainuddin Shirazi (c. 1302 – c. 1370), Indian Sufi saint
- Zinedine Soualem (born 1957), French film actor
- Zaynitdin Tadjiyev (born 1977), Uzbek footballer
- Zayn al-Din Qaraja (c. 1279 – 1353), founder of the Dulkadirids
- Zinedine Zidane (born 1972), French footballer and manager
- Mohammad Ebrahim Zainuddin 'Ebbu' Ghazali, or just Mohammed Ghazali (1924–2003), Pakistani cricketer
- Qari Zainuddin Mehsud, or Qari Zain (died 2009), Pakistani Taliban leader

=== Surname ===
- A. C. Zainuddin (1952–1999), Indian actor in Malayalam film
- Bakhtiyar Zaynutdinov (born 1998), Kazakhstani footballer
- Daim Zainuddin (1938-2024), Malaysian economist and politician
- Hamzah Zainuddin (born 1957), Malaysian politician
- Mohamed Alí Seineldín (1933–2009), Argentine army colonel
- Nazira Zain al-Din (1908-1976), Druze Lebanese scholar and women's rights activist
- Raya Zeineddine (born 1988), Syrian sports shooter

== Places ==
- Zeynəddin, village and municipality in the Babek Rayon of Nakhchivan, Azerbaijan
- Aşağı Zeynəddin, village and municipality in the Agdash Rayon of Azerbaijan
- Yuxarı Zeynəddin, village and municipality in the Agdash Rayon of Azerbaijan
- Zeyn ol Din, Fars, Iran
- Zeyn ol Din, Kermanshah, Iran
- Zeyn ol Din, Razavi Khorasan, Iran
- Zeinodin Caravanserai, located at Zein-o-din, Yazd, Iran

== See also ==
- Zeyn ol Dini, Lamerd, Fars Province, Iran
