= Richard Abidin =

American psychologist

- Education: Rutgers University, Rutgers University, Rutgers University
- Occupations: Psychologist; university teacher
- Scientific career
- Fields: Psychology, parent-child relationship quality
- Workplaces: Wilford Hall Ambulatory Surgical Center (1964–1965); University of Virginia (1988–)

Richard R. Abidin is a noted psychologist who has devoted much of his career to studying the relationships between parents and children. He served as founder and director of School/Clinical Child Psychology Ph.D. Program from 1967 to 1979, served as director of the Institute of Clinical Psychology between 1979 and 1988 (professor of education and psychology APA) and served as director of the Curry Programs in Clinical and School Psychology between the years 1988–1995 at the University of Virginia. Abidin retired in 2003; he is now emeritus professor, lecturer and consultant to Curry Programs in Clinical and School Psychology at the same university.

He is a fellow of the American Board of Professional Psychology, the American Psychological Association, the American Association for Applied and Preventive Psychology, and the Academy of Clinical Psychology. Abidin has also served as president of a number of psychological societies, such as the Society for the Study of School Psychology, Society for Child and Family Policy and Practice, Society of Clinical Psychology, Virginia Psychological Association, and chair of the Virginia Board of Psychology.

Abidin has been honored with the Society of Clinical Child and Adolescent Psychology Distinguished Career Award in 2017, and the Abidin Award was established to recognize and support a distinguished early career psychologist.

Abidin has created several assessment measures that aid clinicians in determining the functionality of a parent-child relationship.

He is the author of the Index of Teaching Stress (ITS), the Early Childhood Parenting Skills Program, a measure which assesses the level of teacher stress, the Parenting Stress Index, 3rd Edition (PSI), which identifies parent-child problem areas in parents of children ages 1 month to 12 years in order to identify dysfunction relationships, and coauthor of the Parenting Alliance Measure (PAM), and the Stress Index for Parents of Adolescents (SIPA), which respectively assess the degree of cooperation between parents and the level of stress between parents and their adolescent.

Abidin helped organize in 1967, served on the board of directors and was consultant to Oakland School, Keswick, VA.
