= Trident Academy =

Location
- 1455 Wakendaw Road; Mount Pleasant, SC 29464; United States
- 32.8292°N 79.8542°W

Information
- Type: Private, Learning Disabilities
- Established: 1972
- Principal: Betsy Fanning
- Faculty: 20
- Grades: K-12
- Enrollment: 75
- Campus size: 4 acres (1.6 ha)
- Campus type: Urban
- Mascot: Seahawks
- Website: tridentacademy.com

Trident Academy is a school for children with diagnosed learning differences in Mount Pleasant, South Carolina.

== History ==
Founded in 1972, Trident Academy was known as the reading clinic where a handful of parents whose children had trouble with reading, took the SHEDD training program and learned to teach reading in order to tutor each other's children on Saturday mornings. Each parent volunteered to teach someone else's child in exchange for their child being taught. Instruction took place in a church in Mt. Pleasant.

Interest in the program grew within the community and soon participants were concerned that the students needed more than just Saturday tutorials to be successful in school. The parents received permission from the church to expand their Saturday classes into a school. The goal was to bring their children up to grade level in reading, spelling and math.

In 1973, land for the school's current location was donated by Bill Detyens. The original group of parents, which included local physicians and businessmen, founded Trident Ungraded Academy for their dyslexic children who were not being served by the public and private schools in the Charleston area. Pat Kelly was the first director. Marta Boggs was the Lower School Director and Gail Jeter was the Upper School Director. The K – 2 grades used a Montessori program. Weezie Fallon Bissell taught “hands-on" science, Ed Parker taught English in the High School and Col. Kimbrell was the board of trustees chair.

SHEDD, the initial reading program, proved ineffective for the children's needs. As a result, four of the founding parents, Drs. Margie and Dan Mengedohts and Drs. Aline and Tom Mahan enlisted the help of Dr. Lucia Karnes, a psychologist from Bowman Gray School of Medicine, to join their efforts. Dr. Karnes studied directly under June Orton and her husband Dr. Samuel T. Orton, who is credited with being the “father of dyslexia”.

Pat Kelly left as Director and Col. Kimbrell, assumed the interim directorship. He became the permanent head of school. Dr. Karnes trained teachers in the Orton approach and came every year periodically to test students and help teachers. The school was involved in the beginning stages of forming the Orton Society which developed into the International Dyslexia Association (IDA). Extensive teacher training and professional development was implemented for continuing education took. Dr. Tom Mahan encouraged teachers to attend graduate school and a consortium between the College of Charleston and The Citadel which resulted in the development of a Masters in Special Education with an emphasis on Learning Disabilities. Many of the teachers at Trident were in that first groundbreaking class.

The Orton approach of teaching was used at the school to teach students with dyslexia. This Orton method, subsequently known as Orton-Gillingham, was extremely successful and the school took flight.

The original building included the current office, gymnasium and lower and middle school classrooms. In the early 80's, with the addition of the library and LEAD Wing, the school's enrollment soared. In 2002, the Science and Technology wing was opened creating an expanded campus. In 2012 the school opened a fitness center facility to enhance the use of physical fitness based upon the studies of the transformative effects of exercise on the brain. The courtyard that is located between the two campus buildings is a source of great pride for both the students and faculty.

In August 2013, Trident Academy added a new academic program thus creating The School for Language-Based Learning Differences and The School for Asperger's/HFA. The School for Language-Based Learning Differences continues to educate students with diagnosed learning differences such as dyslexia, dyscalculia, dysgraphia, and ADHD in grades K through 8. When launched in 2013, the School for Asperger's/HFA enrolled students in grades K through 3 with the intention to grow into a K-8 program. In 2014, applications were accepted for grades K through 5. Today, Trident Academy focuses solely on students with diagnosed language-based learning differences.

Today, Trident Academy is 1 of only 14 schools in the United States that is accredited by the Academy of Orton-Gillingham Practitioners and Educators and one of the few learning differences schools on the southeast coast. The school has one Orton-Gillingham Fellow on the faculty and the Director of LEAD, Sheila Costello, sits on the Board of Directors of the Academy of Orton-Gillingham. Students come from all over the world to attend Trident Academy. Trident has educated students from England, Germany, India, the Bahamas, Australia, Morocco, Brazil, and Canada as well from all areas of the United States. The school is a beacon of hope for the greater Charleston area and has a sterling national reputation for educating students who struggle in traditional educational environments.

== Orton-Gillingham Method of Instruction ==
Trident Academy received Orton-Gillingham (OG) accreditation in 2006. According to The Academy of Orton-Gillingham Practitioners and Educators. "The Academy accredits programs that expressly offer Orton-Gillingham training. Programs so accredited are judged to provide appropriate preparation for persons who seek meaningful levels of competency with the Orton-Gillingham approach. Academy criteria for accreditation emphasize the adequacy of curricula used by a program and the preparation and experience of the staff providing the training. Evidence of general support available to a program is also considered. Final accreditation also requires that the instructional leadership of the program be vested in a staff member who has the status of a Fellow in the Academy." Trident Academy has three Fellows on the faculty. Of its members, only Fellows of the Academy have achieved the levels of education, training, and experience deemed necessary to independently train others in the Orton-Gillingham Approach. Summer OG training programs are offered at Trident Academy.

Trident Academy in 2012 received accreditation as a training center for teachers in the Orton-Gillingham approach.

== Students ==
The student body population is approximately 75 students. This number includes students from K-12. Students are selected based on application, diagnostic testing, academic references and a school visit. The school accepts students with average to above average intelligence whose learning disabilities include ADHD, ADD, Dyslexia, Central Auditory Processing Disorder (CAPD/APD), Dyscalculia and Dysgraphia.

== Accreditation ==
Trident Academy is one of 14 schools in the United States that is accredited by the Academy of Orton-Gillingham Practitioners and Educators. Trident Academy is also accredited by the South Carolina Independent School Association (SCISA), Southern Association of Colleges and Schools (SACS), and Southern Association of Independent Schools (SAIS).

== Sports ==
- N/A

== Traditions ==
- Thanksgiving Play and Feast
- Thanksgiving Food Drive
- Toys for Tots
- Holiday Assembly
- Annual MDA Campaign
- Carolina - Clemson Extravaganza
- Oyster Roast
- Field Day

== Notable alumnae ==
- Wallace Scarborough (South Carolina House of Representatives)

== See also ==
Dyslexia support in the United States
