= Oakland School (Virginia) =

Special education school in Virginia, United States

Coordinates: 37.952620°N 78.312214°W

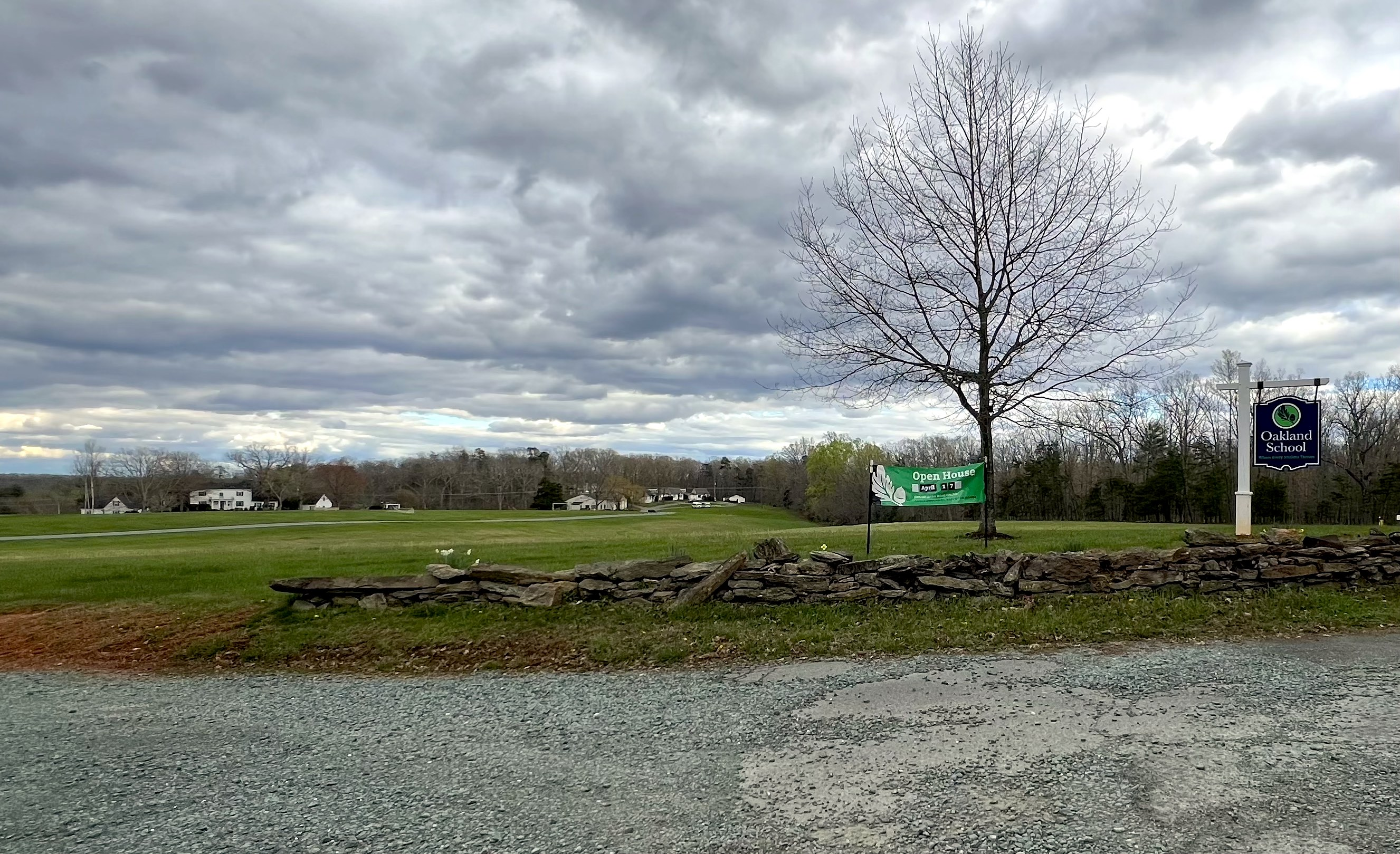
- Troy, Virginia; United States

Information
- Established: 1950; 76 years ago
- Gender: Mixed
- Capacity: 120 (school year); 120 (summer school)
- Colors: Green and navy blue
- Mascot: Horse

Oakland School is a day school in Troy, Virginia, specializing in the education of children with language based learning differences dyslexia, ADHD, and difficulties with executive functioning. The school is ungraded, offering instruction from the early elementary school level through the twelfth grade.

In the fall of 2026, Oakland School extended its academic curriculum to serve students through the twelfth grade, with the first graduating class in 2027.

== History ==
Margaret G. Shepherd founded Oakland in 1950 as a summer camp and remedial school called the Oakland Farm Camp & School and located on her family's farm. Shepherd offered a program that she had created, using phonics to teach reading and offering positive reinforcement to build students' self-esteem. In 1967 she expanded it to a year-round residential school program, and in 1968 the Virginia Board of Education certified the school as a private, non-profit learning disabilities school.

Shepherd taught at Oakland School up to the time of her death at age 91. In 1974 her daughter, Joanne Dondero, succeeded her as school director, continuing in that role until 1993.

Barton Reese, who joined the school staff in 2022, is the school's current head of school.

== Program ==
Oakland enrolls up to 50 students during the school year and offers a five-week, including boarding, summer school enrolling up to 120 students. Students are admitted to the school-year program between the ages of six and fourteen. To gain admission, students are expected to have average or above average intellectual abilities and should not have primary and severe emotional or behavioral disorders.

Each student has a daily one-on-one with a reading teacher, who directs the student's entire curriculum. A multi-sensory, vowel-based phonics program that is similar to the Orton-Gillingham approach is used to teach struggling readers that have not found success elsewhere.

Daily physical education participation is required. Horseback riding is available as a weekly activity and aids in emotional and social development while developing responsibility. Typically, about three-quarters (or more) of the students participate in riding.

== Campus ==
Oakland occupies a 450-acre (1.8 km^{2}) campus. The grounds are dominated by the "Big House," which was built in the mid-18th century and expanded in the early 19th century when Oakland was a plantation. The Big House contains administrative offices. Other school buildings include the Old Kitchen, which was just a chimney when Shepherd first came to Oakland Farm in 1922, and the School House, which was built in 1963. Other facilities include a modern gymnasium and recreation center, an art room and music room, a dining hall and library, and classroom buildings and dormitories.

== School colors and mascot ==
The school's colors are green and navy and its mascot is the bulldog.

== See also ==
- Dyslexia support in the United States
