= Schwenk =

Schwenk is a surname. Notable people with the surname include:

- Adolph G. Schwenk (1922–2004), American Marine general
- Bud Schwenk (1917–1980), American football player
- Fran Schwenk (born c. 1948), American football player
- Hal Schwenk (1890–1955), American baseball pitcher
- Theodor Schwenk (1910–1986), German water researcher
- Thomas L. Schwenk (born 1949), dean of the University of Nevada School of Medicine
- Tripp Schwenk (born 1971), American swimmer
- Zane Schwenk (born 1975), American wakeboarder

== See also ==
- Schwenk's theorem
