= Claire Elizabeth Smith =

British TV host, model and beauty pageant titleholder

Claire Elizabeth Smith (born 1970) is a British television host, model and beauty pageant titleholder who won Miss United Kingdom in 1992. She went on to the Miss World 1992 in Sun City, South Africa, finishing as first runner-up. The winner was Miss Russia, Julia Kourotchkina.

Preceded by Johanne Elizabeth Lewis	Miss United Kingdom; 1992	Succeeded by Amanda Louise Johnson
Preceded by Leanne Buckle	Miss World 1st runner-up 1992	Succeeded by Palesa Mofokeng
