= Roßlau =

Town in Saxony-Anhalt, Germany

Rosslau, Roßlau
- Stadtteil of Dessau-Roßlau
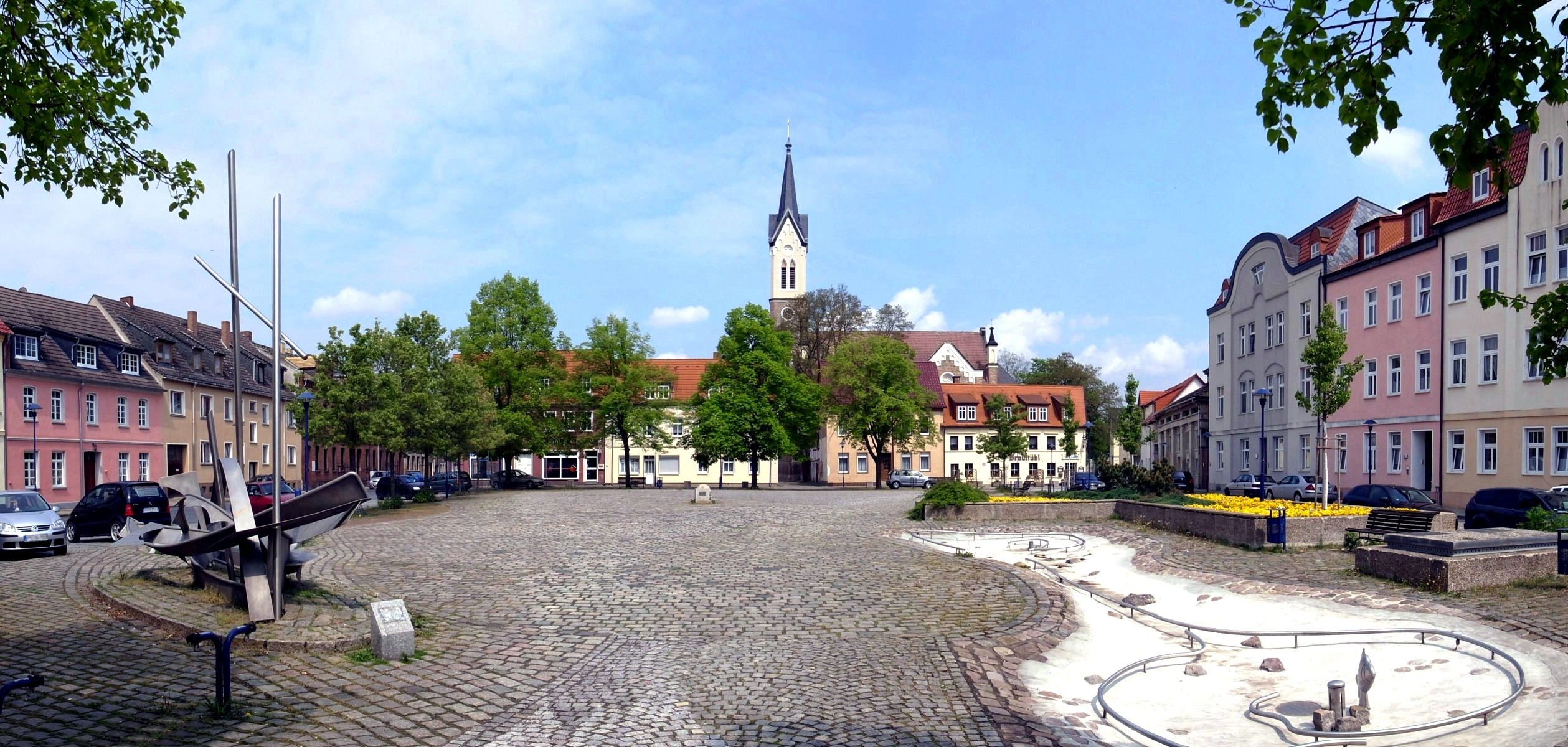
- Market Square (Markt) and Saint Mary church

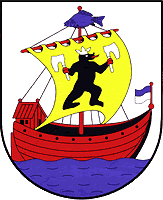
- Coat of arms
- Interactive map of Rosslau, Roßlau
- Location within Germany Location within Saxony-Anhalt
- Coordinates: 51°53′N 12°15′E
- Country: Germany
- State: Saxony-Anhalt
- District: Urban district
- Town: Dessau-Roßlau

Government
  - Mayor: Laurens Nothdurft (BL-RSL)

Area
  - Total: 61.80 km^{2} (23.86 sq mi)
- Elevation: 58 m (190 ft)

Population (2020-12-31)
  - Total: 12,183
  - Density: 197.1/km^{2} (510.6/sq mi)
- Time zone: UTC+01:00 (CET)
  - Summer (DST): UTC+02:00 (CEST)
- Postal codes: 06862
- Dialling codes: 034901
- Vehicle registration: AZE
- Website: Official website

Rosslau (German pronunciation: [ˈʁɔslaʊ]; in German orthography: Roßlau) was until 30 June 2007 a town in Saxony-Anhalt, in eastern Germany, belonging to the district Anhalt-Zerbst. After a fusion with the town of Dessau it became eponym of the newly founded town of Dessau-Roßlau and a quarter of it. Rosslau is situated on the right bank of the Elbe, here crossed by two railway bridges, 3 mi. by rail N. of Dessau and 35 mi. S.E. of Magdeburg. It has a ducal residence, an old castle, a parish church, and manufactures of machinery, paper, sealing-wax, wire goods, sugar, bricks and chemicals. Rosslau became a town in 1603.

== Town merger ==
On 1 July 2007 the town Rosslau (Elbe) was consolidated with the town Dessau. Together they are named Dessau-Roßlau. The mayor of the new town is Klemens Koschig, who was elected on 22 April 2007.

== History ==
The town “Rozelowe“ was first documented in 1215. In 1359 “Dat borchlen zu Rozlau” was mentioned. The name is of Dutch heritage and suggests the foundation and the settlement of Rosslau by inhabitants of the Dutch town Reuzel in North Brabant.

The construction of the bridge over the Elbe River occurred in 1583 and just 20 years later the town was chartered and received its right to hold markets. During the Thirty Years' War the bridge was a scene of a battle. A few years later, in 1631, the bridge was destroyed. Six years after that, imperial soldiers burned down the town; in 1717 the town was in flames again. In 1740 the town hall and castle were built. From 1765-1767 Rosslau was a point of origin for colonial crusades of the Russian Tsarina Catherine the Great, a princess of the principality of Anhalt-Zerbst. In 1806 fleeing Prussians set the Elbe-bridge on fire again. From 1836-1838 Henry, Duke of Anhalt-Köthen prompted the renovation of the deteriorating medieval castle in a gothic and romantic fashion.

In the following years the connection to the network of the Berlin-Anhalt Railway Company, the foundation of fabrics, newspapers and shipyards took place. In 1907 the tramline between Dessau and Rosslau was put into operation.

In fall 1933 the National Socialist government of Anhalt setup one of the early concentration camps in the former Volkshaus in the Hauptstraße 51 in which predominantly members of the Communist Party (KPD) and Social Democratic Party (SPD) were detained and deviled. In summer 1934 the concentration camp was closed. The remaining inmates were transferred to the concentration camp in Lichtenburg. Later on, Rosslau was the location of a forced labour subcamp of the prison in Coswig.

Aiding the town of Dessau in becoming the capital of the district, the town Rosslau (Elbe) became suburbanised into Dessau from 1 April 1935 to 1 April 1946 which gave the town the required number of 100,000 inhabitants. In 1952 the district of Rosslau was built out of the eastern part of the district of Zerbst. This gave Rosslau the status of a country town, which it hold until 30 Juny 1994, before it became part of the Anhalt-Zerbst district.

Until 1991 Rosslau was the base of the 7th Guards Tank Division of the Soviet forces in Germany.

The Elbe-flood from 2002 exceeded the Elbe-flood from 1845.

== Politics ==
Total 11 seats
- Left: 1
- SPD: 1
- NF: 2
- CDU: 2
- BL-RSL: 4
- Heimat: 1

Since its integration into Dessau-Roßlau, Roßlau no longer has a city council but instead an Ortschaftsrat composed of 11 members. It is elected during municipal elections, with the latest one being the 2024 Saxony-Anhalt local elections, and elects one of its members as the Ortsvorsteher (district/borough mayor). Since the 2024 election, Laurens Nothdurft (BL-RSL) has served as the Ortsvorsteher.

The Ortschaftsrat election yielded the following results:

Party	Votes	Share		Seats	
Party	Votes	%	+/-	Won	+/–
Citizens' List Roßlau (BL-RSL)	2,867	39.67	New	4	▲4
New Forum	1,660	22.97	▼9.34	2	▼2
Christian Democratic Union of Germany (CDU)	1,177	16.28	▼11.02	2	▼1
Social Democratic Party of Germany (SPD)	629	8.7	▼2.51	1	0
The Left (AfD)	424	5.87	▼5,85	1	0
The Homeland	325	4.50	?	1	0
Free Democratic Party	146	2.02	New	0	▲0
Total	7,228	100.0		11	0
Valid ballots	2,443	97.49			
Invalid/blank ballots	63	2.51			
Total ballots	2,506	100.0			
Turnout	2,506	71.20	▲23.16		
Eligible voters	3,522				

== Sights ==
The moated castle of Rosslau is very popular location for Open-Air Events and Stage Plays. The annual This is Ska Festival takes part in the castle since 1997. There's also a Country Festival offering Liveacts, Linedance and a Western Casino. The Knight Dinner is a popular event too.

The European village was built after an architectural competition from 1993 to 1996. Architects’ offices from Germany, the Netherlands, Austria, Hungary, Finland and France created the plans and a few conspicuous buildings were built. Other places to see are the "Öhlmühle" (Oil Mill) and St. Mary's City Church.

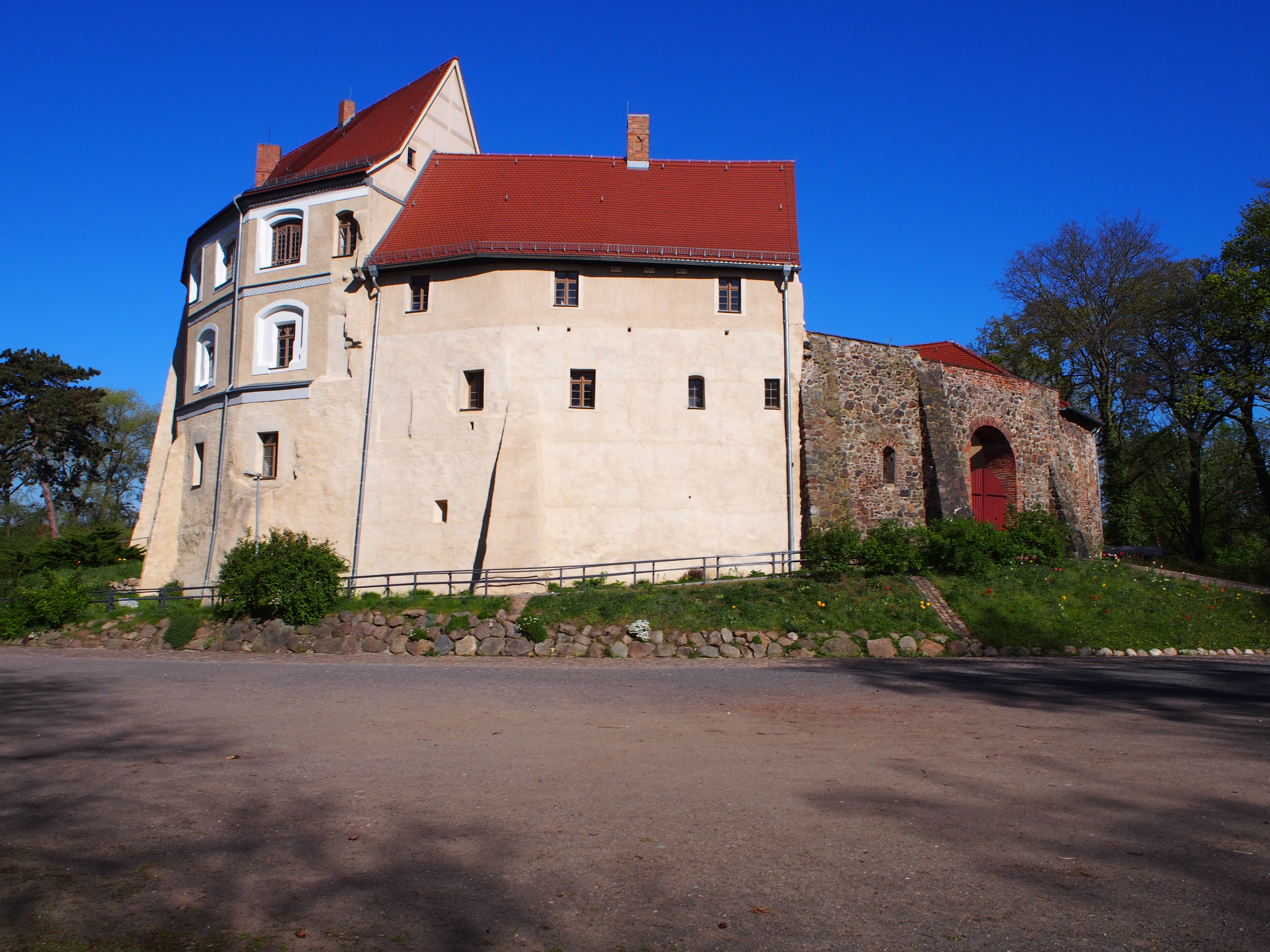
Castle

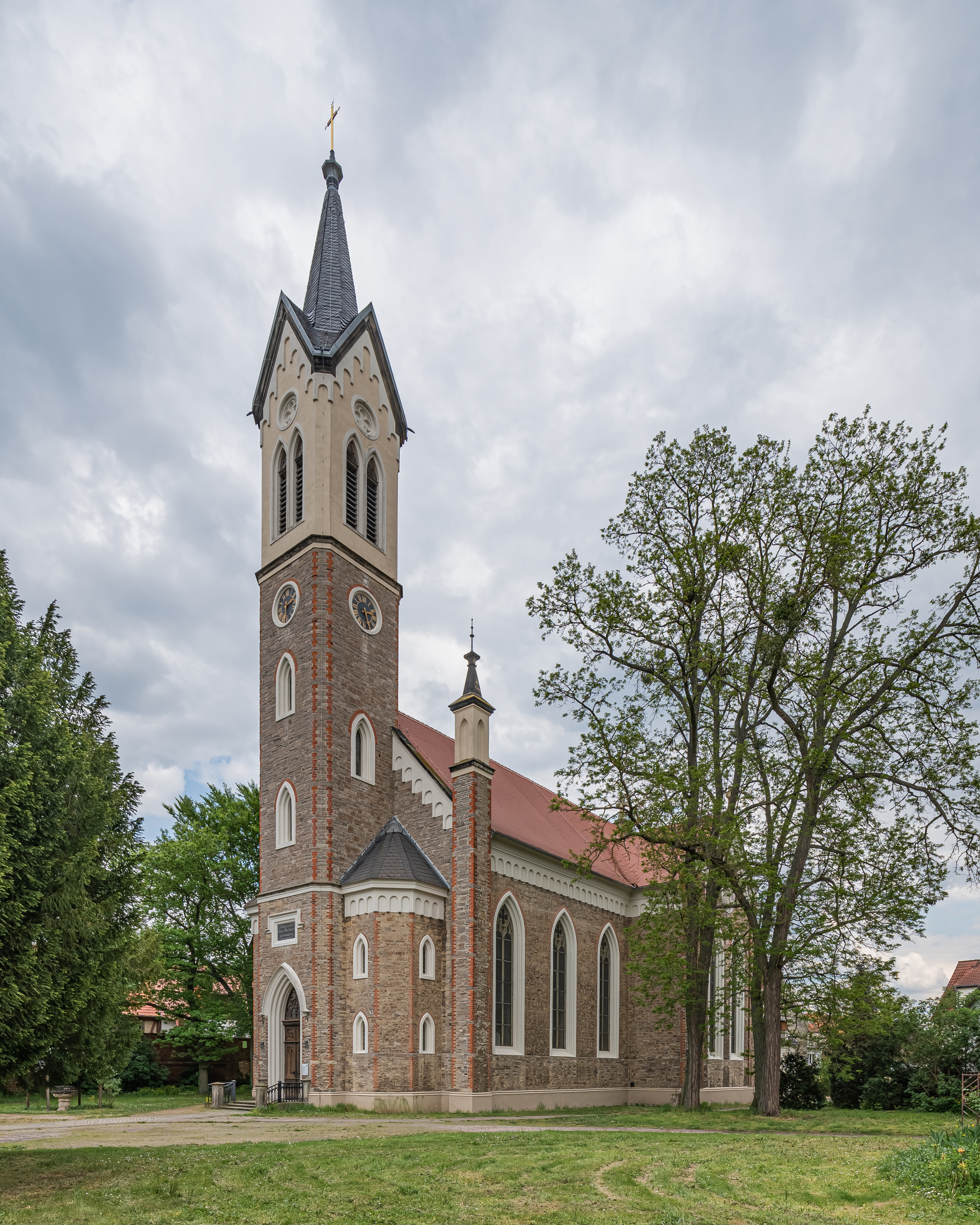
Lutheran Church of Saint Mary

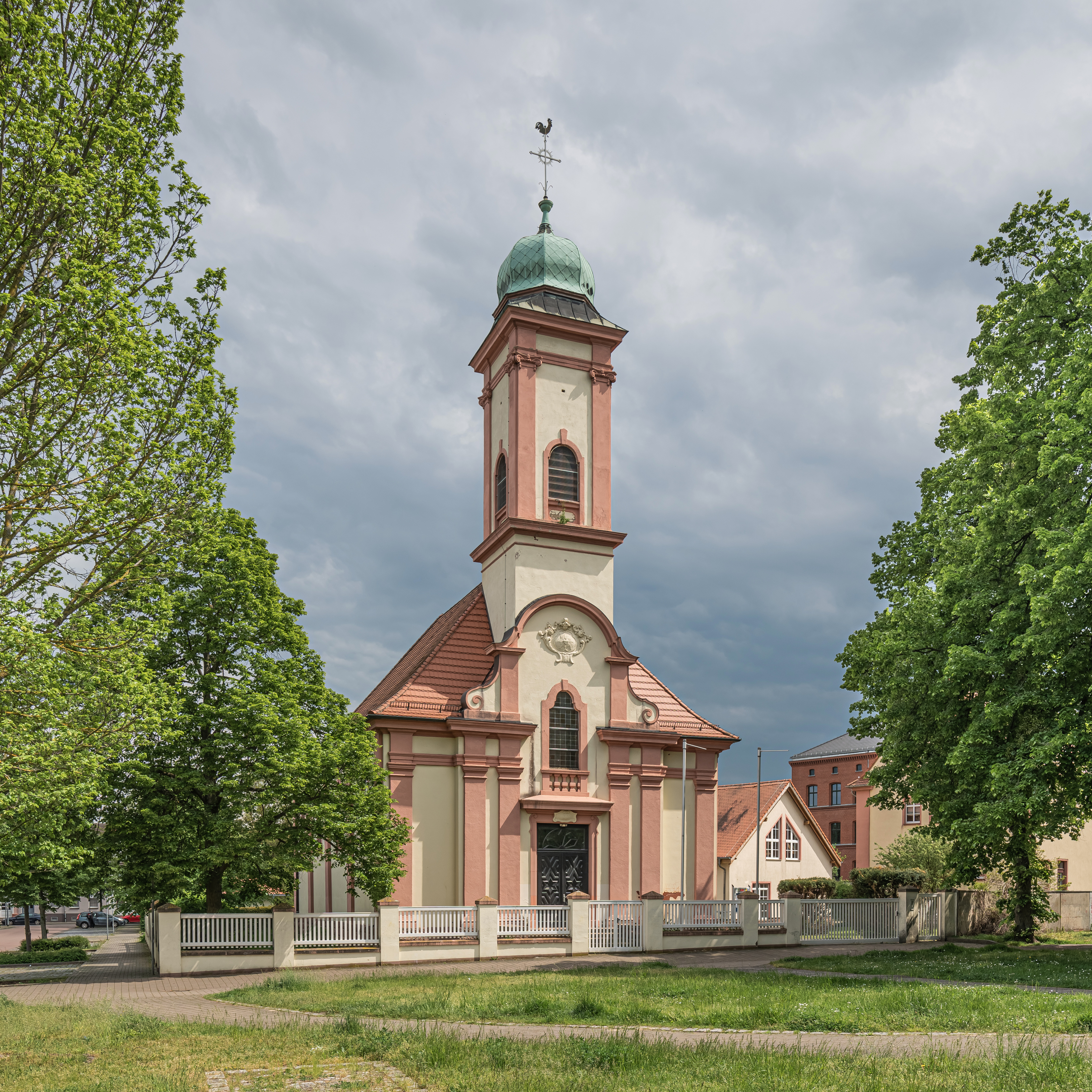
Catholic Church of the Sacred Heart of Jesus

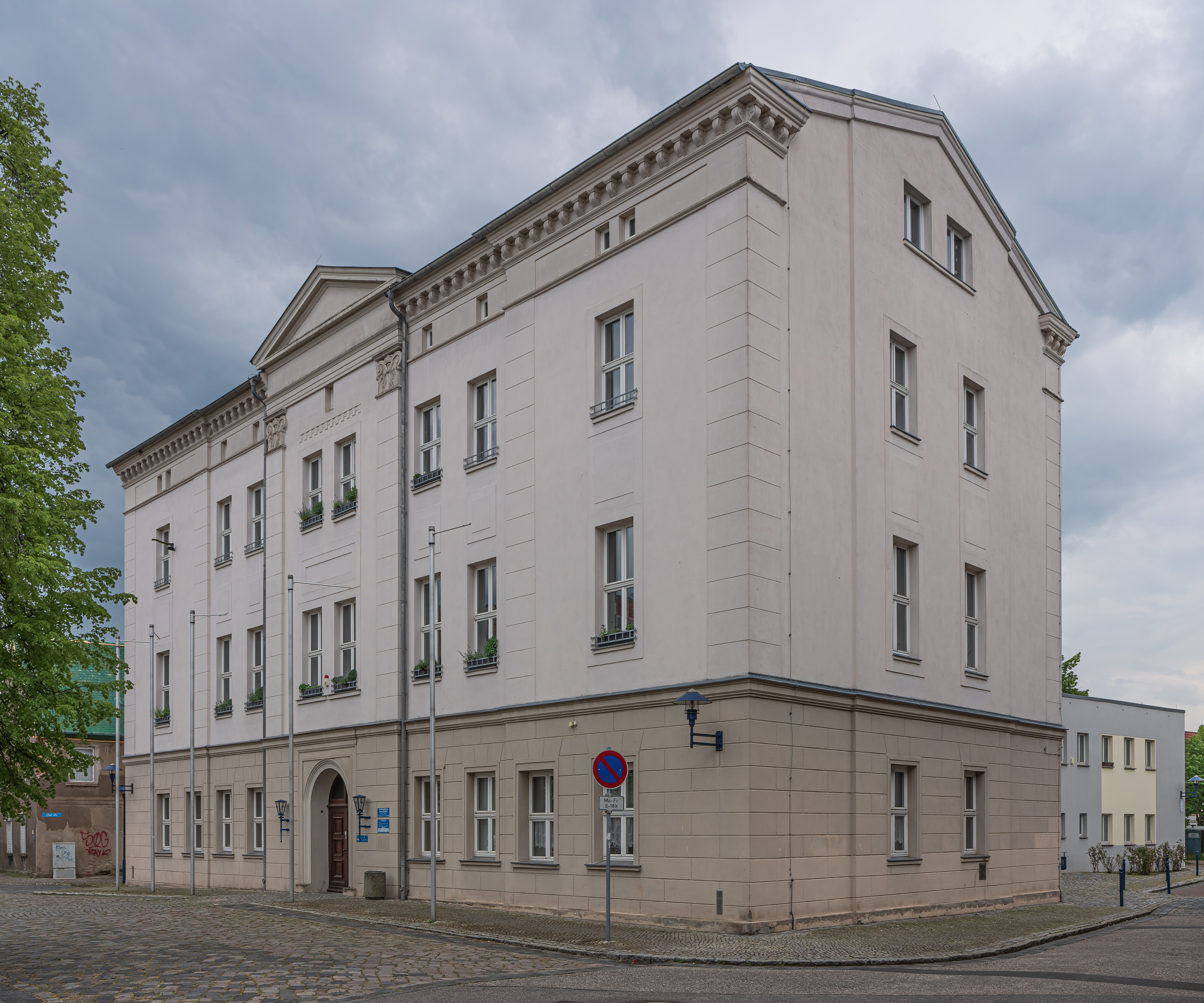
Town hall

== Traffic ==
The "Bundesstrassen" B184 and B187 go through Rosslau. Rosslau also has a main train station with connections to Dessau, Magdeburg, Berlin, Halle, Bitterfeld and Lutherstadt Wittenberg.

== Sons and daughters ==
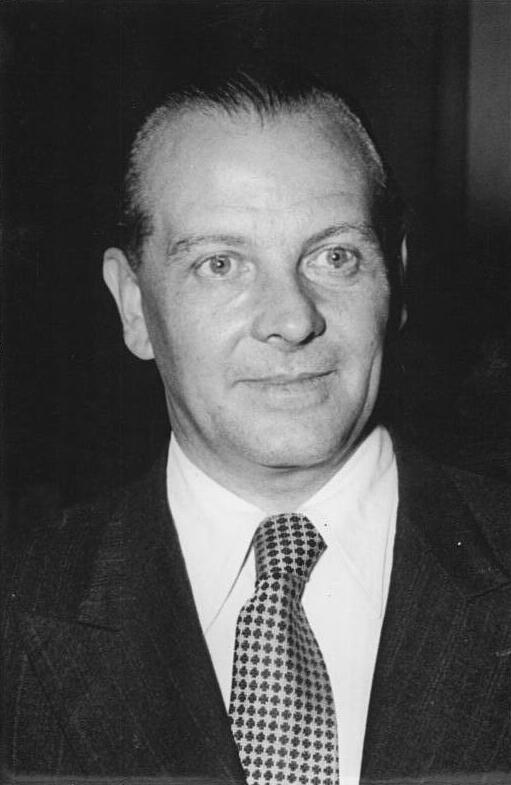
Richard Paulick in 1951.

- Johann Friedrich Naumann (1780–1857), scientist regarded as the founder of scientific ornithology
- Gottfried Bandhauer (1790–1837), master-builder of classicism
- Gotthard Sachsenberg (1891–1961), officer, entrepreneur and politician (Wirtschaftspartei)
- Richard Paulick (1903–1979), architect
- Wolfgang Schwenke (1921–2006), zoologist, entomologist and forest scientist
- Bobby Bölke (1926–2007), actor and entertainer
- Reiner Kontressowitz (born 1942), musicologist
- Günter Dreibrodt (born 1951), former handball player
- Peter Müller (born 1967), German art historian and publicist

== Twin towns ==
- (Germany) Ibbenbüren, North Rhine-Westphalia
- Roudnice nad Labem, Czech Republic
