= Zeynabad, Kerman =

Zeynabad زين آباد
- Village
- Location within Iran
- Coordinates: 30°23′34″N 56°55′05″E
- Country: Iran
- Province: Kerman
- County: Kerman
- Bakhsh: Central
- Rural District: Zangiabad

Population (2006)
  - Total: 43
- Time zone: UTC+3:30 (IRST)
  - Summer (DST): UTC+4:30 (IRDT)

Zeynabad (Persian: زين آباد, also Romanized as Zeynābād) is a village in Zangiabad Rural District, in the Central District of Kerman County, Kerman Province, Iran. At the 2006 census, its population was 43, in 9 families.
