= Greengate School =

Greengate School at Randolph

Location
- 1005 Drake Ave; Huntsville, AL 35802; United States
- 34.706429°N 86.558159°W

Information
- Type: Private
- Established: 2002
- Head of School: Dr. Debbie Hargett
- Faculty: 31
- Enrollment: 33
- Average class size: 4 students
- Student to teacher ratio: 5:1
- Mascot: Greengate Griffin
- Website: greengateschool.org

Greengate School for Dyslexia is a private, non-profit school located in Huntsville, Madison County, Alabama. Established in 2002, Greengate School provides a full-time elementary program for children with dyslexia in Huntsville. Starting with three students in a church, Greengate had 32 students in 2006 and 19 teachers. The school has a 4:1 student teacher ratio and is a member of the International Dyslexia Association.

In 2010 Greengate School received accreditation from the Southern Association of Independent Schools (SAIS), the Southern Association of Colleges and Schools (SACS) and the Academy of Orton-Gillingham Practitioners and Educators (see Orton-Gillingham). Greengate is one of only 14 schools in the country accredited by the Orton-Gillingham Academy for Practitioners and Educators.

In March 2018 Greengate became a division of Randolph School and moved to Randolph's Drake Avenue campus. The Greengate School at Randolph serves children in grades 1-8 and provides dyslexic students a specialized program of instruction that meets their individual learning needs while offering them a full complement of co-curricular and extra-curricular school experiences. Founded in 1959, Randolph is the only K-12 independent college preparatory school in the region.

== See also ==
- Dysgraphia
- Dyslexia
- Learning disability
