= Zeynabad, Boshruyeh =

Zeynabad زين اباد
- Village
- Location within Iran
- Coordinates: 33°59′00″N 57°07′00″E
- Country: Iran
- Province: South Khorasan
- County: Boshruyeh
- Bakhsh: Central
- Rural District: Korond

Population (2006)
  - Total: 11
- Time zone: UTC+3:30 (IRST)
  - Summer (DST): UTC+4:30 (IRDT)

Zeynabad (Persian: زين اباد, also Romanized as Zeynābād and Zainābād) is a village in Korond Rural District, in the Central District of Boshruyeh County, South Khorasan Province, Iran. At the 2006 census, its population was 11, in 4 families.
