= Zane (disambiguation) =

Zane is a given name and surname.

Zane may also refer to:

- Zanè, a town in the province of Vicenza, Veneto, Italy
- Zan, Lebanon, a town in Batroun, Lebanon
- Zane (author), pseudonym of author Kristina Laferne Roberts
- Zane family, a pioneer family in the United States
- Zane State College, Ohio
- Zane Township, Logan County, Ohio
- Zane's Trace, a frontier road in Ohio
- 21991 Zane, a main belt asteroid
- USS Zane (DD-337), American warship, named after Randolph Zane

== See also ==
- Zanesville, Ohio
- Zanesfield, Ohio
- Zain (disambiguation)
- Zayin
