= Zeyn ol Din, Fars =

Zeyn ol Din زين الدين
- Village
- Location within Iran
- Coordinates: 30°35′36″N 52°18′35″E
- Country: Iran
- Province: Fars
- County: Eqlid
- Bakhsh: Sedeh
- Rural District: Aspas

Population (2006)
  - Total: 91
- Time zone: UTC+3:30 (IRST)
  - Summer (DST): UTC+4:30 (IRDT)

Zeyn ol Din (Persian: زين الدين, also Romanized as Zeyn ol Dīn, Zeyn Ed Dīn, and Zeyn od Dīn; also known as Amīr Zeyn od Dīn and Shahrak-e Zeyn od Dīn) is a village in Aspas Rural District, Sedeh District, Eqlid County, Fars province, Iran. At the 2006 census, its population was 91, in 16 families.
