= Zeyn ol Din, Kermanshah =

Zeyn ol Din زين الدين
- Village
- Location within Iran
- Coordinates: 34°41′43″N 47°06′30″E
- Country: Iran
- Province: Kermanshah
- County: Kermanshah
- Bakhsh: Central
- Rural District: Poshtdarband

Population (2006)
  - Total: 368
- Time zone: UTC+3:30 (IRST)
  - Summer (DST): UTC+4:30 (IRDT)

Zeyn ol Din (Persian: زين الدين, also Romanized as Zeyn ol Dīn, Zeyn Ad Dīn, and Zeyn od Dīn) is a village in Poshtdarband Rural District, in the Central District of Kermanshah County, Kermanshah Province, Iran. At the 2006 census, its population was 368, in 89 families.
