= Zane Vaļicka =

Latvian model and beauty pageant titleholder

Zane Vaļicka (born c. 1973) is a Latvian dancer, model and beauty pageant titleholder. She became Miss Latvia and competed in Miss World 1992; however, she was unplaced. Vaļicka competed in Latvia's Dancing with the Stars, with her partner, Oļegs Kuzņecovs.
