= Zeynabad-e Hangam =

Zeynabad-e Hangam زين ابادهنگام
- Village
- Location within Iran
- Coordinates: 28°20′24″N 52°33′49″E
- Country: Iran
- Province: Fars
- County: Qir and Karzin
- Bakhsh: Central
- Rural District: Hangam

Population (2006)
  - Total: 111
- Time zone: UTC+3:30 (IRST)
  - Summer (DST): UTC+4:30 (IRDT)

Zeynabad-e Hangam (Persian: زين ابادهنگام, also Romanized as Zeynābād-e Hangām; also known as Zeynābād) is a village in Hangam Rural District, in the Central District of Qir and Karzin County, Fars province, Iran. At the 2006 census, its population was 111, in 23 families.
