= Zeynabad-e Sangi =

Zeynabad-e Sangi زين ابادسنگي
- Village
- Location within Iran
- Coordinates: 28°41′15″N 54°36′44″E
- Country: Iran
- Province: Fars
- County: Darab
- Bakhsh: Central
- Rural District: Qaryah ol Kheyr

Population (2006)
  - Total: 794
- Time zone: UTC+3:30 (IRST)
  - Summer (DST): UTC+4:30 (IRDT)

Zeynabad-e Sangi (Persian: زين ابادسنگي, also Romanized as Zeynābād-e Sangī; also known as Zeynābād and Zin Abad) is a village in Qaryah ol Kheyr Rural District, in the Central District of Darab County, Fars province, Iran. At the 2006 census, its population was 794, in 169 families.
