= Zeyn ol Din, Razavi Khorasan =

Zeyn ol Din زين الدين
- Village
- Location within Iran
- Coordinates: 36°20′00″N 59°42′23″E
- Country: Iran
- Province: Razavi Khorasan
- County: Mashhad
- Bakhsh: Central
- Rural District: Kenevist

Population (2006)
  - Total: 370
- Time zone: UTC+3:30 (IRST)
  - Summer (DST): UTC+4:30 (IRDT)

Zeyn ol Din (Persian: زين الدين, also Romanized as Zeyn ol Dīn; also known as Zeyn od Din) is a village in Kenevist Rural District, in the Central District of Mashhad County, Razavi Khorasan Province, Iran. At the 2006 census, its population was 370, in 94 families.
