= Zanesville (disambiguation) =

Zanesville may refer to some places in the United States:

- Zanesville, Ohio, population 25,361
  - Zanesville High School
  - The Zanesville Indians, a minor-league baseball team (1944-1950)
  - The Zanesville Infants, a baseball team (1908-1909)
  - The Zanesville Mark Grays, an American football team (1916–1922)
  - Zanesville Municipal Airport
- Zanesville, Indiana, population 602
- Zanesville, Illinois, unincorporated
  - Zanesville Township, Montgomery County, Illinois

Literature

- Zanesville (novel), a 2005 novel

Music

- Zanesville (band) a band from Tampa, Florida
