= Zeynabad, Rafsanjan =

Zeynabad زين اباد
- Village
- Location within Iran
- Coordinates: 30°27′13″N 56°05′41″E
- Country: Iran
- Province: Kerman
- County: Rafsanjan
- Bakhsh: Central
- Rural District: Qasemabad

Population (2006)
  - Total: 272
- Time zone: UTC+3:30 (IRST)
  - Summer (DST): UTC+4:30 (IRDT)

Zeynabad (Persian: زين اباد, also Romanized as Zeynābād and Zin Abad) is a village in Qasemabad Rural District, in the Central District of Rafsanjan County, Kerman Province, Iran. At the 2006 census, its population was 272, in 68 families.
