= Sheykh Fandi =

Sheykh Fandi شيخ فندي
- Village
- Country: Iran
- Province: Khuzestan
- County: Shush
- Bakhsh: Central
- Rural District: Hoseynabad

Population (2006)
  - Total: 804
- Time zone: UTC+3:30 (IRST)
  - Summer (DST): UTC+4:30 (IRDT)

Sheykh Fandi (Persian: شيخ فندي, also Romanized as Sheykh Fandī) is a village in Hoseynabad Rural District, in the Central District of Shush County, Khuzestan Province, Iran. At the 2006 census, its population was 804, in 133 families.
