= Miss World 1992 =

Beauty pageant edition

- Date: 12 December 1992
- Presenters: Billy Dee Williams; Jerry Hall; Doreen Morris; Suanne Braun; Deborah Shelton
- Venue: Sun City Entertainment Center, Sun City, South Africa
- Broadcaster: E!; SABC
- Entrants: 83
- Placements: 10
- Debuts: Croatia; Russia; Slovenia; Ukraine
- Withdrawals: Antigua and Barbuda; Belize; Ghana; Honduras; Kenya; Peru; Yugoslavia
- Returns: Bermuda; Canada; Hong Kong; Seychelles; Sri Lanka; Uganda; Zambia
- Winner: Julia Kourotchkina; Russia
- Personality: Ana María Johanis Iglesias; Guatemala
- Best National Costume: Nina Khilji; Canada
- Photogenic: Ravit Asaf; Israel

Miss World 1992, the 42nd edition of the Miss World pageant, was held on 12 December 1992 at the Sun City Entertainment Center in Sun City, South Africa.

At the conclusion of the event, Ninibeth Leal of Venezuela crowned Julia Kourotchkina of Russia as her successor. It is the first victory of Russia in the pageant's history. Finishing as first and second runners-up respectively was United Kingdom's Claire Elizabeth Smith, and Venezuela's Francis Gago.

== Selection of participants ==
=== Replacements ===
Marina Benipayo was a last minute replacement for original representative Marilen Espino who had to withdraw due to an illness just days before her departure.

=== Debuts, returns, and, withdrawals ===
This edition marked the debut of Croatia, Russia, Slovenia and Ukraine and the return of Zambia, which last competed in 1974, Seychelles last competed in 1975, Bermuda and Uganda last competed in 1989 and Canada, Hong Kong and Sri Lanka last competed in 1990.

Antigua and Barbuda, Ghana, Kenya and Yugoslavia, withdrew from the competition. Melanie Smith of Belize withdrew from the competition due to lack of Sponsorship. She went to Miss Universe 1993 instead. Likewise, Yanina Elizabeth Fajardo of Honduras withdrew from the competition due to lack of Sponsorship. She went to Miss Asia Pacific Quest 1992 instead.

Carole Reding of Luxembourg was supposed to compete but withdrew due to the Miss Luxembourg comitee surrending the pageant's franchise.

Ingrid Yrivarren of Peru was also supposed to compete but withdrew due to visa problems and for some disagreements under her contract with Miss Peru Organization.

== Results ==
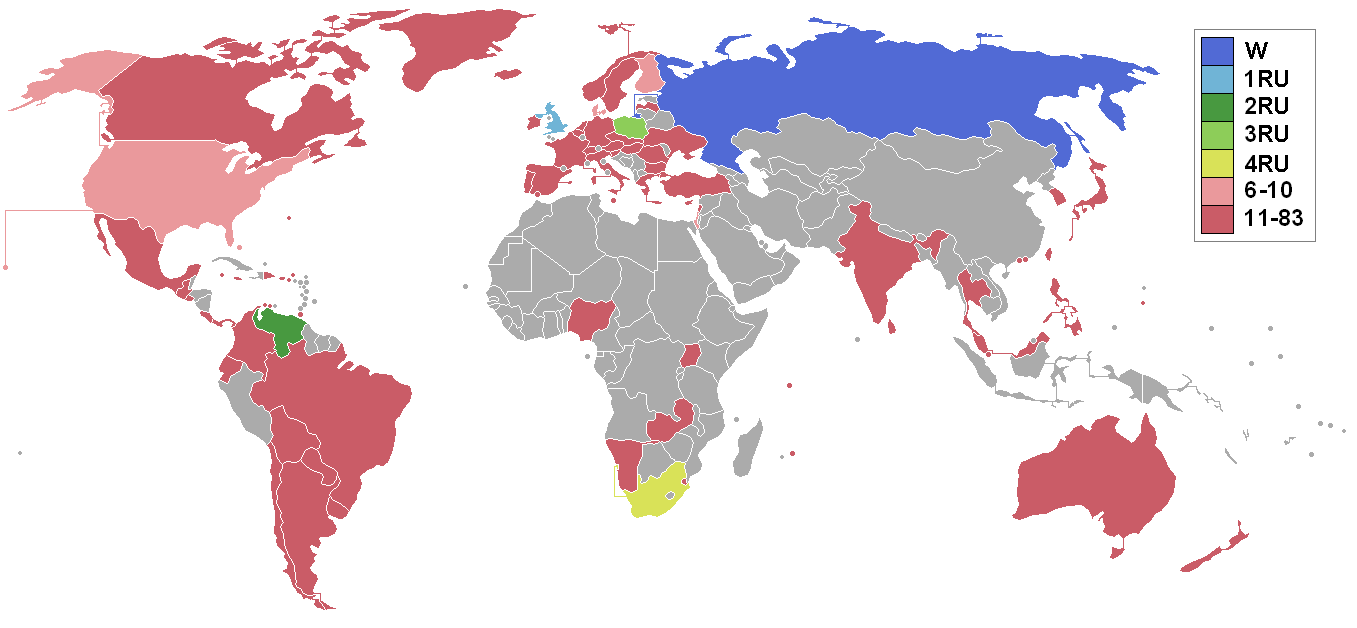
Countries and territories which sent delegates and results for Miss World 1992

=== Placements ===
| Placement | Contestant |
|---|---|
| Miss World 1992 | Russia – Julia Kourotchkina |
| 1st Runner-Up | United Kingdom – Claire Elizabeth Smith |
| 2nd Runner-Up | Venezuela – Francis Gago |
| Top 5 | Poland – Ewa Wachowicz; South Africa – Amy Kleinhans |
| Top 10 | Bahamas – Jody Barbara Weech; Denmark – Anja Hende Brond; Finland – Petra Enrika von Hellens; Israel – Ravit Asaf; United States – Sharon Flynn Belden |

=== Continental Queens of Beauty ===
| Continental Group | Contestant |
|---|---|
| Africa | South Africa – Amy Kleinhans |
| Americas | Venezuela – Francis Gago |
| Asia & Oceania | Thailand – Metinee Kingpayome |
| Caribbean | Bahamas – Jody Barbara Weech |
| Europe | Russia – Julia Kourotchkina |

== Judges ==
- Eric Morley - Chairman and CEO of Miss World Organization
- Anthony Delon
- Jarvis Astaire
- Suzanne de Passe
- Kim Alexis
- Mbongeni Ngema
- Gary Player
- Ivana Trump
- Yvonne Chaka Chaka
- Sidney Sheldon
- Alan Whicker
- Joan Collins

== Contestants ==
| Country/Territory | Contestant | Age | Hometown |
|---|---|---|---|
| Argentina | Claudia Andrea Bertona | 23 | Cordoba |
| Aruba | Solange Noelle Nicolaas | 22 | Savaneta |
| Australia | Rebecca Simic | 20 | Sydney |
| Austria | Kerstin Kinberg | 20 | Graz |
| (The Bahamas) Bahamas | Jody Barbara Weech | 18 | Bimini |
| Belgium | Sandra Joine | 23 | Antwerp |
| Bermuda | Dianne Lorraine Mitchell | 24 | Pembroke |
| Bolivia | Verónica Pino Linale | 21 | Tarija |
| Brazil | Priscilla Maria Furlan | 20 | São Paulo |
| British Virgin Islands | Bisa Smith | 17 | Tortola |
| Bulgaria | Elena Draganova | 17 | Sofia |
| Canada | Nina Khilji | 25 | Toronto |
| Cayman Islands | Pamela Joanne Ebanks | 19 | Grand Cayman |
| Chile | Paula Maite Caballero Fernández | 22 | Santiago |
| Colombia | Wguerddy Alejandra Oviedo Vargas | 20 | Santa Fe de Bogotá |
| Costa Rica | Marisol Soto Alarcón | 19 | San Jose |
| Croatia | Elena Šuran | 21 | Rovinj |
| Curaçao | Cristina Bakhuis | 20 | Willemstad |
| Cyprus | Maria Kountouris | 19 | Nicosia |
| Czechoslovakia | Gabriela Harsanyová | 21 | Košice |
| Denmark | Anja Hende Brond | 20 | Aalborg |
| Dominican Republic | Gina María Rojas Mañón | 21 | Concepción de La Vega |
| Ecuador | Stephanie Krumholz de Menezes | 18 | Guayaquil |
| El Salvador | Raquel Cristina Durán | 18 | San Salvador |
| Finland | Petra Enrika von Hellens | 19 | Turku |
| France | Linda Hardy | 19 | Nantes |
| Germany | Carina Jope | 21 | Frankfurt |
| Gibraltar | Michelle Torres | 17 | Alameda Estate |
| Greece | Evgenia Paschalidi | 20 | Athens |
| Greenland | Laali Lyberth | 18 | Nuuk |
| Guam | Michelle Cruz | 20 | Santa Rita |
| Guatemala | Ana María Johanis Iglesias | 22 | Guatemala City |
| (Netherlands) Holland | Gabrielle van Nimwegen | 21 | Stoutenburg |
| (British Hong Kong) Hong Kong | Patsy Lau Yan-ling | 23 | New Territories |
| Hungary | Bernadette Papp | 19 | Balatonalmádi |
| Iceland | María Rún Hafliðadóttir | 20 | Reykjavík |
| India | Celine Shyla Lopez | 23 | Bengaluru |
| (Republic of Ireland) Ireland | Sharon Ellis | 22 | Cork |
| Israel | Ravit Asaf | 18 | Lehavim |
| Italy | Paola Irrera | 19 | Messina |
| Jamaica | Julie Anne Bradford Houghton | 23 | Kingston |
| Japan | Kaoru Kikuchi | 17 | Tokyo |
| Latvia | Zane Vaļicka | 19 | Cēsis |
| Lebanon | Nicole Bardawil | 20 | Keserwan |
| Macau | Ho Lok-I | 22 | Macau |
| Malaysia | Fazira Wan Chek | 18 | Kuala Lumpur |
| Malta | Noelene Micallef | 19 | Fgura |
| Mauritius | Sarasvadee Rengassamy | 23 | Port Louis |
| Mexico | Carmen Lucía Lehman Fernández | 22 | Mérida |
| Namibia | Linda Sharon Schulz | 19 | Windhoek |
| New Zealand | Karly Kinnaird | 19 | Otago |
| Nigeria | Sandra Guenefred Petgrave | 20 | Lagos |
| Norway | Kjersti Brakestad | 19 | Oslo |
| Panama | Michelle Marie Harrington Hasbún | 19 | Panama City |
| Paraguay | Lourdes Magdalena Zaracho | 18 | Asunción |
| Philippines | Marina Pura Santos Benipayo | 24 | Manila |
| Poland | Ewa Wachowicz | 22 | Kraków |
| Portugal | Fernanda Manuela Santos | 20 | Lisbon |
| Puerto Rico | Lianabel Rosario Centeno | 21 | Trujillo Alto |
| Romania | Camelia Ilie | 19 | Bucharest |
| Russia | Julia Kourotchkina | 18 | Shcherbinka |
| Seychelles | Myrna Chantal Hoareau | 22 | La Digue |
| Singapore | Jennifer Wong | 20 | Singapore |
| Slovenia | Natasa Abram | 17 | Koper |
| South Africa | Amy Kleinhans | 24 | Cape Town |
| South Korea (Note: competed as Korea) | Lee Mi-young | 23 | Seoul |
| Spain | Samantha Torres Waldron | 19 | Ibiza |
| Sri Lanka | Ishara Abelashini Makolange | 18 | Colombo |
| (Eswatini) Swaziland | Candy Litchfield | 18 | Mbabane |
| Sweden | Ulrika Johansson | 25 | Trollhättan |
| Switzerland | Valerie Bovard | 21 | La Tour-de-Peilz |
| Taiwan (Note: Also known as the Republic of China) | Cheng Wei-wei | 24 | Taipei |
| Thailand | Metinee Kingpayome | 20 | Bangkok |
| Trinidad and Tobago | Renée Garib | 20 | St. Joseph |
| Turkey | Özlem Kaymaz | 18 | Istanbul |
| Uganda | Dorothy Olga Mazoe Nampima | 19 | Masaka |
| Ukraine | Oksana Sabo | 19 | Kirovohrad |
| United Kingdom | Claire Elizabeth Smith | 21 | Chester |
| United States | Sharon Flynn Belden | 26 | Coral Gables |
| United States Virgin Islands (Note: competed as American Virgin Islands) | Leah LaTasha Webster | 19 | St. Thomas |
| Uruguay | Leonora Irene Dibueno Fenocchi | 25 | Montevideo |
| Venezuela | Francis Gago | 19 | Maturín |
| Zambia | Elizabeth Mwanza | 21 | Lusaka |
