= Zain =

Zain may refer to:

== People ==
- Zain (name)
- Zain (gamer)

== Business and economy ==
- Zain Group, a Gulf telecommunications company
  - Zain Jordan, telecommunications company in Jordan
  - Zain Saudi Arabia, a Saudi mobile telecommunication company
  - Zain Sudan, formerly Mobitel Sudan, mobile telephone network operator in Sudan
  - Zain Syria, formerly MTN Syria, future mobile telephone network operator in Syria

== Other uses ==
- Zayin, the seventh letter in several Semitic alphabets
- Zain, a mind control weapon from the Strider Manga and NES Game
- Zain Club, formerly known as Fastlink Basketball Club, Jordanian basketball club based in Amman, Jordan

== See also ==
- Zane (disambiguation)
- Zayn (disambiguation)
- Zayn ad-Din (disambiguation)
- Zayn al-Abidin (disambiguation)
- Zein (disambiguation)
- Zainul (disambiguation)
- Zainal (disambiguation)
- Zeynel (disambiguation)
- Zainal Abidin (disambiguation)
