= Zeynal =

Zeynal or Zeinal (Persian: زينل) may refer to:

- Zeynal, Ilam
- Zeynal, Kurdistan
