= Wolfgang Schwenke =

German zoologist

Wolfgang Schwenke (22 March 1921, Roßlau -3 May 2006, Fürstenfeldbruck) was a German zoologist and entomologist.

== Works ==
Partial List

- Vergleichend-biocoenologische Untersuchungen im Waldgebiet des südwestlichen Flämings und seines Elbe-Vorlandes. Ein Beitrag zum Problem der Abgrenzung biocoenologischer Einheiten. (Dissertation.), Leipzig 1950
- Über die Standortabhängigkeit des Massenwechsels der Lärchenminiermotte (Colephora laricella Hb.) und der Ahorneule (Acronycta aceris L.) ... etc. . (Habilitationsschrift.), Berlin 1958
- Zwischen Gift und Hunger. Schädlingsbekämpfung gestern, heute und morgen, Berlin, Heidelberg und New York 1968
- With Peggy Pickering and Mervin W .Larson: Insektenstaaten. Aus dem Leben der Wespen, Bienen, Ameisen und Termiten (OT: Lives of social insects), Hamburg und Berlin 1971
- With Stanley Baron: Die achte Plage. Die Wüstenheuschrecke, der Welt größter Schädling (OT: The desert locust), Hamburg, und Berlin 1975
- Leitfaden der Forstzoologie und des Forstschutzes gegen Tiere, Hamburg 1981
- Revision der europäischen Mesochorinae (Hymenoptera, Ichneumonoidea, Ichneumonidae), München 1999

and (1972–1986)

- Die Forstschädlinge Europas. Ein Handbuch in 5 Bänden
- Band 1: Würmer, Schnecken, Spinnentiere, Tausendfüßer und hemimetabole Insekten, Hamburg und Berlin 1972
- Band 2: Käfer, Hamburg und Berlin 1974
- Band 3: Schmetterlinge, Hamburg und Berlin 1978
- Band 4: Hautflügler und Zweiflügler, Hamburg 1982
- Band 5: Wirbeltiere, Hamburg 1986

Zeitschrift für Angewandte Entomologie Anzeiger für Schädlingskunde
