= Zeynabad, Darab =

Zeynabad زين اباد
- Village
- Location within Iran
- Coordinates: 28°46′33″N 54°20′45″E
- Country: Iran
- Province: Fars
- County: Darab
- Bakhsh: Central
- Rural District: Paskhan

Population (2006)
  - Total: 340
- Time zone: UTC+3:30 (IRST)
  - Summer (DST): UTC+4:30 (IRDT)

Zeynabad (Persian: زين اباد, also Romanized as Zeynābād; also known as Zīnatābād) is a village in Paskhan Rural District, in the Central District of Darab County, Fars province, Iran. At the 2006 census, its population was 340, with 80 families.
