= Yegavi, Izeh =

Yegavi يگاوي
- Village
- Location within Iran
- Coordinates: 31°58′49″N 49°35′05″E
- Country: Iran
- Province: Khuzestan
- County: Izeh
- Bakhsh: Central
- Rural District: Margha

Population (2006)
  - Total: 81
- Time zone: UTC+3:30 (IRST)
  - Summer (DST): UTC+4:30 (IRDT)

Yegavi (Persian: يگاوي, also Romanized as Yegāvī; also known as Yegā‘ī) is a village in Margha Rural District, in the Central District of Izeh County, Khuzestan Province, Iran. At the 2006 census, its population was 81, in 14 families.
