= Zainulabdeen =

Zainulabdeen is a surname and a given name. People with the name include:

- Zainulabdeen Al-Madhkhoori
- Azeez Zainulabdeen
- Naseer Ahamed Zainulabdeen
