= Mignon Schwenke =

German politician

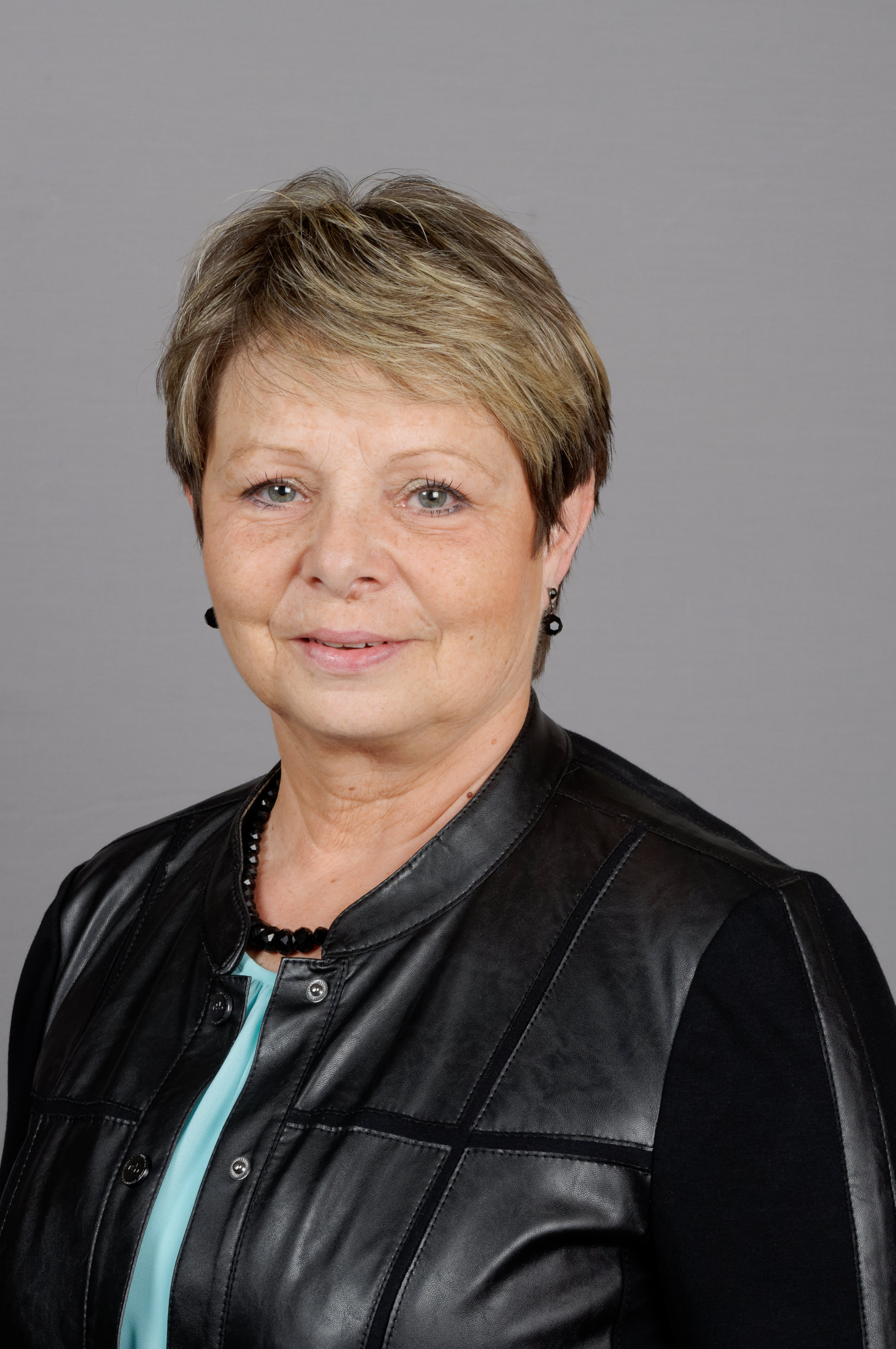
Mignon Schwenke, MdL Mecklenburg-Vorpommern

Mignon Schwenke (born 4 November 1954) is a German politician for The Left.

== Life and politics ==
Schwenke was born in the West German town of Amberg and is a member of The Left since its foundation in 2007.

Since 2011 Schwenke is a member of the Landtag of Mecklenburg-Vorpommern and since 2016 vice-president of the same federal diet.
