= Zeynabad, Kharameh =

Zeynabad زين اباد
- Village
- Location within Iran
- Coordinates: 29°38′57″N 53°03′48″E
- Country: Iran
- Province: Fars
- County: Kharameh
- Bakhsh: Central
- Rural District: Dehqanan

Population (2006)
  - Total: 256
- Time zone: UTC+3:30 (IRST)
  - Summer (DST): UTC+4:30 (IRDT)

Zeynabad (Persian: زين اباد, also Romanized as Zeynābād andZīnābād; also known as Zain Abad Hoomeh and Zeynābād-e Ḩūmeh) is a village in Dehqanan Rural District, in the Central District of Kharameh County, Fars province, Iran. At the 2006 census, its population was 256, in 62 families.
