= Fran Schwenk =

American football player and coach

Biographical details
- Born: c. 1948

Playing career
- c. 1968: Northwest Missouri State

Coaching career (HC unless noted)
- 1971: Eastgate Jr. HS (MO)
- 1972: Northwest Missouri State (assistant)
- 1973–1975: Rock Port HS (MO)
- 1976–?: Clinton HS (MO) (assistant)
- 1979: William Jewell (assistant)
- 1980–1983: Missouri Western (DB)
- 1984–2004: Doane
- 2005–2009: William Jewell
- 2014–2018: Saint Mary (LB)

Head coaching record
- Overall: 136–116–3 (college)
- Tournaments: 1–1 (NAIA D-II playoffs); 2–1 (NAIA playoffs)

Accomplishments and honors

Championships
- 3 NIAC (1984, 1993, 1997)

Fran Schwenk (born c. 1948) is an American former football player and coach. He served as the head football coach at Doane College from 1984 to 2004 and at William Jewell College from 2005 to 2009, compiling a career college football coaching record of 136–116–3.

== Coaching career ==
Schwenk was the 31st head football coach at Doane College in Crete, Nebraska and he held that position for 21 seasons, from 1984 until 2004. His coaching record at Doane was 114–87–3.

== Head coaching record ==
Year	Team	Overall	Conference	Standing	Bowl/playoffs	NAIA^{#}
Doane Tigers (Nebraska Intercollegiate / Nebraska–Iowa / Great Plains) (1984–2004)
1984	Doane	6–4	4–1	T–1st		
1985	Doane	6–3–1	4–1	2nd		
1986	Doane	5–5	3–2	T–2nd		
1987	Doane	5–5	2–3	T–4th		
1988	Doane	4–5	3–2	T–2nd		
1989	Doane	5–4–1	3–2	T–2nd		
1990	Doane	3–7	2–3	4th		
1991	Doane	5–4	2–3	T–3rd		
1992	Doane	5–3–1	3–2–1	4th		
1993	Doane	10–1	6–0	1st	L NAIA Division II Quarterfinal	
1994	Doane	4–5	3–3	4th		
1995	Doane	3–6	3–3	T–3rd		
1996	Doane	6–3	4–2	T–2nd		
1997	Doane	11–1	6–0	1st	L NAIA Semifinal	
1998	Doane	5–4	4–2	2nd		
1999	Doane	7–3	4–2	2nd		15
2000	Doane	5–4	5–3	T–3rd		
2001	Doane	6–3	5–3	4th		
2002	Doane	7–3	6–2	T–2nd		17
2003	Doane	4–6	4–6	T–7th		
2004	Doane	2–8	2–8	9th		
Doane:		114–87–3	78–53–1			
William Jewell Cardinals (Heart of America Athletic Conference) (2005–2009)
2005	William Jewell	6–4	6–4	T–5th		
2006	William Jewell	5–5	5–5	T–5th		
2007	William Jewell	6–4	6–4	T–4th		
2008	William Jewell	4–7	4–6	T–6th		
2009	William Jewell	1–9	1–9	10th		
William Jewell:		22–29	22–28			
Total:		136–116–3				
National championship Conference title Conference division title or championship game berth
