= Zane Winslade =

- Born: Zane Winslade; 17 April 1983 (age 43) New Zealand
- Height: 6 ft 0 in (1.83 m)
- Weight: 17 st 1 lb (108 kg)

Rugby union career
- Position: Back row
Senior career
Years	Team	Apps	(Points)
2006–	Tasman Makos	18	(0)

Zane Winslade (born 17 April 1983) is a New Zealand rugby union footballer. A back row, was formerly playing for București Oaks in the European Challenge Cup.

Zane Winslade played for the Tasman Makos in the Air New Zealand Cup from 2006 till 2009.

He was an openside flanker that ran and tackled hard. He played for Bucuresti Oaks, London Scottish and SLB Benfica rugby in Lisbon, Portugal. He has now returned to New Zealand and works as a Mental Skills Coach
