= Abdin, Daraa Governorate =

Abdin عابدين
- Village
- Location within Syria
- Coordinates: 32°46′46″N 35°49′27″E
- Grid position: 227/242 PAL
- Country: Syria
- Governorate: Daraa
- District: Daraa
- Subdistrict: Shajara

Population (2004 census)
  - Total: 1,454
- Time zone: UTC+3 (AST)

Abdin (Arabic: عابدين, romanized: ʿAbdīn, also transliterated Abdeen or Abidin) is a village in southern Syria, administratively part of the Daraa Governorate, located west of Daraa. According to the Syria Central Bureau of Statistics, Abdin had a population of 1,454 in the 2004 census. The village was listed in 16th-century Ottoman tax records. It was abandoned at an unknown point and reestablished by Algerian immigrants associated with the exiled Algerian resistance leader Emir Abdelkader in the mid-19th century.

== History ==
=== Ottoman period ===
In 1596, Abdin appeared in the Ottoman tax registers as part of the nahiya (subdistrict) of Jawlan Sharqi in the Qada of Hauran. It had an all Muslim population consisting of 12 households and 8 bachelors. A fixed tax−rate of 25% was paid on wheat (7,050 akçe), barley (3,150 a.), summer crops (1,890 a.), goats and/or beehives (500), in addition to taxes on a water mill (30 a.) and occasional revenues (500 a.); a total of 13,000 akçe.

Beginning in 1847, waves of Algerians, particularly those associated with the anti-colonial leader Abdelkader al-Djezairi, escaping persecution, war or hardships under French rule in their country arrived in Ottoman Syria. During this first wave (1847–1860), many of the Algerian immigrants were allocated lands by the Ottoman authorities in the Hauran plain and Jabal Ajlun hills. Among the villages they settled was Abdin.

In the 1880s, Gottlieb Schumacher noted Abdin was a medium-sized village of 150 inhabitants. Its thirty-six huts were built of stone or mud. The village water was supplied by a nearby spring and the lands around it were fertile and cultivated. The sheikh of Abdin had an ancient basaltic block inscribed in Greek in the grounds of his home. In the village's vicinity was a ruined mosque, which Schumacher called Jami' Abdin, abutted by a square tower measuring about 12 feet (3.7 m) high and well-built of basaltic blocks.

Around 1927, between 150 and 200 Algerians from the village of Sha'ara near Tiberias were resettled in Abdin after their village was sold by Abdelkader's son, the Damascus-based emir Sa'id, to a Jewish settlement organization.

The Israel Defence Forces entered the settlement in September 2025.

== Bibliography ==
- Abbasi, Mustafa (2003). "From Algeria to the Holy Land: Algerian Communities in the Galilee, from the Late Ottoman Period to 1948". The Maghreb Review: 41–59.
- Abu Fakhr, Sakhr (2000). "Voices from the Golan". Journal of Palestine Studies. 29 (4).
- Hütteroth, W.-D.; Abdulfattah, K. (1977). Historical Geography of Palestine, Transjordan and Southern Syria in the Late 16th Century. Erlanger Geographische Arbeiten, Sonderband 5. Erlangen, Germany: Vorstand der Fränkischen Geographischen Gesellschaft. ISBN 3-920405-41-2.
- Schumacher, G. (1886). Across the Jordan: Being an Exploration and Survey of part of Hauran and Jaulan. London: Richard Bentley and Son.
