= Zainulabedin Gulamhusain Rangoonwala =

Indian activist

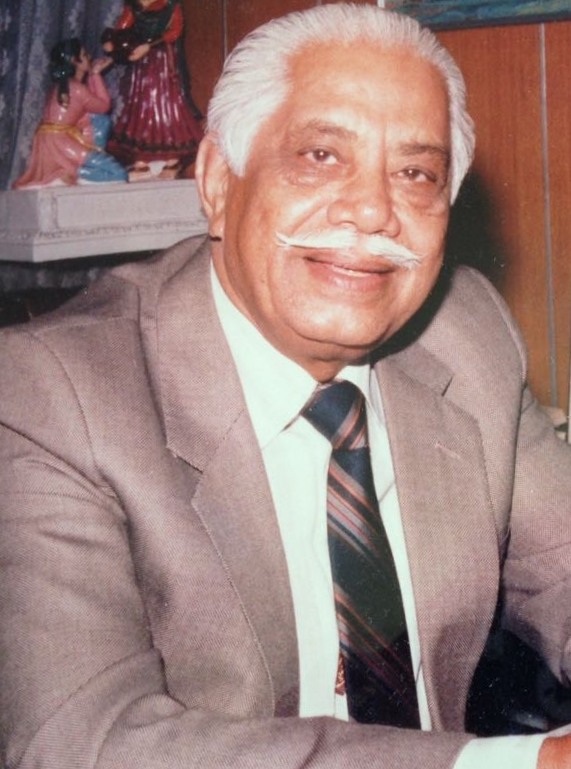
- Born: July 1, 1913; Rangoon, Burma
- Died: May 28, 1994 (age 80); Peterborough, United Kingdom
- Known for: Cooperative Banking and Social work
- Board member of: Bombay Mercantile Cooperative Bank Ltd., Air India
- Awards: Padmashri 1984, Rajiv Gandhi Medal of Merit 1992

Zainulabedin Gulamhusain Rangoonwala (July 1, 1913 – May 28, 1994) was the co-founder and managing director of the Bombay Mercantile Co-operative Bank. This became one of the largest cooperative banks in India and also in Asia.

== Early life and career ==
Born on 1 July 1913 in Rangoon, Burma and orphaned at the age of twelve, Rangoonwala had his early education at a boarding school and after matriculation joined Davar's College for acquiring necessary knowledge in banking, co-operation and accountancy. He started his career with the Central Bank of India – under the guidance of Sir Sorabji Pochkhanawala who trained and mentored him in practical banking.

The experience of seven years with Central Bank of India brought him closer to the operations and functioning of various banks. He was convinced that though the commercial banks mobilised deposits from all, including the hard-earned savings of the poor masses, they served the interest of a few business houses. He observed that the banks neglected their socio-economic obligations towards the common man and only catered to the financial needs of the elite. Moved with the exploitation of the masses by the then capitalist society, he determined to establish a bank "of the people, for the people, by the people".

Way back in 1939, the country was passing through major disruptions with the struggle for Independence and the "Quit India movement" gaining momentum. The end of British rule appeared almost certain. With this background he realised that establishing a Commercial Bank would not achieve his objective of Gandhian "Swaraj", but rather aggravate the imbalances between the "haves" and the "have-nots". Rangoonwala felt that the real solution to the problem of freedom from slavery did not depend on the exit of the British alone, but in the economic emancipation of the masses at large. Thus he pledged to serve the poor taxiwalas, small shopkeepers, petty traders and artisans who had no tangible securities to offer except their sincere and dedicated zeal to uplift their present lot. Finding his strength in the neglected masses he made a humble beginning by establishing a Cooperative Credit Society on 2 June 1939 with a meagre paid-up Share Capital of Rs. 10,600/- and with the patronage and help of Khan Bahadur Shaikh Mohamedally Allahu the founder Chairman of the Bank.

Initially, Rangoonwala was a one-man band, having to perform many different functions from cleaner, negotiator and clerk to accountant and scribe, for in the infant stage of the Society it did not have resources to employ paid workers. By the end of the second year, Rangoonwala's efforts bore results and the society showed promises of growth. The share capital of the bank gradually increased, encouraging Rangoonwala to convert the credit society into an Urban Cooperative Bank and on 14 February 1941, Bombay Muslim Cooperative Bank was formed. The bank functioned based on the principles of Islamic economics, being less dependent on interest and having more of a vested interest in the business models of the ventures it supported.

After independence, India adopted a secular and socialist pattern of society. Rangoonwala, a firm follower of Gandhian principles and a true patriot was the first to open the doors of the Cooperative bank to all citizens of the country, irrespective of caste, creed and religion. Accordingly, the Bombay Muslim Cooperative Bank was renamed as Bombay Mercantile Cooperative Bank on 11 November 1949, to establish a secular character. Since then the bank grew rapidly, and now has 52 branches all over India. The bank was the first urban cooperative bank in Mumbai and now has over a million patrons and 190,000 share holders, the vast majority of which belong to the lower middle class. The bank continues its focus of socioeconomic development in the marginalized communities where it gained credibility, promoting artisans, women entrepreneurs, self-employment schemes and micro-financing.

== Philanthropy ==
Rangoonwala, both privately and through the bank, was a regular contributor to many charitable organisations. He coordinated efforts with the Prime Ministers relief funds whenever calamities had befallen different parts of India and brought healthcare to villages where it was previously unheard of. The bank was able to establish a medical centre equipped with X-ray machines and gave free medicines and treatments to the local population through the collaboration with the government medical colleges. The head office was also named the Zain G Rangoonwala building in recognition of his dedication to the field of cooperative banking.

As a banker, Rangoonwala came into contact with a broad cross-section of society but his efforts were mainly directed to help the poor. This was reflected in the many schemes and programs he established to improve the lot of the common man.

== Padma shri ==
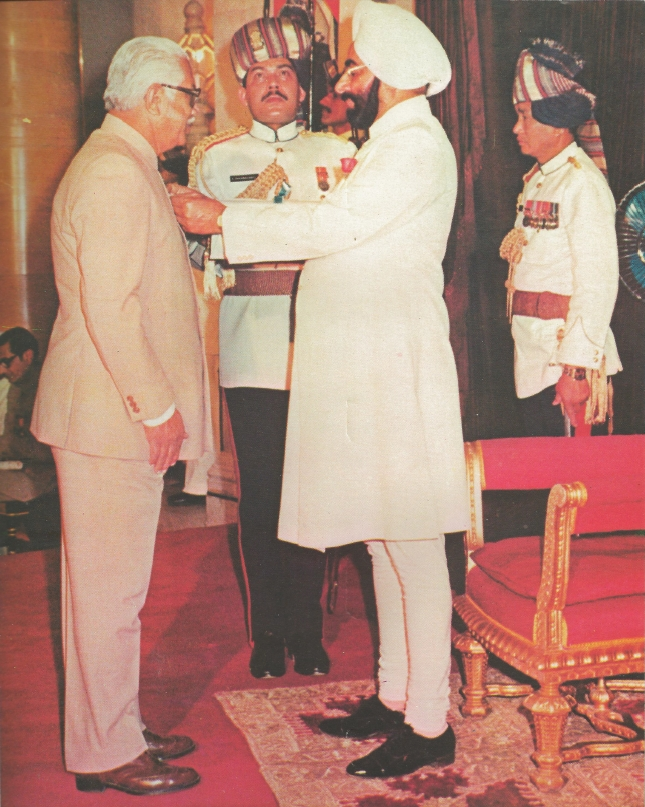
His Excellency Giani Zail Singh, President of India, presenting the award of Padma Shri to Zainulabedin Gulamhusain Rangoonwala

Rangoonwala was the first banker to be honoured with the Padma Shri, the fourth highest civilian award in the republic of India, in recognition of his services to the Cooperative Banking Movement. The title of Padma Shri was conferred upon him in the field of social work, in acknowledgement of his contribution to the progress of socio-economic development.

== See also ==
- Rafiq Zakaria
- List of Padma Shri award recipients (1980–89)
