= Zane Schwenk =

American wakeboarder

- Born: July 17, 1975 (age 50); Sarasota, Florida, United States
- Occupation: Wakeboarder

Zane Schwenk (born July 17, 1975) is a professional wakeboarder from the United States. He became professional in 1993, and is still active in the sport today. He has competed in the X Games, and is host of the MasterCraft video series Rewind. He also has his own line of CWB wakeboards, the Absolute.

Schwenk's sponsors include CWB Wakeboards, Proline Ropes & Handles, MasterCraft Boats, Spy Optics, and Rusty Clothing.

He was born in Sarasota, Florida, and now lives in Winter Haven, Florida.
