= Zeynelabidîn Zinar =

Kurdish writer and researcher

Zeynelabidîn Zinar (born 1953) is a Kurdish writer and researcher. He was born in the village of Doğankavak in the district of Beşiri in 1953. He has been one of the main figures in the area of Kurdish folklore. Moreover, he has changed many classical Kurdish texts from Arabic script to the Kurdish Latin-based script. Between 1986 and 2006, he has published around seventy books in the Kurdish language. His main work is a ten volume book on the Kurdish folklore and oral traditions, called Xwençe. It took him twelve years to complete this work, and its twelve volumes were published between 1989-1997 in Sweden.

== Works ==
=== Kurdish Folklore ===
1. Xwençe, Vol.I, Kurdî/kurmancî, folklore, Pencînar Kurdish Culture Publishers, Sverige/Stockholm, 1989, 278 pages, ISBN 91-86146-30-0
2. Xwençe, Vol. II, Kurdî/kurmancî, folklore, Pencînar Kurdish Culture Publishers, Sverige/Stockholm, 1990, 288 pages, ISBN 91-86146-35-1
3. Xwençe, Vol III, Kurdî/kurmancî, folklore, Pencînar Kurdish Culture Publishers, Sverige/Stockholm, 1991, 297 pages, ISBN 91-86146-39-4
4. Xwençe, Vol. IV, Kurdî/kurmancî, folklore, Pencînar Kurdish Culture Publishers, Sverige/Stockholm, 1990, 262 pages, ISBN 91-630-0764-9
5. Xwençe, Vol. V, Kurdî/kurmancî, folklore, Pencînar Kurdish Culture Publishers, Sverige/Stockholm, 1991, 293 pages, ISBN 91-630-0762-2
6. Xwençe, Vol. VI, Kurdî/kurmancî, folklore, Pencînar Kurdish Culture Publishers, Sverige/Stockholm, 1993, 266 pages, ISBN 91-630-1689-3
7. Xwençe, Vol.VII, Kurdî/kurmancî, folklore, Pencînar Kurdish Culture Publishers, Sverige/Stockholm, 1994, 280 pages, ISBN 91-972090-1-5
8. Xwençe, Vol.VIII, Kurdî/kurmancî, folklore, Pencînar Kurdish Culture Publishers, Sverige/Stockholm, 1995, 288 pages, ISBN 91-972090-7-4
9. Xwençe, Vol.IX, Kurdî/kurmancî, folklore, Pencînar Kurdish Culture Publishers, Sverige/Stockholm, 1996, 290 pages, ISBN 91-972779-0-8
10. Xwençe, Vol. X, Kurdî/kurmancî, folklore, Pencînar Kurdish Culture Publishers, Sverige/Stockholm, 1997, 268 pages, ISBN 91-972779-3-2

=== Other works ===
1. Nimûne Ji Gencîneya Çanda Qedexekirî (Samples of the Treasures of a Banned Culture). Stockholm, Sweden: Navnişana xwestinê, Yekîtiya Nivîskarên Kurd. 1991. OCLC 31608082.
2. Siyabend û Xecê, Folklore-Biography, Sverige/Stockholm, 1992, 160 pages, ISBN 91-630-1222-7
3. Bingeha Çîroka Kurdî (Foundations of the Kurdish Story), Kurdî/kurmancî, Sverige/Stockholm, 12/2000, 134 pages, ISBN 91-89491-12-2

== See also ==
- List of Kurdish scholars
