= Zain Al Fandi =

Syrian footballer (born 1983)

Zain Al Fandi زين العابدين الفندي
Personal information
- Full name: Zain Al Aabdin Al Fandi
- Date of birth: 15 January 1983 (age 43)
- Place of birth: Syria
- Height: 1.78 m (5 ft 10 in)
- Position: Defender

Senior career*
Years	Team	Apps	(Gls)
2003–2005	Al-Yaqaza		
2005–2007	Al-Futowa		
2007–2011	Al-Taliya		
2012	Al-Arabi	3	(0)
2013–2014	Al-Shorta		
2014–2015	Al-Muhafaza		
2015–2018	Al-Sahel		
2018–2021	Al-Fotuwa		

International career^{‡}
2007–2015	Syria	11	(0)
- * Club domestic league appearances and goals ‡ National team caps and goals as of 24 May 2015

Zain Al Fandi (Arabic: زين الفندي; born 15 January 1983 in Syria) is a Syrian football.

== Honour and Titles ==
=== National team ===
- Nehru Cup:
  - Runner-up (1): 2007
