= Zainulabedin Ismail Hamdulay =

Indian cardiac surgeon

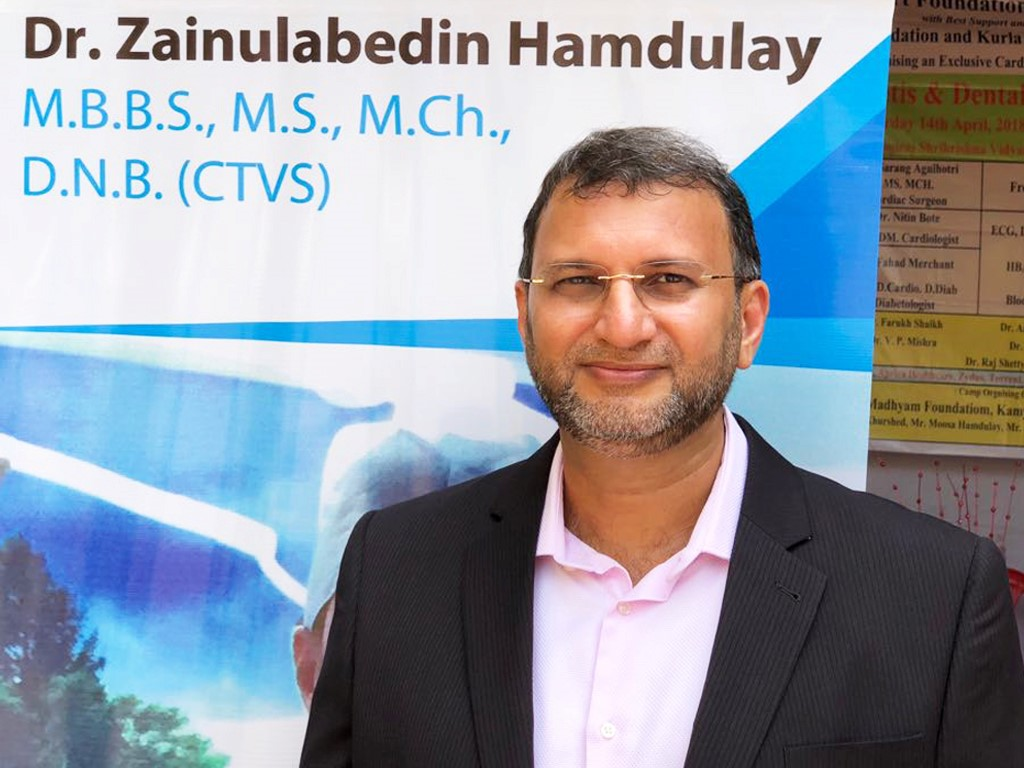
- Born: 15 January 1970 (age 55); Parli, Maharashtra, India
- Education: St. Joseph High School, Solapur; DBF Dayanand College of Arts & Science, Solapur; Shivaji University, Kolhapur; National Board of Examinations – New Delhi; Mumbai University
- Known for: Coronary artery bypass surgery Cardiac surgery
- Medical career
- Profession: Founder, Hamdulay Heart Foundation, Director of cardiothoracic and vascular surgery, Global Hospital
- Sub-specialties: Cardiovascular Thoracic Surgery

Zainulabedin Hamdulay (born 15 January 1970) is an Indian cardiac surgeon. He is the joint secretary and treasurer at Indian Association of Cardiovascular (IACTS). He is the director of cardiothoracic and vascular surgery at Global Hospital, Parel, Mumbai. He is also a Founder of Hamdulay Heart Foundation. Hamdulay has attended over 7,000 cardiac surgeries.

== Early life ==
Zainulabedin Hamdulay was born in Shirshi In Khed Taluka Dist. Ratnagiri, Maharashtra. His primary school education was at St. Joseph High School in Solapur. He joined D.B.F Dayanand College of Arts and Science for his Bachelor's degree in Science. He completed his MBBS in 1992. And then further went on to complete his M.S. in 1996. He completed his M.Ch Cardiovascular and thoracic surgery from the University of Mumbai. Hamdulay is the alumni of Sion Hospital and also has studied and trained in cardiac surgery at Toronto General Hospital, Toronto, Canada; Manchester Royal Infirmary, Manchester, UK and Royal Liverpool Children's Hospital, Liverpool, UK.

== Career ==
Dr. Zainulabedin Hamdulay has accepted his first fellowship in Military Hospital Pune and then later he got accepted for a fellowship in U.K., Liverpool to train in the pediatric cardiac surgery at the Royal Liverpool Children's Hospital. He came back to India to serve the country and with his idea to make cardiac surgery affordable and subsidized he went to Prince Aly Khan Hospital and set up a center, where he continued for 10 years.

In the year 2013, he was appointed as the Chief Cardiac surgeon in Wockhardt Hospital and continued there till 2016. He was the director of cardiothoracic and vascular surgery at Global Hospital Parel, Mumbai. Currently, he is the director of Masina Heart Institute of Masina Hospital, Byculla, Mumbai.
