= Abdin, Idlib =

Abdin, Idlib عابدين
- Town
- Location in Syria
- Coordinates: 35°28′1.8″N 36°32′12.7″E
- Country: Syria
- Governorate: Idlib
- District: Maarrat al-Nu'man District
- Subdistrict: Khan Shaykhun Nahiyah

Population (2004)
  - Total: 1,264
- Time zone: UTC+2 (EET)
  - Summer (DST): UTC+3 (EEST)
- City Qrya Pcode: C3990

Abdin, Idlib (Arabic: عابدين) is a Syrian town located in Khan Shaykhun Nahiyah in Maarrat al-Nu'man District, Idlib. According to the Syria Central Bureau of Statistics (CBS), Abdin had a population of 1,264 in the 2004 census.
