= Ye Gavi, Susan =

Ye Gavi يگاوي
- Village
- Location within Iran
- Coordinates: 32°02′43″N 49°49′16″E
- Country: Iran
- Province: Khuzestan
- County: Izeh
- Bakhsh: Susan
- Rural District: Susan-e Gharbi

Population (2006)
  - Total: 41
- Time zone: UTC+3:30 (IRST)
  - Summer (DST): UTC+4:30 (IRDT)

Ye Gavi (Persian: يگاوي, also Romanized as Ye Gāvī; also known as Yegā’ī, Yeka’i, Yek Gāvī, and Zīnābād) is a village in Susan-e Gharbi Rural District, Susan District, Izeh County, Khuzestan Province, Iran. At the 2006 census, its population was 41, in 9 families.
