= Zeynel Abidin Erdem =

Turkish business tycoon (born 1944)

- Born: 15 February 1944 (age 82); Mardin, Turkey
- Occupations: Chairman and CEO, Erdem Holdings

Zeynel Abidin Erdem (born February 15, 1944, in Savur, Mardin) is a Turkish business tycoon and the honorary consul of the Kingdom of Spain to the Marmara Region of Turkey and the honorary consul of the Republic of Sudan to the Republic of Turkey. He was born on 15 February 1944 in Savur, Mardin, Turkey. After his graduation from Faculty of Chemistry of Yıldız Technical University, Istanbul, he completed the doctorate program of Faculty of Management of Istanbul University. He worked as an assistant in the Chair of Industrial Inorganic Chemistry between 1973 and 1976. He was the president of the Istanbul Chamber of Chemical Engineers between 1972 and 1974 and the president of Kimsan Labor Union in 1973.

Dr. Erdem began his business life in 1965. Currently he is the president of the board of directors of the following companies:

1. Erdem Holdings
2. Gen-Pa General Marketing
3. Ertel Erdem Telecommunications
4. Erdem Computer
5. Erdem Petrol Limited
6. ERMEKS-ER Distribution and Foreign Trade (free zone)
7. Erdem Insurance
8. Erdem Golf and Tourism Investments
9. AGDAŞ Natural Gas Distribution
10. ERDEM Education, Culture and Social Help Pious Foundation

== His memberships ==
Dr. Erdem is also a member of the following associations:

1. Chairman of Turkish-Spanish Business Council, since 1992
2. Vice Chairman of Turkish–French Business Council
3. Honorary President of TABA AmCham (Turkish American Business Association)
4. Vice Chairman of Turkish–Iraqi Business Council
5. Member of the Executive Board of DEIK – Foreign Economic Relations Council
6. Member of Turkish Belgium Commercial Association
7. Former president of the Club of Rome Turkey,
8. Secretary General of the Turgut Özal Research Foundation for Intellectual Idea Development
9. Member of the Chemistry Foundation of Turkey

On 2 May 2006, the Presidency Counsel of the Grand National Assembly of Turkey has awarded Dr. Zeynel Abidin Erdem with the "Superior Service Award Medal and Title of Privilege" of the Turkish Parliament for his superior servings to the Republic of Turkey and the Turkish nation both in the national and international level, for his contribution to the promotion of Turkey, and for his worthwhile services for the prosperity, education, wellness and social development of the nation.

Dr. Erdem continues his social services through his presidency at the MAREV – Association of Businessmen of Mardin and as former chairman and member of the Association of Yüzyıl Işıl High Schools. He is a member of the Global Advisory Board of the George Washington University. On 29 June 2000 he was also honored by Omar Hasan Ahmad al-Bashir, President of the Republic of Sudan with a legion of honor. Dr. Erdem served two terms as Chairman of the Turkish-American Businessmen Association , an accredited American Chamber of Commerce in Turkey,.

Since 1996 he is also a "Commander of the Order of the Spanish Civil Merit" as bestowed by H.M King Juan Carlos I of Spain.

He is closely affiliated with sports, especially with golf. He is an active member of the Board of Directors of Federation of Golf and the Board of Directors of Federation Sailing.

Dr. Zeynel Abidin Erdem is married and has two children.
