= List of Lebanese people in the United Arab Emirates =

Lebanese expatriates that work in the United Arab Emirates are involved in business and the media as beauty surgeons, businessmen, artists, presenters and news anchors.

Notable Lebanese people in the UAE include:

- Cyba Audi: Entrepreneur and communication expert.
- Antoine Choueiri: owner of the Middle East’s largest media broker (Choueiri Group) that controls Arabian Media Services International, MEMS, Arabian Outdoor, Times International, Audio Visual Media, C Media, Press Media, Digital Media Services, Interadio, Promofair, AMC and SECOMM.
- Ralph Debbas: Automotive designer, founder and part-owner of W Motors.
- Diana Haddad: Lebanese singer (holding the Emirati citizenship) and former wife of the Emirati director, Suhail Al Abdool.
- Jessica Kahawaty: Miss World Australia 2012
- Taleb Kanaan: Al Arabiya presenter.
- Rima Maktabi: Al Arabiya news presenter and former presenter of Inside the Middle East on CNN International.
- Elias Bou Saab: the Founder of the American University in Dubai (AUD).
- Iskandar Safa: Owner of Privinvest, the major defence contractor in Europe controlling shipyards and facilities.
- Najwa Qassem: Al Arabiya presenter.

== See also ==
- List of Lebanese people
- List of Lebanese people (Diaspora)
- Lebanese people in the United Arab Emirates
