= Lebanese people in the United Arab Emirates =

Total population
- 80,000 - 156,000

Regions with significant populations
- Dubai, Abu Dhabi and Sharjah.

Languages
- Lebanese Arabic, French and English

Religion
- Christians and Muslims

Lebanese people in the United Arab Emirates have a population exceeding 80,000, closer estimates report a total of 156,000 Lebanese in the Emirates. Lebanese people form one of the largest communities of non-citizen Arabs in the UAE. In addition, an increasing number of Lebanese students seeking education and career opportunities opted for the country in light of its relatively reputable institutions across the Middle East, the case that applies mostly to those born in United Arab Emirates.

The Lebanese people tend to be spread out over various emirates of the country, with areas of high concentration being Dubai, Abu Dhabi and Sharjah. Currently, the Lebanese job market is fully dominant by Lebanese national especially for specific industries such as consulting where large population of Lebanese are spread across all big consulting firms.

== Background ==
Early migration of Lebanese people to the Emirates began during Lebanese Civil War (1975-1990) which resulted in a high influx of Lebanese moving their businesses to Dubai, Sharjah and Abu Dhabi and continued to do so during the 1990s and the further ongoing civil unrest in Lebanon due to the 2011 Syrian Civil War.

The majority of Lebanese expatriates that fled during the Lebanese Civil War to the UAE are highly educated, fluent in both French and English languages, and affluent as well as being involved in business and the media as beauty surgeons, businessmen, artists, presenters and news anchors.

== Economic contributions ==
There are over fifteen thousand (15,000) Lebanese companies operating in the Jebel Ali Free Zone alone, an economic hub located in Jebel Ali, a city in Dubai.

== Lebanese people in the United Arab Emirates ==
- Antoine Choueiri, owner of the Middle East's largest media broker (Choueiri Group) that controls Arabian Media Services International, MEMS, Arabian Outdoor, Times International, Audio Visual Media, C Media, Press Media, Digital Media Services, Interadio, Promofair, AMC and SECOMM
- Iskandar Safa, owner of Privinvest, the major defence contractor in Europe controlling shipyards and facilities
- Ralph R. Debbas, automotive designer, founder and part-owner of the sports car manufacturer W Motors
- Cyba Audi, entrepreneur and communication expert
- Rima Maktabi, Al Arabiya news presenter and former presenter of Inside the Middle East on CNN International
- Taleb Kanaan, Al Arabiya presenter
- Najwa Qassem, Al Arabiya presenter
- Diana Haddad: Lebanese singer (holding the Emirati citizenship) and former wife of the Emirati director, Suhail Al Abdool
- Manal bint Mohammed bin Rashid Al Maktoum: Emirati politician and the daughter of Mohammed bin Rashid Al Maktoum the ruler of Dubai and his former Lebanese wife Randa Bint Mohammed Al-Banna

== See also ==
- Lebanon–United Arab Emirates relations
- Expatriates in the United Arab Emirates
- Lebanese Diaspora
- W Motors
- List of Lebanese people in the United Arab Emirates
