= 2008 Lebanon conflict =

Intrastate conflict in Lebanon in 2008

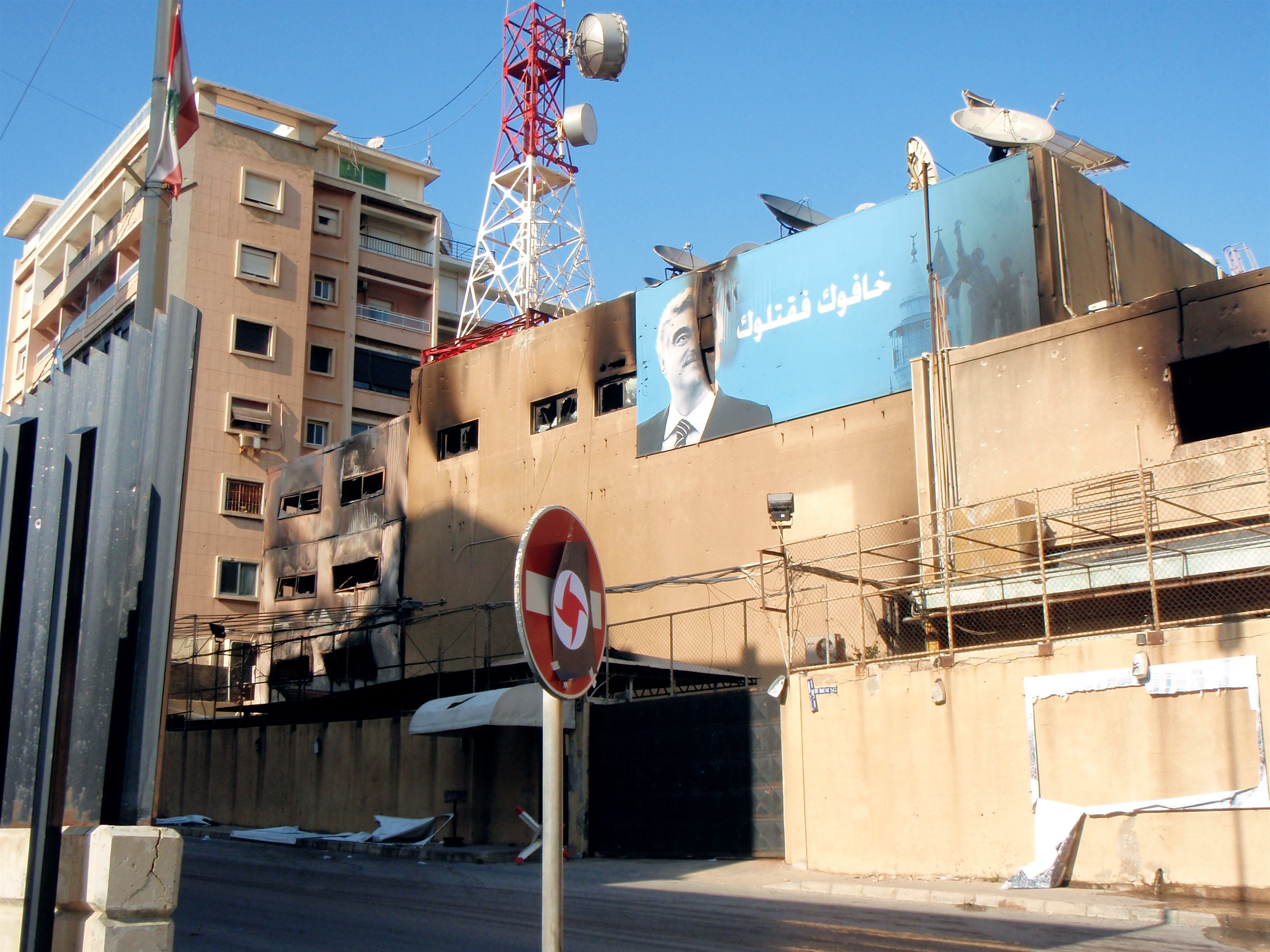
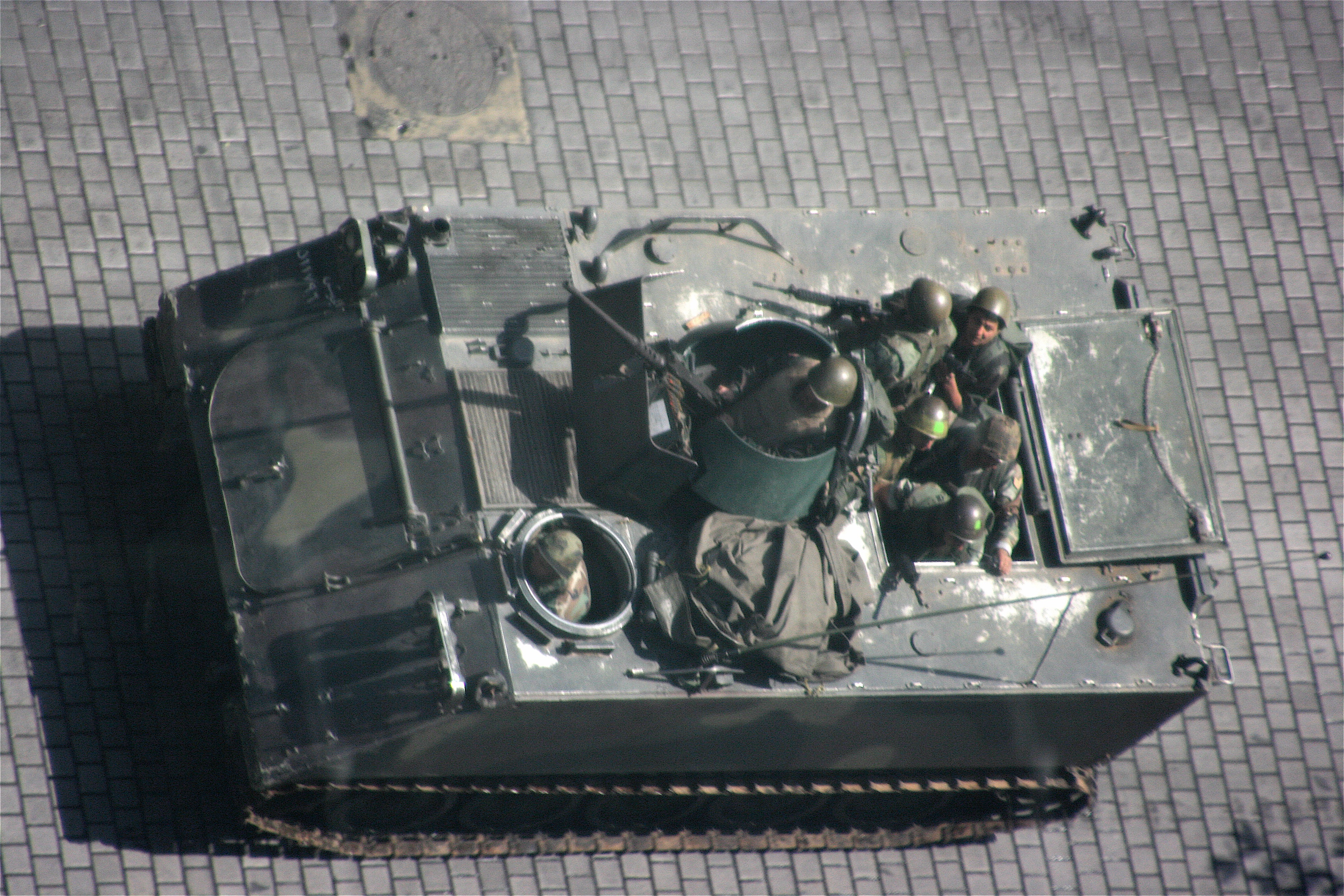
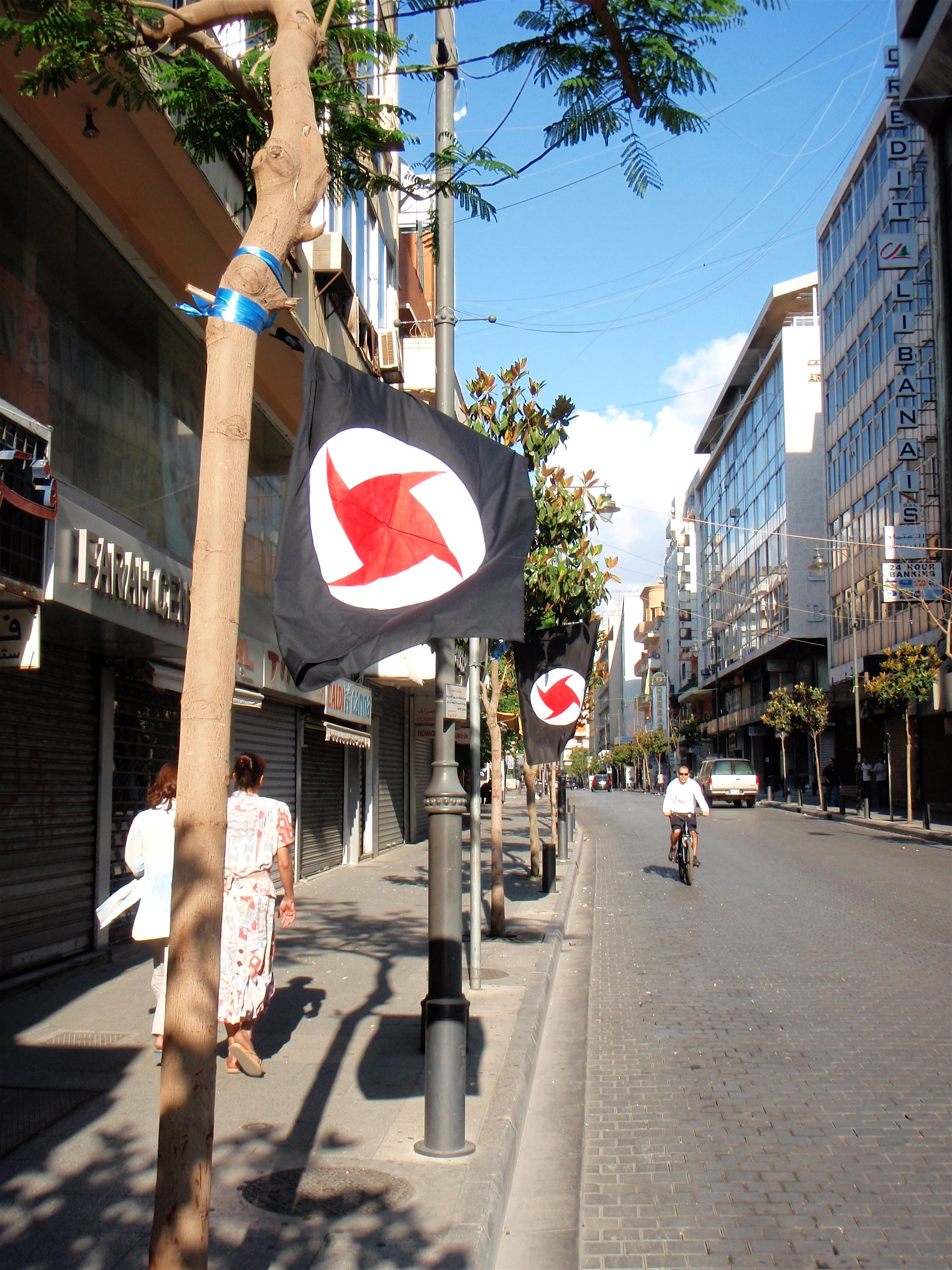
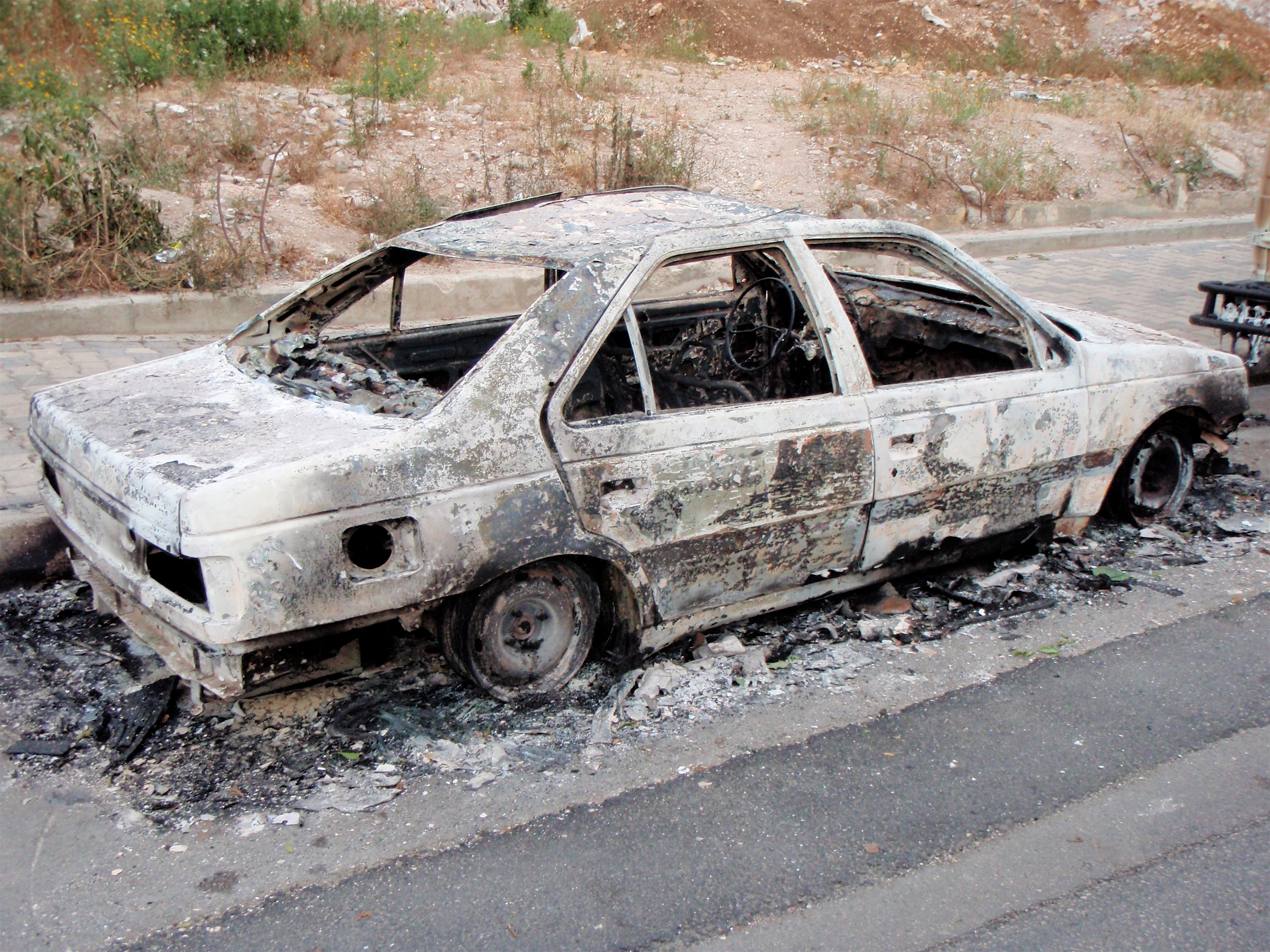
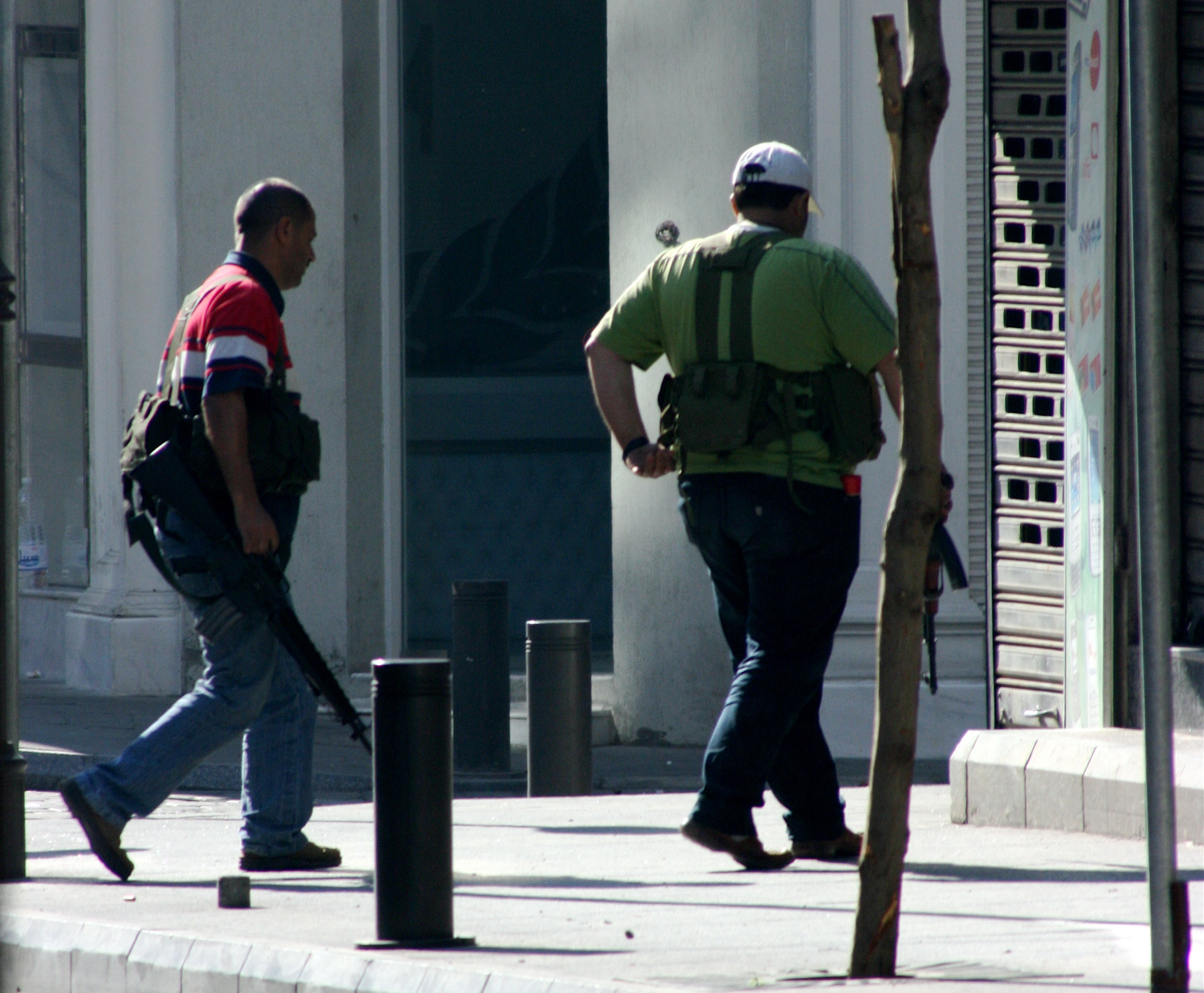
- Top to bottom, and left to right: Future TV building in Beirut after suffering from arson, A Lebanese Army M113 armored personnel carrier in Beirut, flag of the SSNP in a Beirut street, Destroyed car in Beirut, picture of armed fighters taken from the Crowne Plaza in Beirut.
Date	May 7, 2008 – May 14, 2008 (main phase, sporadic clashes continued into July) (1 week)
Location	Lebanon
Result	Doha Agreement (2008)

Belligerents
March 14 Alliance; Future Movement; Progressive Socialist Party	March 8 Alliance; Hezbollah; Amal Movement; LDP; SSNP-L; Arab Democratic Party

Commanders and leaders
Saad Hariri; Walid Jumblatt	(Hezbollah) Hassan Nasrallah; Nabih Berri; Talal Arslan; Rabi Banat; Ali Eid

Casualties and losses
- 70–110 dead

The 2008 Lebanon conflict (or the 7 May clashes; Arabic: أحداث 7 أيار) was a brief civil war in May 2008 in Lebanon between Hezbollah and pro-government Sunnis. After the 18-month-long political crisis spiralled out of control, with the government's decision to dismantle Hezbollah's telecommunication system, Hezbollah seized control of majority Sunni neighborhoods in west Beirut. The conflict ended with the adoption of the Doha Accord in 2008.

The fighting between pro-government and Hezbollah affiliated to respectively the Future Movement and PSP political parties on one side and Hezbollah, Amal, SSNP, LDP and the Arab Democratic Party on the other side, was sparked by a government move to shut down Hezbollah's telecommunication network and remove Beirut Airport's head of security after the discovery of a hidden remote-controlled camera monitoring one of the airport's runway and his alleged ties to Hezbollah.

Clashes first occurred on May 7 after a general strike called for by the country's union federation to demand higher wages and decry high consumer prices became overshadowed by the government's decisions and escalated into low-level violence between pro-government and Hezbollah.

Violence severely escalated the next morning on May 8 after a televised speech by Hezbollah leader Hassan Nasrallah.

In his speech, Nasrallah called the Lebanese government decision to ban the organization's telecommunication network a declaration of war. Shortly after his speech, heavy fighting broke out in Beirut.

Within two days, Hezbollah-led opposition fighters had seized control of several West Beirut majority Sunni neighbourhoods from pro-government Future Movement militiamen.

In the following days, fighting between pro-government and Hezbollah spread to other parts of the country with major clashes in the Aley District and Tripoli. On May 15, an intervention by the Arab League brokered an immediate end to hostilities and a pledge from warring parties to send emissaries to Doha for a mediation process. The resulting Doha Agreement, reached on May 21, 2008, brought an end to the 18-month political feud that exploded into fighting and nearly drove the country to a new civil war.

== Background ==
On December 1, 2006, a series of protests and sit-ins began in Lebanon, led by the March 8 political coalition which opposed the government of Prime Minister Fouad Siniora. Formed after the Cedar Revolution in 2005, the March 8 coalition was made up of the Shiite Hezbollah and Amal, the Christian Free Patriotic Movement and a number of smaller parties such as the SSNP, LDP and the Arab Democratic Party. On the other side of the political divide stood the March 14 coalition, at the time holding the majority of cabinet and parliamentary seats. The March 14 coalition was made up of the primarily Sunni Future Movement and a number of smaller parties including the Druze Progressive Socialist Party and the Christian Lebanese Forces.

At the core of commencement of the protests was the unhappiness of Hezbollah with the division of power under the current status quo and the pro-Western course of the Lebanese government. It argued that too much executive power was in the hands of the Future Movement, the primary political party of March 14, which it in their view misused by too closely aligned with Western states, most notably the United States, thereby compromising Lebanon's sovereignty and security. In addition, the period was marked by political strife between the March 8 and March 14 coalitions over the international investigation on the assassination of former prime minister Rafic Hariri, the creation of the future Lebanon Tribunal to prosecute the perpetrators this assassination and the question of Hezbollah's armed status. Hezbollah was the only organization allowed to retain its weapons after the ratification of the Taif Agreement, which brought an end to the Lebanese Civil War, although UN Security Council Resolution 1559 of September 2004 denied the organization the right to retain its arms. By 2008, the military strength of the organization had grown to such levels that it was widely considered to be stronger than the Lebanese Armed Forces. To ensure its interests, Hezbollah demanded a new national unity government in which March 8 would have at least a third plus one of the cabinet seats in order to grant them the ability to veto cabinet decisions.

After Shi'a ministers of Hezbollah and Amal had resigned from the cabinet in December 2006 in protest against a decision concerning the Lebanon Tribunal, the opposition demanded the immediate resignation of the cabinet as it now was unbalanced with regard to the proportional representation of religious groups as stipulated by the Lebanese Constitution and therefore was deemed illegitimate. When Prime Minister Siniora refused to resign his cabinet, Hezbollah and its allies on March 8 called on its supporters in early December 2006 to protest against the perceived illegitimacy of the cabinet of Siniora to increase pressure on it. In the face of massive protests, Siniora and the remaining ministers in his cabinet still refused to step down as long as they enjoyed the support of the majority of the parliament. As protestors kept up the pressure on the government with their encampment near the Grand Serail, the prime ministerial office in downtown Beirut, Siniora and his minister were under virtual house arrest due to security concerns since the assassination of Pierre Gemayel, one of Siniora's ministers, in late 2006. With Siniora not giving in, the opposition organized a general strike in January 2007, which ended in sectarian clashes leaving multiple dead and hundreds wounded. Political deadlock took a new turn with the end of term of President Émile Lahoud in late 2007 as the March 8 and March 14 blocs could not agree on his successor, leaving the country in a presidential vacuum further worsening the political crisis.

== May 2008 controversies ==
In May 2008, the tensions between the pro-government and opposition parties escalated when the cabinet announced a series of security decisions. Tensions began with revelations on Friday May 2 made by Progressive Socialist Party leader Walid Jumblatt, a key politician in the ruling March 14 alliance. He announced that a remote-controlled camera had been set up in a container park overlooking Beirut international airport's runway 17, which was frequently being used by March 14 politicians. In March 14 circles, fear was that the monitoring could be used for a possible attack on its leaders, as Lebanon had faced a series of political assassinations in recent times. Although Jumblatt did not accuse the party directly, he made clear that he thought March 8's Hezbollah was behind the monitoring system's installment. Hezbollah dismissed the accusations, calling the allegation a product of Jumblatt's imagination and saying that those who leveled them were scaremongering and simply parroting a US campaign against it and other groups which are resisting Israel. In addition to the monitoring system, Jumblatt stated that Hezbollah had laid down a fiber optic telecommunication network connecting its powerbase in Dahiya in South Beirut with cities and towns in South and East Lebanon in predominantly Shiite areas. Although this was known to the government, it was now claimed that the network was being extended to the predominantly Christian and Druze areas of Mount Lebanon.

In its response to these allegations, the Lebanese cabinet announced that it regarded the telecommunication network and the monitoring system as a breach of law, undermining the state's sovereignty and the security of its citizens. Therefore, it declared that the matter would be referred not only to the Lebanese judicial system, but also to the Arab League and the United Nations. In addition to infringing state sovereignty, the network was regarded by the government as an infringement on public funds since it claimed that it competes with its own and used the Lebanese infrastructure. The cabinet announced that it would uproot the telecommunication network and also ordered the removal of Brigadier General Wafic Shkeir, head of security at Beirut's international airport and considered to be sympathetic to Hezbollah and Amal, on account of failing to deal with the monitoring system. These moves severely antagonized Hezbollah, bringing tensions between the March 8 and March 14 coalitions to a boiling point.

== Armed clashes ==
=== May 7: Protests and minor clashes ===
Coincidentally, a day after the cabinet's decision, on Wednesday May 7, the Lebanese General Workers Union had planned a general strike to demand higher wages and decry high consumer prices. The strike turned violent as the opposition threw their weight behind the strike, paralyzing large parts of Lebanon's capital Beirut. Instigated by the recent developments and the strike, pro-government and opposition supporters took the streets coming into conflict with each other at multiple places. Clashes were first reported when government and opposition supporters in a pro-government sector of Beirut exchanged insults and began throwing stones at each other after Hezbollah supporters insisted on blocking the roads. Witnesses said security forces intervened and gunshots were heard, apparently troops firing in the air to disperse the crowds. In the afternoon, verbal violence and stone throwing turned into more violent clashes, with gunfire sporadically going off in the city. Around the city, armed opposition supporters blocked roads including the strategic road towards Beirut international airport, cutting it off from the rest of the city, and roads to the city's sea port.

=== May 8 - May 9: Takeover of Beirut ===
After a tense night with sporadic gunfire, Hezbollah's secretary-general Hassan Nasrallah addressed the country in a speech televised on Hezbollah affiliated al-Manar station in the morning of May 8. He referred to the cabinet's decisions of that week as "despotic" and having inaugurated a new phase in Lebanese history, similar to the assassination of former prime minister Rafic Hariri in 2005. He stated that the telecommunication network was not a simple commercial operation aimed merely at generating profit for the organization, but "integral and fundamental" as part of its military apparatus. He claimed that his opponents had already known about the existence of the telecommunication network years before and in drawing attention to the timing of the decision, insinuated that the cabinet's actions were aimed at obstructing the forces of the Resistance (against Israel) in the region. Hezbollah had the right to defend itself, he argued, and metaphorically stated that they would cut-off the hand of anyone that would touch the Resistance. "All red lines had been crossed", according to Nasrallah, and the actions therefore amounted to no less than a "declaration of war."

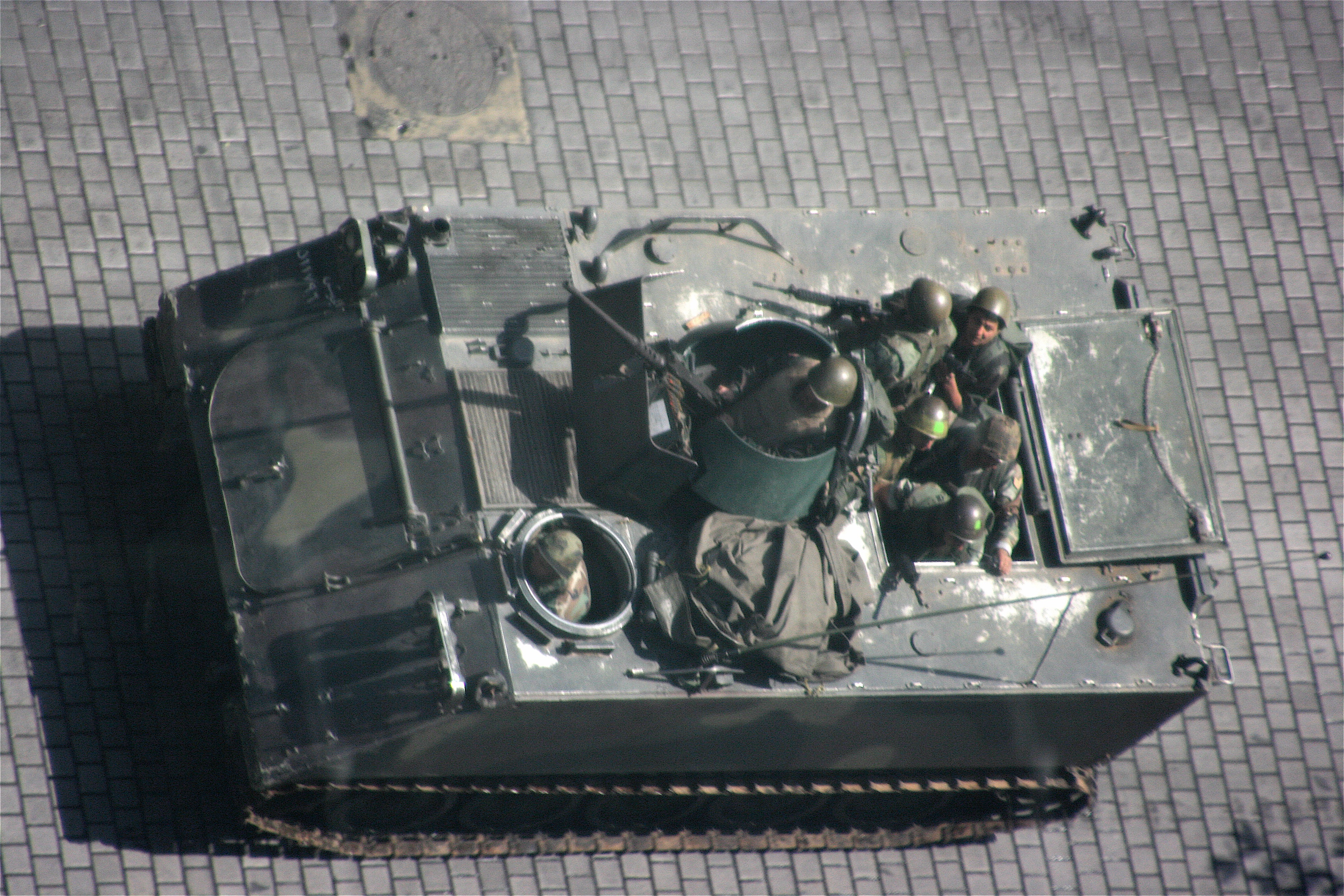
A Lebanese APC in Beirut, on May 9, during the unrest

Minutes after Nasrallah's speech, heavy street battles began between pro-government and Hezbollah. Fighting erupted along Corniche Mazraa, an avenue separating Shiite and Sunni areas, later spreading to the western, southern and eastern parts of Beirut where Sunni and Shiite neighborhoods overlapped. Combat was also heard near the office of Lebanon's Sunni religious leader - an ally of the government - and the palatial compound of the Hariri family in Koreitem was hit by RPG fire. More barricades were set up, closing major highways. Hezbollah eventually overran the positions of pro-government militias in West Beirut and burnt-down three pro-government offices. Saad Hariri, leader of the Future Movement, quickly responded to the outbreak of violence, describing the events as a form of fitna, criticizing the actions of Hezbollah as a threat to the unity of the country and calling on Nasrallah to stop the descendance towards civil war. Faced with large-scale inter-communal violence erupting all over the city, the Lebanese Armed Forces decided not to intervene in the clashes for fear of sparking divisions in the army along sectarian lines, as had happened during the civil war. Other factors that as to why the army did not act in line with the cabinet are, according to political scientist Aram Nerguizian, the apprehension among army commanders at how the cabinet chose to address the issue of Hezbollah's telecommunication network. Secondly, the perception among them that cabinet also did not sufficiently consult the army prior to their decision to dismiss Beirut's airport head of security. Thirdly, the presidential ambitions of Army Commander Michel Suleiman - who would indeed within two weeks become the country's next president - and his resulting need not to antagonize the March 8 coalition and its Syrian allies may also have influenced his decision not to intervene against Hezbollah according to Nerguizian. The army's decision to refrain from intervention did spark objections from within however. Some saw it as a "missed opportunity" for the army to "signal its objection to domestic military action by any of the country's competing political/sectarian forces." Around 120 Sunni officers later even offered their resignation as response to "the humiliation felt from the military's conduct during the militias' invasion of Beirut" as their resignation letter stated. All of the officers except one later repealed their resignation however.

Fighting from the previous day lasted throughout the night and only stopped for a short time a little bit after dawn on May 9, 2008. However, fighting quickly resumed after the brief lull. Pro-government militias were however no match to the Hezbollah led opposition forces. All over West Beirut, pro-government militias had lost ground. Media outlets related to the pro-government Future Movement, amongst which Future TV, Al Mustaqbal Newspaper, Future News, Radio Orient and Future-owned Armenian radio station Sevan had been raided by opposition fighters and forced to close. Future TV and Al Mustaqbal were particularly targeted by opposition fighters. RPG missiles were launched from empty adjacent buildings under construction to Mustaqbal's offices, setting fire to two floors. Future TV offices were raided by Hezbollah members who subsequently cut all of its broadcasts. According to Habib Battah, a media analyst, shutting down Future TV was not only a psychological attack on Future Movement's supporters, but also gave the opposition a monopoly on propaganda messages.

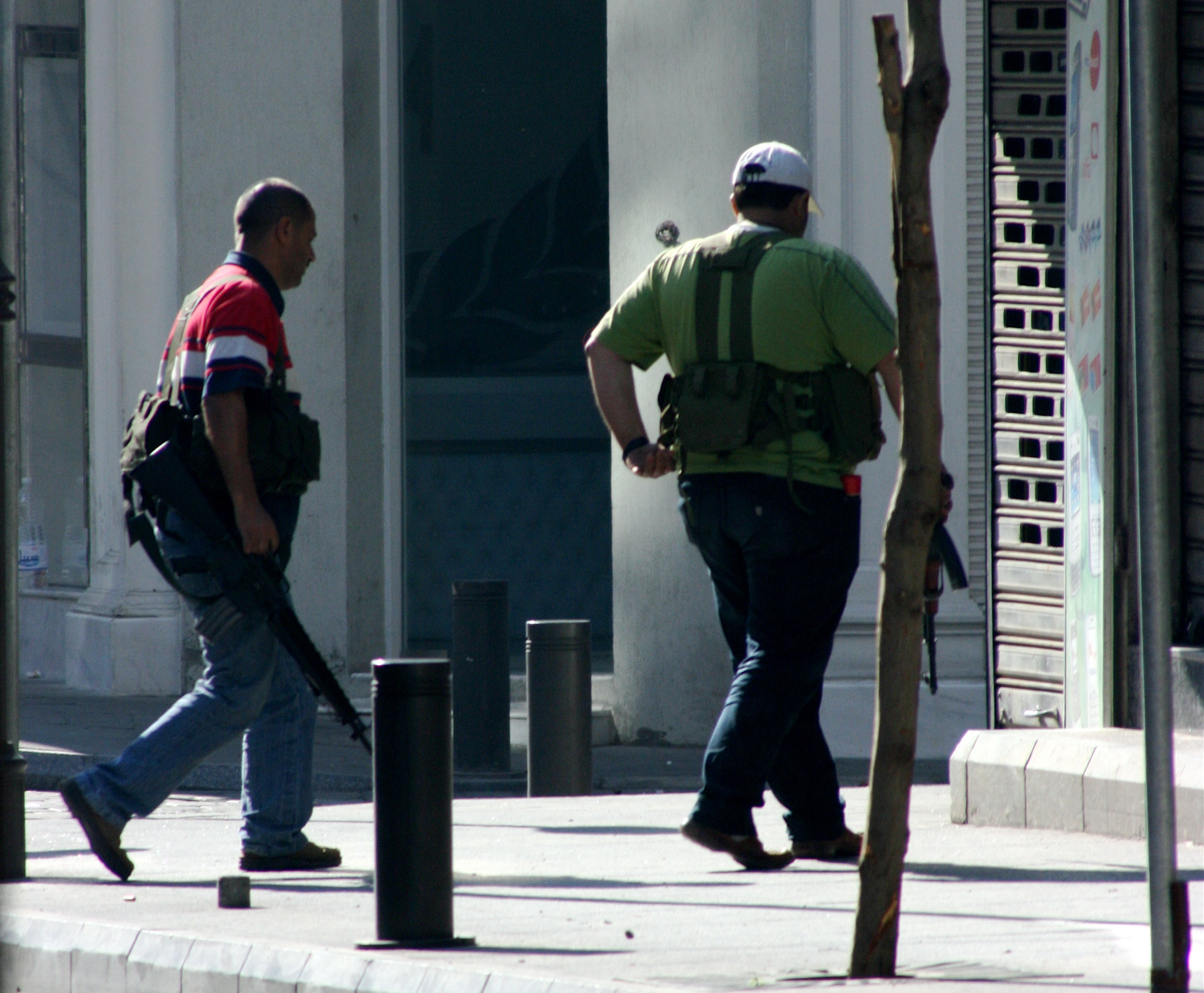
Armed fighters near the Crowne Plaza in Beirut on May 9

Overpowered by Hezbollah's military apparatus and besieged in his residence, Saad Hariri had by then ordered militia members loyal to his Future Movement to stand down. The opposition had now firmly moved in and taken over abandoned positions of pro-government fighters, seizing large parts of the capital's western neighbourhoods. The Lebanese Army also stepped in to take over position deserted by pro-government militiamen and in some instance were handed over control of recently conquered position by Hezbollah. In some neighbourhoods, the takeover had been peaceful with opposition fighters facing no resistance as they moved throughout West Beirut.

=== May 10 - May 12: Fighting spreads to Aley and the North ===
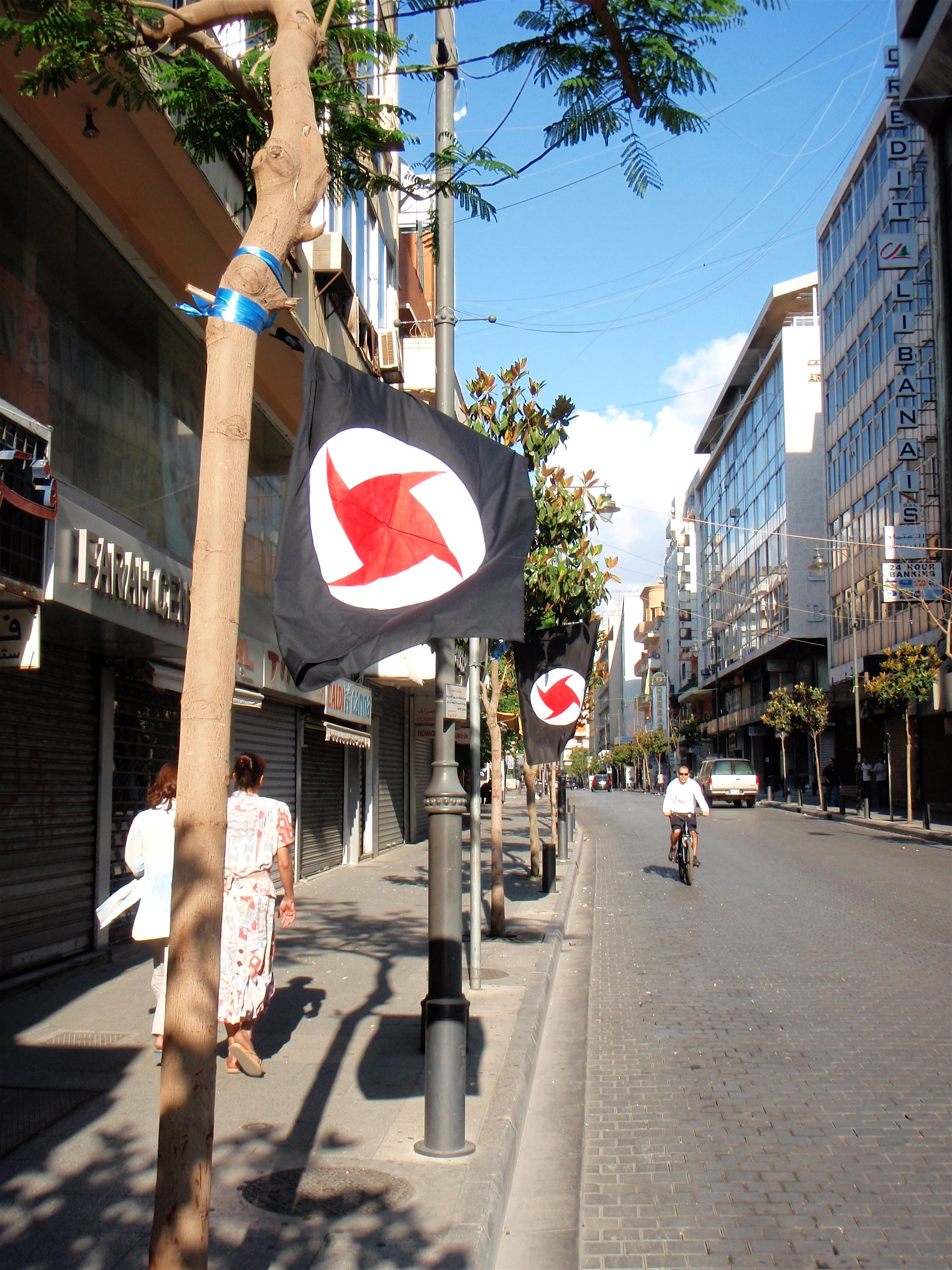
Flags of the Syrian Social Nationalist Party were raised as a victory during the unrest on May 9th, 2008.

As fighting in Beirut dwindled down, violence began to spread to other parts of the country, in particular the Aley District south of Beirut and the north of the country. In the evening of May 9 sporadic clashes erupted in Sidon, where two civilians were killed; and in Bar Elias in the Bekaa Valley where a woman was killed. Also, eight people were killed near the town of Aley in clashes between government supporters and opponents. Seven people who were Hezbollah supporters were killed.

On May 10, 2008, a funeral procession was attacked by a shop-owner affiliated with the Amal Movement, whose shop was previously burned down by Sunni militants, leaving six people dead. An Associated Press photographer who witnessed the shooting said the attack came as a procession of 200 people headed toward a nearby cemetery to bury a 24-year-old pro-government supporter killed in previous fighting. At least 14 people were killed in the town of Halba, in the Akkar region of north Lebanon, as about 100 pro-Future Movement gunmen attacked an office of the SSNP. 10 of the dead were SSNP members, three were government loyalists and one was an Australian citizen of Lebanese descent on vacation in Lebanon, who was trying to get information at the SSNP offices about evacuating from the city. The Australian father of four, Fadi Sheikh, reportedly had his hands and feet cut off. The SSNP says Fadi Sheikh was a member of the party - but was not a militant. He was just in the wrong place at the wrong time. One other person was killed in fighting in Sidon and two soldiers died in fighting east of Beirut. Heavy fighting had also broken out between Alawite Hezbollah sympathizers and Sunni supporters of the government in the neighbourhoods of Jabal Mohsen and Bab al-Tabbaneh, two neighbourhoods in Tripoli notorious for its sectarian violence, leading thousands to flee their homes.

Faced with the escalated situation as a result of the cabinet's decisions, Prime Minister Fouad Siniora announced on May 10 that the cabinet would handover the issue of telecommunication network to the army and, in addition, announced the reinstatement of the head of security of Beirut's international airport. Subsequently, the Lebanese army took a more active stance in the events and announced it had frozen the measures taken by the government and called for all armed militants to withdraw from the streets. In response, Hezbollah announced that it would withdraw its fighters together with other opposition fighters from West Beirut in compliance with the Lebanese army's request, but that a civil disobedience campaign will continue until the group's political demands are met. The next day, Beirut was quiet as control of areas seized by the opposition was handed over to the Lebanese army. Many roads in the capital remained blockaded however, including the strategic airport road, as the opposition continued their campaign of civil disobedience.

==== Battle of Mount Barook and Aley District ====
On May 9, heavy fighting broke out in Mount Lebanon between pro-government Progressive Socialist Party fighters and Hezbollah. The clashes started in Aytat, near Kaifun and soon expanded to cover many spots in Mount Lebanon including the cities of Baisour, Choueifat and Aley. Most of the fighting was concentrated on Hill 888. Fighting started when four Druze members of the Aley municipal police were kidnapped by Hezbollah. Soon after the news of the kidnapping spread, the mayor of Aley assembled a group of PSP fighters and went up to Hill 888. As they reached the hill they were attacked by Hezbollah gunmen who wounded a few of the PSP and municipality members. PSP members retaliated by killing 3 of the kidnappers. The incident developed into a significant armed clash. Artillery and mortars were used for the first time during these battles. A ceasefire agreement was supposed to take place at 18:00 of the same day, but fighters from both sides continued to exchange fire. Negotiations were ongoing for the PSP members to give up the fight and surrender their positions to the Lebanese Army, but it never happened.

The battles at Aley stopped for several hours, but the two sides clashed again in Mount Barouk to the southeast shortly before midnight. Barook separates the Druze heartland of Shouf from the mainly Shi'ite southern end of the Bekaa Valley. That night Hezbollah's fighters deployed from southern Beirut to the Qmatiye area tried to attack the hills near Aley but they were beaten back. After that Hezbollah tried to go on the offensive again and attacked their rival's positions. The Druze fighters had fought the Hezbollah militants from dug-in positions left over from the 1975–90 Civil War. Hezbollah bombarded the pro-government Druze area with artillery while ground forces attacked Druze positions using rockets and machine guns. By morning, the Druze fighters agreed to cease hostilities and several villages loyal to Lebanon's pro-government Druze leader Walid Jumblatt had been handed over to the army. The kidnapped municipality police members were released by Hezbollah on May 12 in exchange of at least 30 Hezbollah members that were kidnapped by PSP in Mount Barook.

==== Clashes in Hamra and Tripoli ====
After a day of relative quiet in Beirut renewed gunfire was heard in the commercial area of Hamra in the western part of the city shortly after midnight on May 12. The fighting occurred near the home of Future Movement leader Saad al-Hariri. A two-man Al Jazeera camera crew suffered injuries while trying to film the fighting and were evacuated by the Lebanese army. Meanwhile, in Tripoli, clashes left one person dead and at least six others wounded. Now taking a proactive role in the events, the Army stated that if the clashes did not end by Tuesday May 13, it would intervene and use force if necessary to end the fighting. The next days saw only limited and sporadic fighting.

== Resolution process ==
=== Arab League intervention ===
As fighting was spreading to other parts of Lebanon, the Arab League, which had been involved as a mediator in Lebanese political crises since 2005, decided to intervene in Lebanon at an emergency meeting on May 11. The League Council mandated the formation of a Ministerial Committee headed by the Foreign Minister of Qatar and the League's Secretary General which was to go to Lebanon and mediate in the crisis. The League Council also called for a halt to the fighting, the withdrawal of militiamen from the streets, the facilitation of the Lebanese Army to restore calm and talks between the Lebanese political leaders. On May 15, after a round of talks with Lebanon's prime political leaders, the Ministerial Committee announced an initial agreement that marked a cessation of all hostilities and entailed that major Lebanese political leaders would enter into a national dialogue the next day in Doha for further mediation.

=== Doha Agreement ===
After half a week of deliberations in Doha, Lebanese political leaders signed an accord on May 21 that brought an immediate end to the 16-month political crisis that had been plaguing the country. Following the principle of "no victor, no vanquished", which entails that no political party or sect can eliminate one of the other political parties or sects, the Doha Agreement was regarded as a compromise deal between government and opposition demands. The accord stipulated (1) the immediate election of Army Commander Michel Suleiman as president; (2) the formation of a national unity government with a blocking third for the opposition; (3) adaption of the electoral law aimed at redistricting based on the 1960 electoral law; (4) a commitment by the signatories not to resort to violence for political gains; (5) initiation of a national dialogue on the promotion of Lebanon's internal sovereignty and (6) a commitment by signatories to abstain from resorting to rhetoric of treason or political and sectarian incitement. The accord was considered a victory for the Lebanese opposition as they secured their key demands for veto-wielding power in the new government and a new electoral law which could benefit the opposition in the upcoming 2009 parliamentary elections. In addition, the question of Hezbollah's weapons was postponed, to be dealt with in a future national dialogue. Nonetheless, the opposition had to give concessions regarding the reappointment of Fouad Siniora as Prime Minister, the distribution of ministerial portfolios and the distribution of parliamentary seats in certain electoral districts. Despite Hezbollah's tactical victory on the streets of Lebanon and the securing of it demands in the accord, analysts have pointed out that the events greatly reduced its legitimacy as a popular resistance movement and that it was seen more than ever as a "Shiite militia brutally defending its parochial interests." In addition, it increased the distrust and fear of it among other political parties and heightened domestic opposition to its armed status as a result of the use of its weapons against other Lebanese actors, despite its earlier pledge not to do so.

== Reactions to the fighting ==
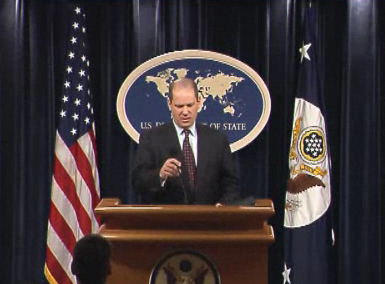
United States Assistant Secretary of State Sean McCormack discussing the unrest in Lebanon

=== Domestic reactions ===
Many March 14 leaders decried the events as a coup, pointed towards the Hezbollah's intricate relationship to the Iranian government and assigned a role played in the events to the latter. Hani Hammoud, a senior adviser to Saad Hariri referred to the events as a "one-sided civil war" with the result that "Iran has taken over the country" Christian leaders Samir Geagea and Amine Gemayel also accused Hezbollah of staging a coup, with the former calling on moderate forces in the Arab world to intervene and asked the international community not to stand idly by. A leaked US diplomatic cable also showed how on May 11, Gemayel, together with Social Affairs Minister Nayla Mouawad and Telecommunications Minister Marwan Hamadeh urged the US to provide more support to the March 14 coalition. Believing that a Hezbollah victory could be imminent, they proposed several ideas, including extending UN Security Council Resolution 1701 to Beirut's airport, sea port and access roads, an imposement of an air ban against Syria by the US and immediate US military aid to their own militias. PSP leader Walid Jumblatt stated that he still stood behind his support for the government's decisions that week, however he acknowledged that he had underestimated the response from Hezbollah. Regarding Hezbollah's next moves he told reporters to "ask [Iranian President] [Mahmoud] Ahmadinejad", stating that "this situation goes beyond Lebanese borders." Furthermore, he linked the events to regional geopolitics stating that "the Iranians chose the moment America is weak in the Middle East. The balance of power has completely changed in Lebanon and now we wait to see what new rules Hezbollah, Syria and Iran will lay down."

Michel Aoun, leader of the Free Patriotic Movement and a Hezbollah ally whose supporters did not participate in the fighting, spoke in more neutral terms, calling for the return for normality on the streets.

=== International reactions ===
The White House condemned Hezbollah's actions with a spokesman denouncing the organization as a "destabilizing force" which had turned "its arms against the Lebanese people and challenged Lebanon's security forces for control of the streets." In addition, US Secretary of State Condoleezza Rice pronounced the continuing support by the US for the Lebanese government.

Saudi Foreign Minister Prince Saud al-Faisal accused Iran of "backing what happened in Lebanon, a coup" and called for "all regional parties to respect the independence and sovereignty of Lebanon and to stop meddling in its affairs and inciting sectarian tensions". He further accused Hezbollah of taking "violent, offensive measures, which aim at an annihilation of people." A leaked diplomatic cable shows, however, that Prince Saud al-Faisal had proposed to the US Ambassador in Saudi Arabia the creation of an "Arab force" to be supported by the US and NATO which was to restore order in Beirut in response to "Hezbollah's military challenge to the Government of Lebanon." Furthermore, he feared that a Hezbollah victory would lead to the fall of the Siniora cabinet and the "Iranian takeover of Lebanon."

Iran's Foreign Ministry Spokesman Mohammad-Ali Hosseini has called on national unity among the Lebanese adding that the situation can be "managed through talks and consensus-building." Hosseini blamed the U.S. and Israel for the ongoing hostilities in Lebanon.

== Casualties ==
The exact total number of casualties as resulting from the fighting in May remains uncertain, but figures range from approximately 70 to 110 deaths. A UN report published in June 2008 reports 69 fatalities, among which civilians, and more than 180 wounded. A Human Rights Watch Report from 2009 states a minimum of 71 deaths. In an article from September 2008 entailing a series of interviews on the events, Beatriz Martínez and Francesco Volpicella note that the official number of casualties up to 15 May is 80 deaths and more than 200 wounded.

== See also ==
- 2006–2008 Lebanese political protests
- Lebanon bombings and assassinations (2004-present)#2008
- List of extrajudicial killings and political violence in Lebanon
