= 2006–2008 Lebanese protests =

Series of political protests in Lebanon

2006-2008 Lebanese protests
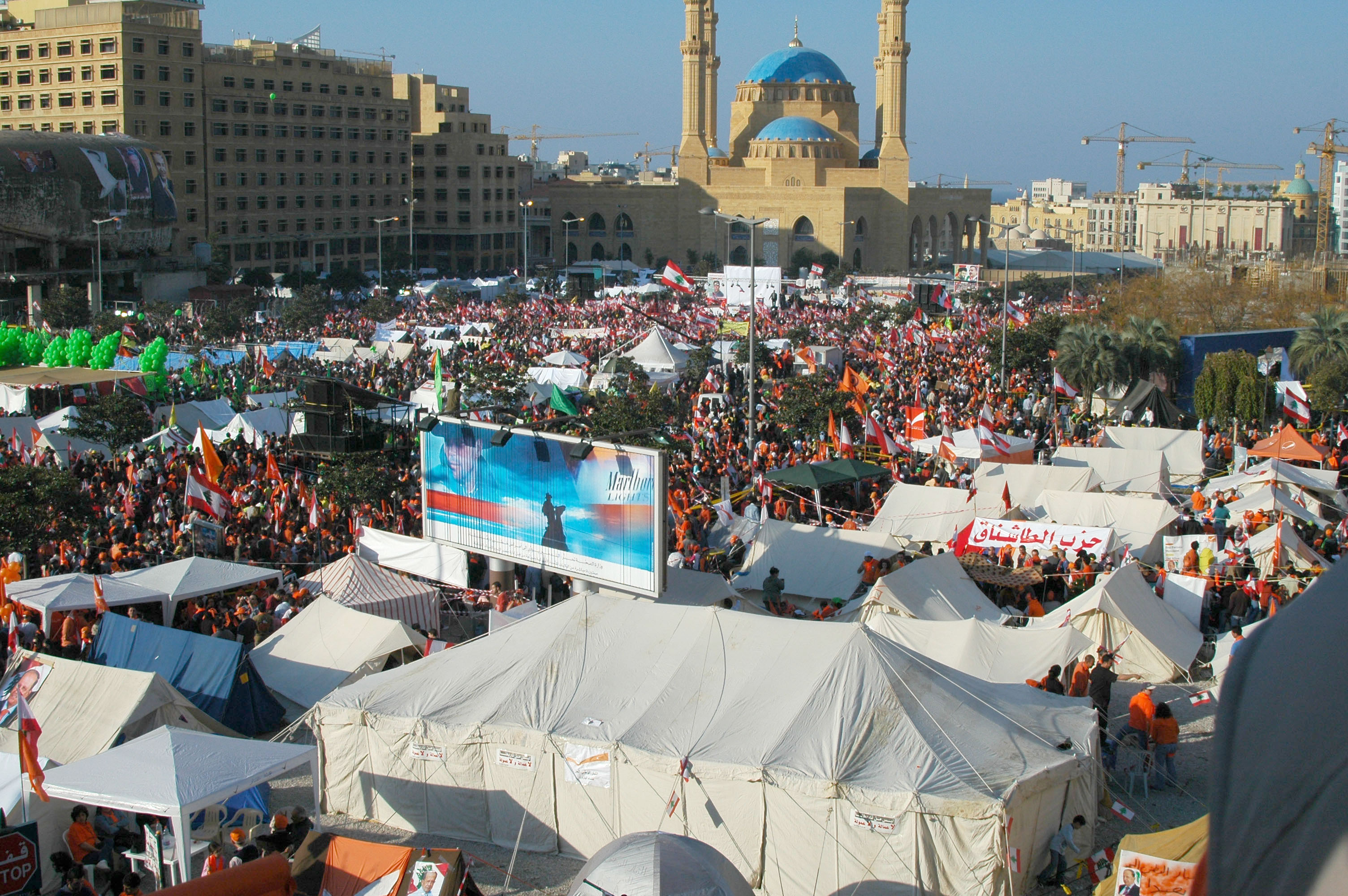
- Dec 10, 2006 anti-government rally in Beirut
- Date: 1 December 2006 – 21 May 2008
- Location: Lebanon
- Caused by: Special Tribunal for Lebanon; First Cabinet of Fouad Siniora; Cedar Revolution; 2006 Lebanon War
- Goals: Resignation of US-backed government; Formation of a national unity government; Early elections using 1960 election law
- Methods: Civil disobedience; Civil resistance; Demonstrations; Armed Rebellion
- Concessions: 2008 conflict in Lebanon; Doha Agreement

The 2006–2008 Lebanese protests were a series of political protests and sit-ins in Lebanon that began on 1 December 2006, led by groups that opposed the US and Saudi-backed government of Prime Minister Fouad Siniora and ended on 21 May 2008 with the signing of the Doha Agreement. The opposition was made up of Hezbollah, Amal, and the Free Patriotic Movement (FPM); a number of smaller parties were also involved, including the Marada party, the Lebanese Communist Party and the Syrian Social Nationalist Party. A majority of the members of the government were part of the anti-Syrian March 14 Alliance, a coalition of political parties and independents in Lebanon. The two groups were also divided along religious lines, with most Sunnis and Druze supporting the government, and most Shi'a supporting the opposition. The Christian community was split between the two factions, with Michel Aoun, the leader of the FPM, claiming to have more than 70% support among the Christians, based on the results of the 2005 parliamentary election.

The opposition, which had nearly 45% of the parliamentary seats, was seeking to create a national unity government, in which it demanded one more than one third of the Cabinet seats. This would give them veto power, as well as the ability to collapse the government. The government refused the demands. The opposition was also seeking to hold early parliamentary elections, hoping to remove the current majority held by the March 14 Alliance. Conversely, the March 14 Alliance majority was seeking to hold early presidential elections to replace pro-Syrian President Émile Lahoud. In the Lebanese political system, parliament elects the president. However, according to article 49 of the constitution, the President of Lebanon must receive two-thirds of the votes in the first session or an absolute majority of votes in subsequent sessions.

On 8 April 2007, Hassan Nasrallah, leader of the opposition, declared the situation deadlocked, but expressed an unwillingness to escalate the protests into a civil war. He suggested the status quo would continue until the regularly scheduled elections in 2009. Nevertheless, a new wave of sectarian violence started in Lebanon in May 2008. Responding to the government's crackdown on Hezbollah's secured network the militants belonging to the organization and its allies blocked Beirut airport as well as main city streets, paralyzing life in the capital. On 8 May 2008, gun battles erupted between Hezbollah supporters and pro-government loyalists, while the leader of the organization called the government's decision "a declaration of war".

Following one week of clashes in May 2008, leaders of both the opposition and majority signed the Doha Agreement on 21 May, defusing the 18-month crisis. The agreement called for the election of General Michel Sulaiman as president and the formation of a national unity government under Fouad Siniora.

== Background ==
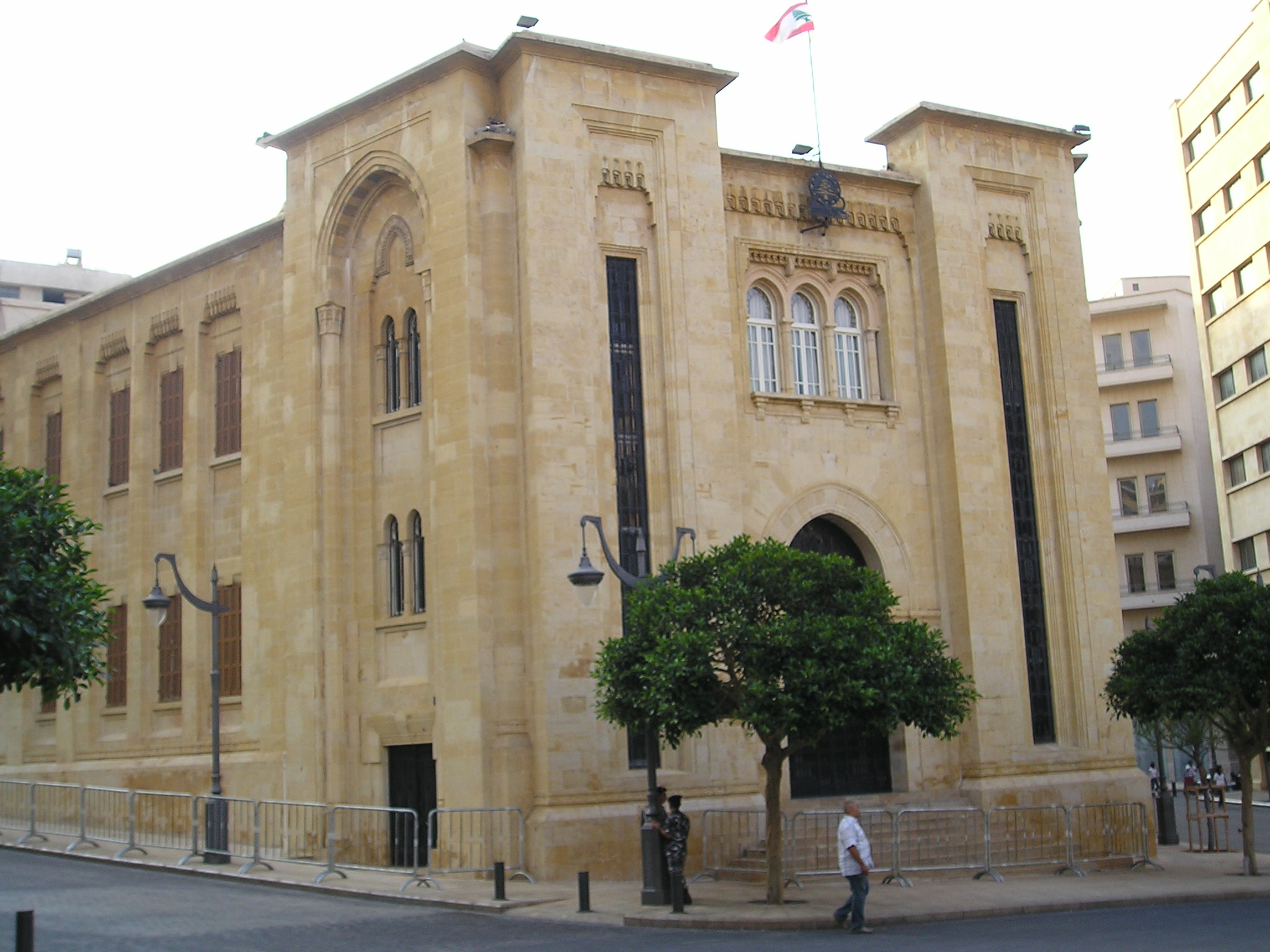
The Lebanese Parliament in downtown Beirut. This is where national unity government talks were held.

Following the Cedar Revolution and subsequent elections in July 2005, anti-Syrian and pro-American politicians held the majority of the twenty four seats in Prime Minister Fouad Siniora's cabinet, as well as the majority of the democratically elected parliament. Pro-Syrian and the Aoun Movement politicians held a minority of the seats in both the Cabinet of Ministers and the Parliament. Even though they held a majority, the pro-US group were not able to secure a two-thirds majority. Unlike other democracies, Lebanon cannot be ruled by a simple majority.

The anti-Syrian politicians were primarily members of the March 14 Alliance led by Saad Hariri, son of assassinated former Prime Minister Rafik Hariri, Lebanese Forces leader Samir Geagea, and PSP leader Walid Jumblatt, amongst others. The opposition politicians were primarily members of anti-Syrian and Michel Aoun's Free Patriotic Movement, pro-Syrian Hassan Nasrallah's Hezbollah, and Nabih Berri's Amal Movement.

As political division in Lebanon persisted, Speaker of the Parliament Nabih Berri and thirteen other Lebanese leaders from various religious groups and political affiliations convened a "National Dialogue" conference on 2 March 2006, with the aim of addressing issues ranging from the status of President Émile Lahoud to the assassinations of prominent Lebanese figures, and the disputed border region of Shebaa farms, being held by Israel. Also on the agenda, the establishment of diplomatic relations with Syria.

On July 12, 2006, a Hezbollah raid across the Israeli border resulted in the capture of two soldiers and the deaths of three others, setting off the 2006 Lebanon War between Hezbollah paramilitary forces and the Israeli army that lasted 34 days. The conflict resulted in the deaths of over 1,100 Lebanese, the majority of whom were civilians, and the destruction of a significant amount of national civilian infrastructure, including Rafiq Hariri International Airport.

However, due to the failure of Israeli forces to eliminate Hezbollah's leadership, halt Katyusha rockets and mortar attacks on northern Israel, did not rescue its two captured soldiers, Hezbollah declared victory. By resisting destruction at the hands of a far more powerful opponent, Hezbollah's support in Lebanon increased significantly amongst sectors of the population. The ruling government, by contrast, was seen by some as impotent in comparison, for its failure to effectively combat the Israeli forces.

Syria and its allies declared the ruling government illegitimate, prevented the parliament from meeting and would not allow presidential elections to replace Emile Lahoud, who left office in November 2007. The Syrian Muhabarat acted through the Fatah al-Islam in the Palestinian refugee camps of northern Lebanon to disrupt the Sunni community and the Lebanese army. This may have been related to Bashar al-Assad's objections to the Special Tribunal for Lebanon (Asad reportedly told Ban Ki-moon in April 2007 that "Instability would intensify if the Special tribunal were established).

== Before the protest ==
=== Timeline ===
- October 21, 2006 – The United Nations sent a draft plan for the creation of the Special Tribunal for Lebanon to try suspects in the assassination of former Prime Minister Rafik Hariri to the Lebanese government.
- October 27, 2006 – Speaker of the Lebanese Parliament Nabih Berri called for a resumption of the March 2 "National Dialogue" among all of Lebanon's political leaders, set to begin three days later on October 30, 2006. The day before the conference, he delayed the talks one week, citing the absence of several important officials.
- October 30, 2006 – In a televised interview on Al-Manar, Hezbollah Secretary General Sayyed Hassan Nasrallah warned of "street demonstrations" to demand early elections if the National Dialogue conference failed to form a national unity government. He said Hezbollah and its allies should have at least a third of the Cabinet, which would give it veto power.
- November 1, 2006 – The United States warned of a plot amid "mounting evidence" that Syria, Iran, and Hezbollah were planning to topple the Lebanese government in order to stop the creation of the Hariri tribunal. Syria's ambassador to the US rejected the allegations as "ridiculous" and added "We, in Syria, respect the sovereignty of Lebanon", while an Iranian Foreign Ministry spokesman said the claims were "aimed to create divisions among Lebanese people and their government." Hezbollah said the US backing of the government of Prime Minister Fouad Siniora was "a blatant interference" in Lebanon's internal affairs, and vowed to pursue its demand for a national unity government.
- November 11, 2006 – The five Shi'a Ministers resigned from the Cabinet; one independent, two from Hezbollah, and two from the Amal Movement. A sixth Cabinet Minister also resigned from the Cabinet. Prime Minister Fouad Siniora rejected all six resignations. Nevertheless, two days later, the remaining eighteen Cabinet Ministers unanimously approved a draft accord outlining the creation of an international tribunal to try suspects in the assassination of Rafik Hariri, sending it to the Security Council for endorsement. Pro-Syrian leaders in Lebanon argued that the Cabinet did not have the authority to approve the accord because it lacked the sectarian representation called for in the Lebanese constitution.
- November 19, 2006 – Hassan Nasrallah gave a speech telling his followers to be "psychologically" ready for protests, and demanding the formation of a national unity government. He insisted that the protests should remain peaceful.
- November 21, 2006 – Lebanon's Industry Minister Pierre Amine Gemayel was assassinated in his car by gunmen in Jdeideh, a Christian neighborhood on the outskirts of Beirut, bringing the Cabinet one seat closer to the nine empty seats that would force it to collapse. He was a young, outspoken opponent of Syria's occupation of Lebanon and its influence in the country. Analysts said Gemayel's death was likely to worsen tensions in the already divided country. Hours after the assassination, the Security Council approved the draft accord for the creation of the Hariri tribunal, sending it to the Lebanese government for final approval.
- November 23, 2006 – An estimated 800,000 people attended the funeral of Pierre Gemayel, turning it into a political rally against Syria and its supporters.
- November 25, 2006 – The seventeen remaining Cabinet Ministers approved the creation of the Hariri tribunal. However, President Émile Lahoud called the vote "null and void", deeming the Cabinet unconstitutional due to its lack of Shi'a representation. In addition, the Speaker of the Parliament and leader of Amal, Nabih Berri, was not expected to bring the matter before the Parliament for a vote on the same constitutionality grounds. Both Hassan Nasrallah and Nabih Berri, the leaders of Hezbollah and Amal, respectively, stated that they supported the creation of the tribunal, despite their opposition to the Cabinet that passed the accord supporting it.
- November 26, 2006 – Sheik Naim Qassem, Hezbollah's Deputy Secretary-General, told Al-Manar television that Hezbollah would not provide the government with advance notice of when it would begin protests.
- November 30, 2006 – On the eve of the protest, Hassan Nasrallah, issued a televised message through Al-Manar, urging his supporters to take to the street and start a series of peaceful protests against the government. In his speech, Nasrallah had cited the need for a "national unity" government, in order to "preserve Lebanon's independence and its sovereignty, prevent Lebanon from falling under any foreign tutelage, to strengthen the foundations of security, stability and civil peace, to cooperate in addressing the suffocating social and economic crisis, to address the political crises through true representation of all Lebanese movements and groups, to give real participation in the country's administration and to deal with various crises and face various existing challenges local, regional and international."

== The protest ==
=== Timeline ===
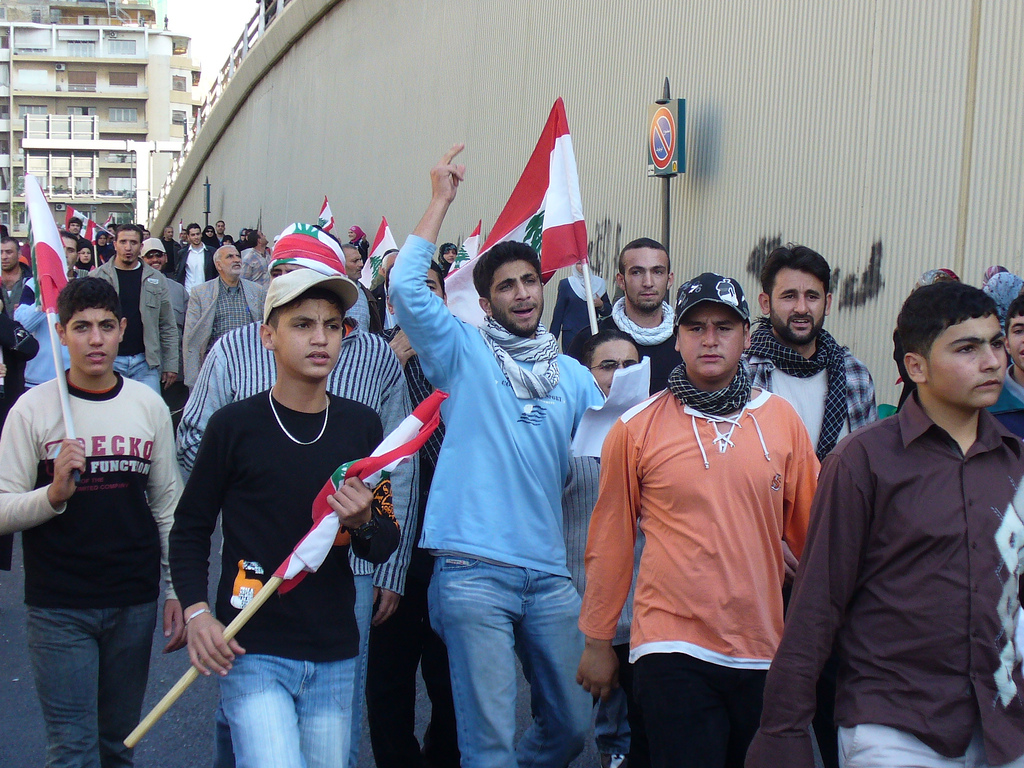
Lebanese opposition demonstration on December 1, 2006

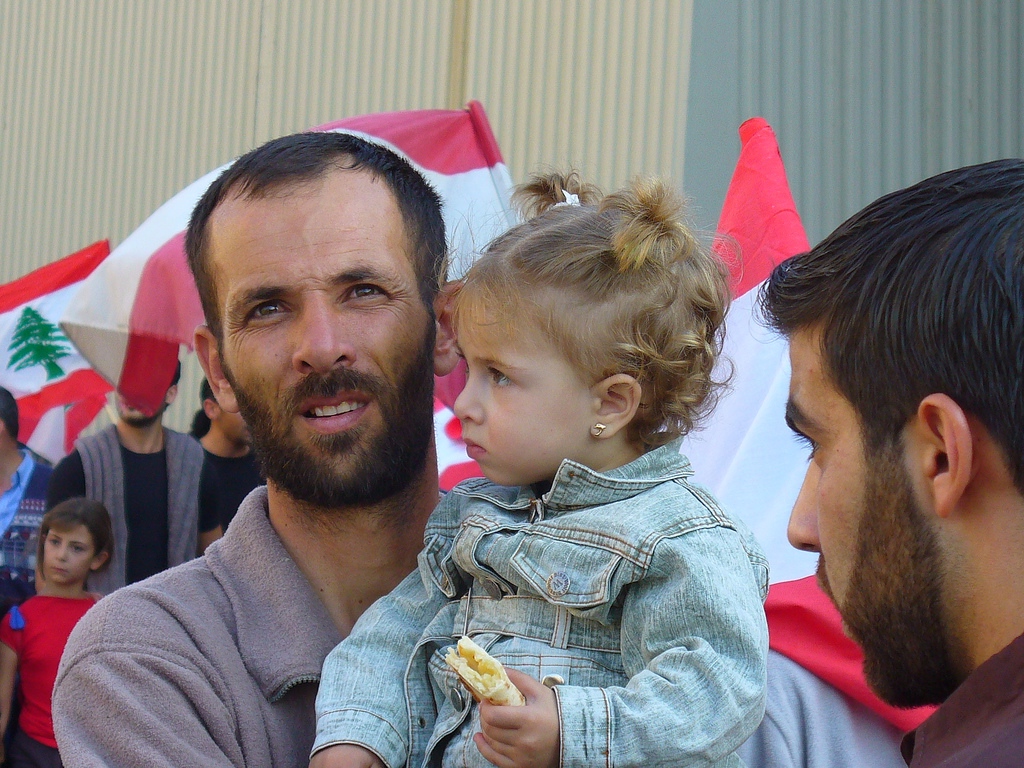
Father and daughter during the demonstration on December 1, 2006

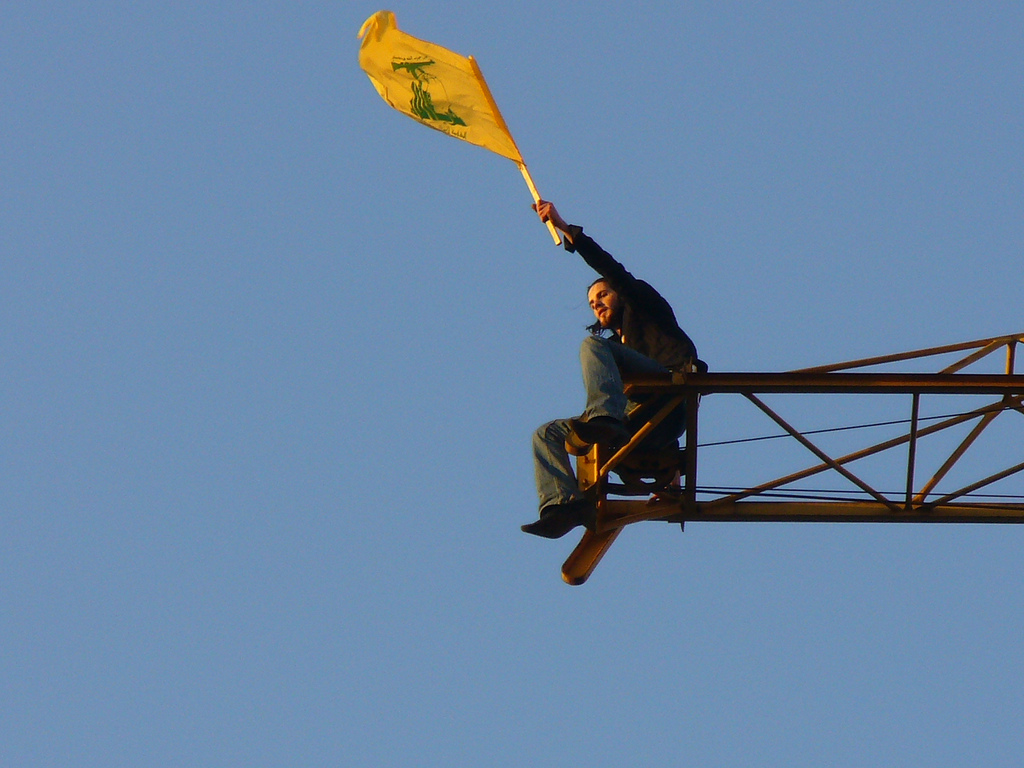
Man waving the flag of Hezbollah, December 1, 2006

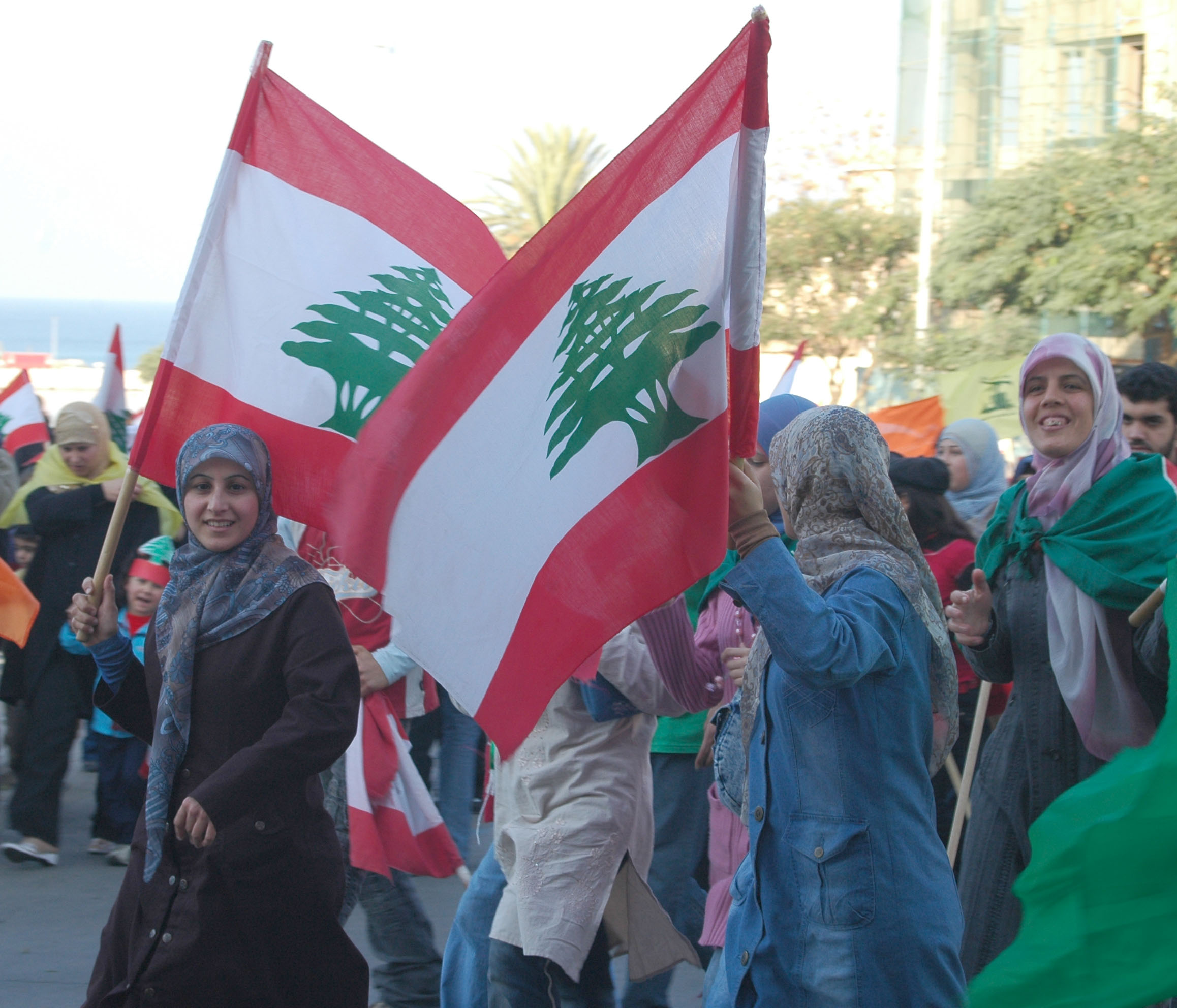
Women carrying Lebanese flags, Dec 10, 2006

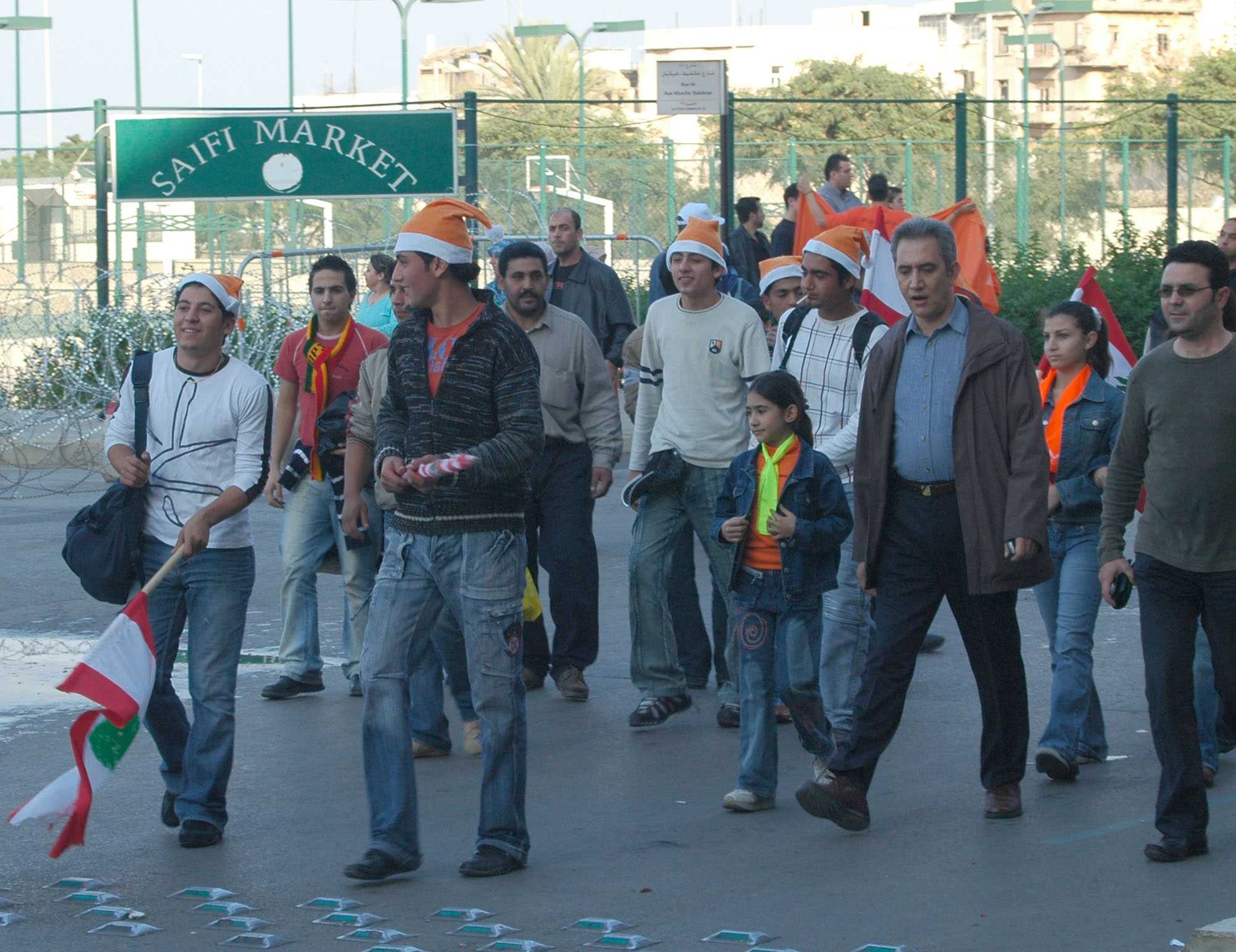
Aoun supporters wearing orange elf hats, December 10, 2006

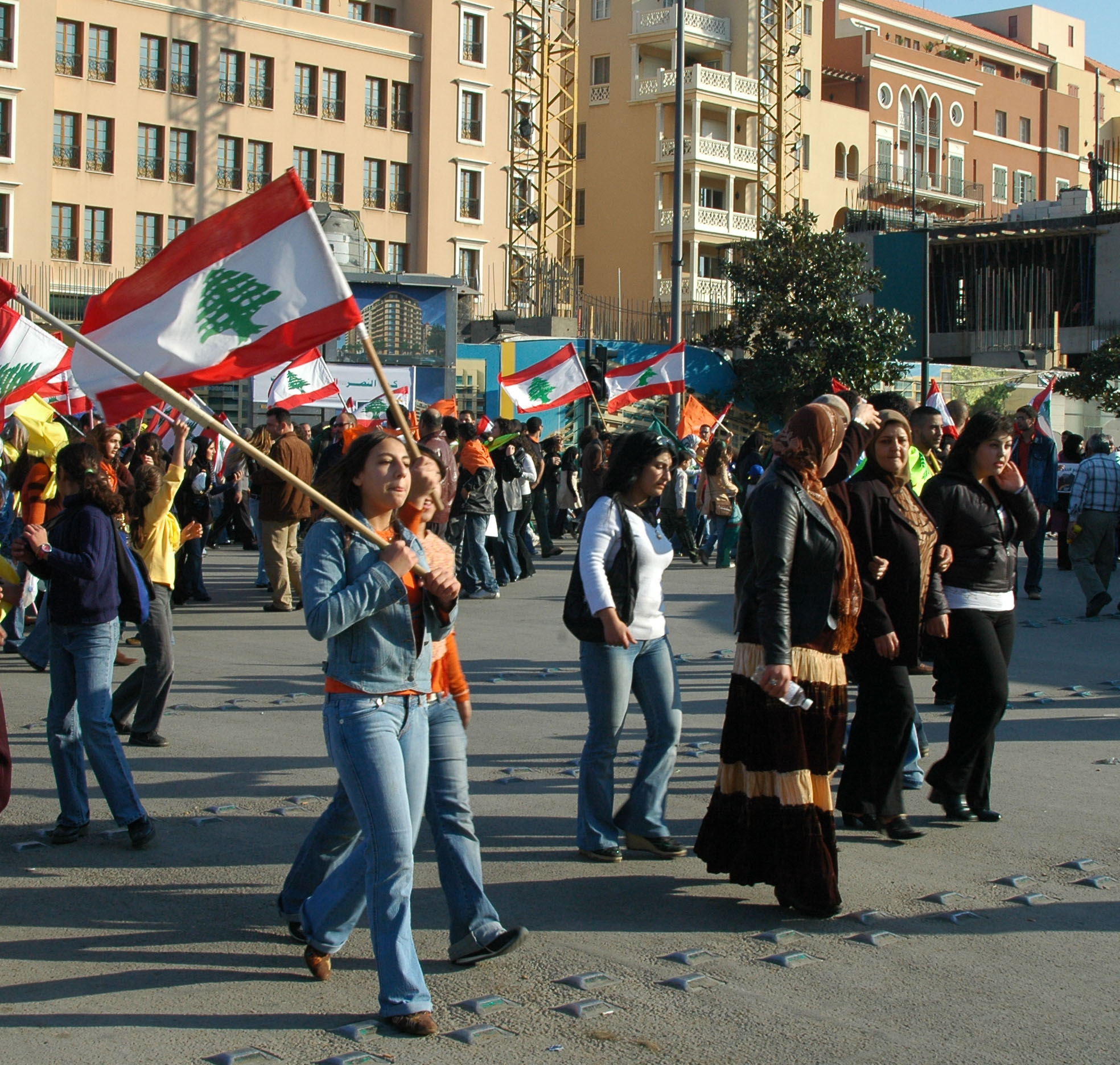
Protestors on December 10, 2006

- December 1, 2006 – Hundreds of thousands of demonstrators amassed peacefully in downtown Beirut. Police estimated the crowd to number approximately 800,000, while Hezbollah claimed it was larger. By nighttime, several thousand protesters remained to begin a sit-in, setting up tents and vowing not to leave until Prime Minister Fouad Siniora resigned.
- December 3, 2006 – Violent clashes between pro-government and anti-government groups flared up in Beirut, stoking fears of a possible civil war. The clashes claimed the life of 21-year-old Amal supporter, Ahmad Ali Mahmoud, and left 21 others injured. Al-Manar, a Hezbollah-run television station, reported that Future Movement militiamen were responsible of Mahmoud's death.
- December 5, 2006 – Ahmad Mahmoud was laid to rest in the "Two Martyrs" cemetery in Beirut. His coffin was paraded past the Grand Serail where Fouad Siniora and the remaining Cabinet Ministers have been living since the beginning of the protests. During the funeral, procession protesters continued to demand the ousting of the government, shouting "Death to Siniora", while their leadership tried to prevent revenge attacks. Siniora warned his supporters that the situation could get out of control. Lebanon's Army commander Gen. Michel Suleiman urged politicians to compromise and warned that the military may not be able to contain further protests, despite the deployment of thousands of soldiers.
- December 7, 2006 – Hassan Nasrallah issued a televised speech calling on supporters to take to the streets on December 10, 2006, to mark "a historic and decisive" demonstration in central Beirut and intensify the pressure on Prime Minister Fouad Siniora. He emphasized that the protest was "peaceful and civilized", and demanded that the death of Ahmad Mahmoud should not be served as an excuse for violence. He also claimed the government had conspired with Israel and ordered the Lebanese Army to seize weapons being delivered to Hezbollah, and calling for an independent committee to investigate events during the conflict. He said that unnamed members of the government had asked US envoys to get Israel to destroy Hezbollah because "the Lebanese couldn't," and had tried to help Israeli forces determine his whereabouts during the war. Prime Minister Siniora denied the accusations of collaborating with the Israelis, an incendiary charge in the Arab world, and told cheering supporters that Nasrallah was threatening a coup. Despite the politically charged crisis, schools and businesses in Lebanon remained open, indicating a certain level of normalcy.
- December 8, 2006 – Shi'a and Sunni Muslims prayed together in front of the Mohammed al-Amin Mosque in Downtown Beirut. A former Sunni parliament member and leader of a small pro-opposition Sunni group, Fathi Yakan, led them in prayers to show Muslim unity and dispel fears of sectarian strife and urging national unity. "This mass protest is not for Shiites or for Sunnis or any other sect. It is for all of Lebanon," he said, accusing the government of being an agent of the United States.
- December 9, 2006 – Lebanon's pro-Syrian President Émile Lahoud rejected the proposal to create the Hariri tribunal, citing the Cabinet as unconstitutional. The Cabinet is expected to seek parliamentary approval for the tribunal without the President's signature, however Nabih Berri, the Speaker of the Parliament and leader of the pro-Syrian opposition group Amal, is not expected to convene the Parliament for a vote, citing similar unconstitutionality grounds.
- December 10, 2006 – Nearly one million Lebanese opposition supporters took part in continued anti-government protests in Beirut. Tens of thousands of pro-government supporters staged a counter-rally in the city of Tripoli in northern Lebanon. In an interview with Dubai-based Al-Arabiya television, Mustafa Ismail, a Hezbollah envoy, said that Nasrallah accepted in principle an Arab League plan to stabilize the Lebanese political crisis. According to the plan, the number of ministers in the Lebanese government would grow to 30; two thirds representing the parliamentary majority, one-third representing the opposition. The plan would also give the new government power to establish a new international court for the investigation of the assassination of former Prime Minister Rafik Hariri. Prime Minister Fouad Siniora said "We don't want Lebanon to be an arena of the wars of others." Lebanese Ministers, under siege by protesters, have been sleeping in Ministry offices and doing laundry in the bathrooms. Also, Syria was reported to be supplying Hezbollah with arms. Meanwhile, an opinion poll published in Al-Akhbar on December 12 showed 73% support for the establishment of a national unity government, with opinion evenly divided on the opposition claim that the government had lost its legitimacy.
- December 13, 2006 – Hezbollah's spokesperson circulated a letter claimed to have been written by Saad Hariri during the recent conflict, requesting that Hassan Nasrallah disarm Hezbollah in exchange for an end to the Israeli siege of the country. However, Hariri's representatives denied the letter, claiming it was misquoted and merged the content of two separate messages.
- December 18, 2006 – Government supporters organized a counter protest outside Beirut. "We will not allow anyone to obstruct our economy and our government," Lebanese Forces MP George Adwan told thousands of government supporters in Deir al-Qamar.
- January 23, 2007 – Opposition protesters paralyzed Lebanon by burning tires and cars on major thoroughfares in and around the capital, enforcing a general strike called for by the opposition. Police and troops, deployed in the thousands across the country, worked to open roads, sometimes negotiating with protesters, but refrained from using force. Nonetheless, riots and clashes left three dead, and 133 injured. Two of the casualties were bodyguards of former MP and member of the March 14 majority Fares Soaid.
- January 25, 2007 – Following the relative calm of January 24, Sunni and Shiite students clashed violently at the Beirut Arab University, which escalated into civil unrest in parts of Beirut. Four people were killed while over a hundred and fifty were injured. As a result, the Lebanese Armed Forces declared an overnight curfew. According to Hezbollah-owned Al-Manar, the shooting was started by pro-government militiamen.
- April 26, 2007 – After being kidnapped the previous Monday (April 23), two individuals (one a boy of 12) are found dead beside a freeway just south of Beirut in Jdara. Both come from families belonging to Walid Jumblat's Progressive Socialist Party. The killings looked to be reprisals for the death of a member of the opposing Amal Movement during the January 25 riot.

== Arab League meetings ==
Amr Moussa, the Arab League secretary-general, called on Saudi Arabia's King Abdullah to intervene to help Lebanon's deepening political crisis. Having been to the country with Moussa later on, the Arab League presidential envoy, Osman Ismail, said a road map had been set up to deal with the situation in Lebanon. However, according to many analysts, it was described as being rigged with mines that could explode anytime. And ultimately, Fouad Siniora stated that Lebanon was witnessing a very difficult moment in its history.

We have reached a deadlock and cannot seem to agree on any of the outstanding issues.

== Economic impact ==
The ongoing protests were estimated to cost the Lebanese economy approximately $70 million a day, or $560 million thus far, according to Lebanon's Economy Minister, Jihad Azour. Stores and restaurants in Beirut were forced to keep their doors closed, and the pedestrian streets were deserted. With the holiday season coming up, including Christmas for the large Christian community, and Eid ul-Adha on December 27 for the Muslim community, businesses fear losing even more income due to the political crisis. Tourism, one of the largest sectors of the economy, which had still not fully recovered from the 2006 Israel-Hezbollah conflict, was also adversely impacted from the mounting tensions after the November 21, 2006 assassination of Cabinet Minister Pierre Gemayel. With Lebanon being a popular holiday destination, businesses also fear that the drop in tourism will further impact their business, with Paul Achkar, head of the Lebanese hotel association, stating that hotel occupancy is currently 25% of normal.

In March 2007, Standard Chartered Bank published a report that expressed concern about the ability of Prime Minister Fouad Siniora's government to push for fiscal and economic reforms amid the acute political division in the country.

== Position of foreign governments ==
=== Egypt, Saudi Arabia and Jordan ===
On November 27, 2006, King Abdullah II of Jordan warned that the world might witness three civil wars in 2007 – one in Iraq, one in the Palestinian territories, and one in Lebanon.

As the protest began, leaders in Egypt, Saudi Arabia and Jordan publicly supported Siniora. Egyptian President Hosni Mubarak told French television that the opposition was being unreasonable. "There is also the risk of outside interference in these demonstrations. That can lead to very serious confrontations and even lead to the destruction of Lebanon," he said.

=== Israel ===
On December 5, 2006, the Israeli government considered redeploying troops in Lebanon, without regard for the UNIFIL forces already in the country, if the Hezbollah-led protest succeeds in toppling the current Lebanese government. An Israeli government staff and a journalist from the Jerusalem Post warned that the goal of both Hezbollah and its sponsor, Iran, if achieved, could lead to negative results beyond Israel.

== See also ==
- Cedar Revolution
- 2011 Lebanese protests
- 2015 Lebanese protests
