= CYBA =

CYBA or Cyba may refer to:

- CYBA (gene), the human gene that encodes Cytochrome b-245, alpha polypeptide
- Cyba Audi (born 1965), Lebanese communication strategist and entrepreneur
- Banff Airport
