= Future TV =

Lebanese television channel

Future Television
- Country: Lebanon
- Broadcast area: Worldwide
- Headquarters: Beirut, Lebanon

Programming
- Languages: Arabic; Armenian; French; English
- Picture format: 576i (SDTV)
- Timeshift service: Future International

Ownership
- Sister channels: Future News

History
- Launched: 15 February 1993

Links
- Website: future.com.lb

Availability

Terrestrial
- Nilesat: UHF service
- Bell Fibe TV: Channel 743 (SD) 4:3
- Cablevision (Lebanon): Back to Basic package - General (free-to-air)

Streaming media
- Cablevision+ (IPTV in Lebanon): Channel No. 9 - General

Future Television (Arabic: تلفزيون المستقبل, Televizyon al-Mustaqbal) is a Lebanese free-to-air television station founded in 1993 by the Future Movement leader Rafic Hariri, a former Prime Minister of Lebanon. Future TV was also available via satellite in the Arab world, United Kingdom, European Union, United States, Canada, and Australia, but is currently broadcast on a frequency of the Lebanese satellite service provider Cablevision. Politically, the channel supported the views of the Future Movement. The channel also had a sister channel, Future News, which remains defunct.

== History ==
Future Television is a Lebanese owned and operated company founded in 1993. In October 1994, Future Television started a trial satellite broadcasting over the footprint of Arabsat 1D. Shortly after, Future International was launched on the Arabsat 2A transponder. In 1996, in compliance with the new Lebanese audio visual law, Future Television restructured its ownership. Future Television presently has around 90 new shareholders.

Future Television was forced into closing on 9 May, during the 2008 Lebanon conflict. After moving its broadcasting headquarters, the station was back on the air on 13 May at 4:30 p.m (Lebanese Local Time). On 16 May, the station went back to its original offices.

In September 2019, Lebanese Prime Minister Saad Hariri announced the suspension of work at his Future TV satellite television channel after 26 years of broadcasting, citing financial reasons for halting operations.

In a statement issued 18 September by his media office, Hariri said: “It is with a heavy heart that I announce today the decision to suspend work at Future TV and settle workers’ wages for the same financial reasons that led to the closing of Al-Mustaqbal newspaper. The decision was not an easy one for me or for the men and women of the Future Movement nor is it for the generation of the founding personnel and the millions of Lebanese and Arab viewers of Future TV who had stayed loyal to the station for more than a quarter of a century”.

The decision highlights the worsening financial crisis in which Hariri was trapped since the dissolution of Saudi-Oger, his father's construction and services company in Saudi Arabia. The company had been the pillar of the Hariri family fortune.

Future Television still broadcasts terrestrially, albeit to retain its license, airing reruns of its programs.

== Competitors ==
The main and direct competitors of Future TV are Murr Television and Lebanese Broadcasting Corporation

== Future Television brands ==
- Future TV Terrestrial: A localized channel dedicated to the whole Lebanese family, it was broadcast in Digital television format from Doha since 2003.
- Future TV International: The channel is dedicated to Lebanese citizens in the Arab world and Europe, currently broadcasting archived Future TV shows
- Future TV America & Australia: The channel is dedicated to Lebanese citizens in the Americas and Australia.

=== Defunct brands ===
- Zein TV: This channel had programs aimed at a younger adult audience, with discussions and content relevant to Arab youth. Reasons for shutting down this channel remain unclear.
- Future News: This channel used to air news and political programs. The channel shut down on 20 August 2012 because the channel changed into a brand new version it was merged with the main future.

== Programs ==
Future TV has produced many programs including SuperStar (Arabic version of Pop Idol), La Youmal لا يمل (a comedy/skit show), Miss Elite Top Model, El Halka Al-Ad'af (Arabic version of The Weakest Link), El Fakh (Arabic version of Cash Trapped), and Alakhbar (The News).

Its most famous talk show was Sireh wo infatahit سيرة وأنفتحت (Arabic for Open for Discussion). Future TV's longest running show was Khaleek bill bait خليك بالبيت (Arabic for Stay at Home). The show interviewed artists and intellectuals from the Arab World.

== Logos ==
Future TV original logo used from 15 February 1993 to 2003.

Future TV second logo used from 2003 to 2007.

Future TV third logo used from 2007 to 20 August 2012.

== Future TV personalities ==
=== Past ===
- Najwa Qassem
- Rima Maktabi

=== Present ===
- Zaven Kouyoumdjian
- Maya Zankoul

== Affiliated Media ==
Al-Mustaqbal newspaper, also owned by the Hariri family, closed its print operations in January for similar reasons, thus threatening the survival of Hariri's Future Movement as a political project while Hezbollah's media empire remained very active despite the militant group's own financial woes.
