= Zein TV =

Zein TV was a Lebanese satellite TV channel started as a joint venture between Future TV and Dubai Media City. It started broadcasting in 25 January 2001 targeting Arab youth.

The main TV program was Dardachat, a daily Live program featuring a group of young people sharing their knowledge and experience in life in different topics.

The channel shut down in 2004.
