= Lebanon–United Arab Emirates relations =

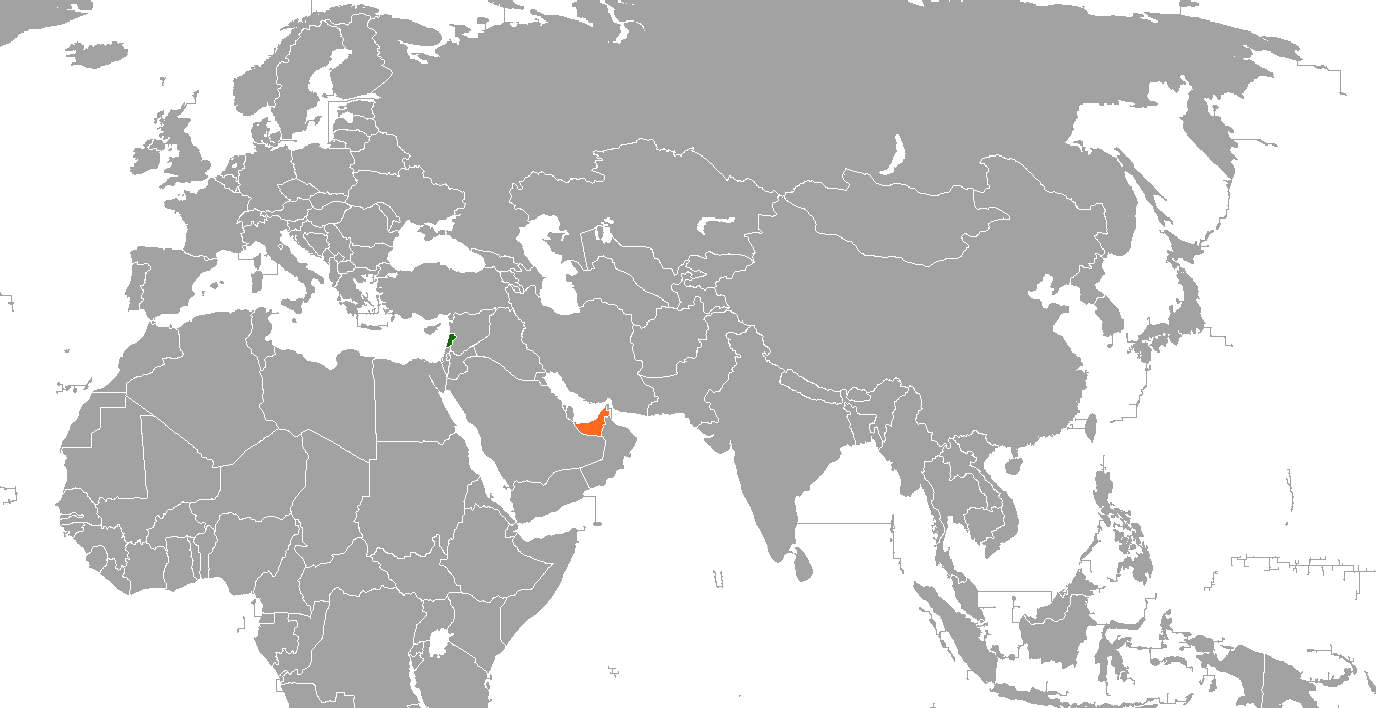

- Lebanon: United Arab Emirates

The United Arab Emirates has an embassy in Beirut, and Lebanon maintains an embassy in Abu Dhabi and a consulate-general in Dubai. Both countries are part of the Middle East region and share close cultural ties. There are hundreds of thousands of Lebanese expatriates living and working in the U.A.E.

In October 2021, the United Arab Emirates closed their embassy in Beirut over a controversy caused by the support of the Houthis in Yemen by the then Lebanese Minister of Information George Kordahi.

In January 2025, The United Arab Emirates has officially resumed diplomatic activities at its embassy in Beirut, Lebanon. Omar Obaid Al Shamsi, Under-Secretary of the Ministry of Foreign Affairs, emphasized that this move signifies an important step in advancing bilateral cooperation, reflecting the UAE's commitment to supporting Lebanon's stability and development. The reopening underscores the close fraternal ties between the two nations and enhances opportunities for collaboration across various sectors.

In April 2025 there was an official visit to the UAE, by Lebanon's President Joseph Aoun. He was received by President Sheikh Mohammed bin Zayed Al Nahyan, marking another step for enhancing bilateral ties and economic initiatives. On 7, May 2025, the UEA lifted the four year travel ban to Lebanon. A step that boosted tourism from the country in to Lebanon.

== Resident diplomatic missions ==
- Lebanon has an embassy in Abu Dhabi and a consulate-general in Dubai.
- the United Arab Emirates has an embassy in Beirut.

== See also ==
- Foreign relations of Lebanon
- Foreign relations of the United Arab Emirates
- Lebanese people in the United Arab Emirates
