= Future News =

Future News Official Logo

Future News was a Lebanese 24-hour news channel in Lebanon, covering local and international news. It was a sister channel of Future Television. Its motto was "Right to know". Future News broadcast from Hamra, Beirut.

== History ==
Future News was launched on 9 December 2007. It provided news to expatriate Lebanese.

The channel shut down on 20 August 2012.
