= Aytat =

Village in Aley District in the Mount Lebanon Governorate of Lebanon

Aitat
- Town
- Aitat shown within Lebanon
- Coordinates: 33°47′30″N 35°33′26″E
- Country: Lebanon
- Governorate: Mount Lebanon
- District: Aley
- City: Aley

Area
  - Total: 2.40 km^{2} (0.93 sq mi)
- Elevation: 630 m (2,070 ft)
- Time zone: UTC+2 (EET)
  - Summer (DST): UTC+3 (EEST)
- ISO 3166 code: LB

Aitat, or Aytat (Arabic: عيتات), is a town located 5 kilometres (3.1 mi) west of the town of Aley within the district of the same name in the Lebanese governorate of Mount Lebanon. It was a strategic place during the Lebanese Civil War (1975–1990), due to its view to Beirut.

== History ==
In 1838, Eli Smith noted the place, called Aithath, located in El-Ghurb el-Fokany, upper el-Ghurb.

With its neighboring Christian town of Souk El-Gharb, this town remains one of the most memorable places in Lebanon for the Druze and the Christians as a reminder the fierce and deadly battles that occurred during the Lebanese Civil War. Today Aitat and Souk El-Gharb are considered to be the symbol of unity and forgiveness.

The Abi Saab's, Timani's and Talhouq's, are the most well known families of Aitat and the Aley district.

== Bibliography ==
- Robinson, E.; Smith, E. (1841). Biblical Researches in Palestine, Mount Sinai and Arabia Petraea: A Journal of Travels in the year 1838. Vol. 3. Boston: Crocker & Brewster.
