= Beirut Arab University shooting =

2007 mass shooting in Lebanon

Coordinates: 33.8733°N 35.4969°E

The Beirut Arab University shooting happened on January 25, 2007, in the Beirut Arab University in the Lebanese capital.

== Incident ==
Four people were shot dead in clashes between pro- and anti-government activists on January 25 and about 200 were hurt in the violence that flared up after a scuffle between students at a Beirut university. The opposition accused the government camp of starting the riots and the four dead included two Hezbollah-affiliated students, who were fired at from rooftops.

Opposition backers said gunmen fired from apartment balconies near the school, wounding several people. Students said the clashes began with a scuffle in the cafeteria of Beirut Arab University and degenerated into a melee as youths in the surrounding Tarik el-Jadideh district moved in.

They threw rocks, set fire to tires to block traffic, torched cars and smashed windshields amid the rattle of gunshots as troops fired into the air to try to disperse the crowds. There were reports of gunfire and pictures showed masked men holding guns and assault-rifles.

== Response ==
Hezbollah secretary general Hassan Nasrallah went on TV in the evening to tell followers it was a "religious duty" to get off the streets to allow security forces to keep order.

"I call upon the Lebanese to cooperate with the Lebanese army in all districts to end the tension in this hard and painful hour for all the Lebanese," Nasrallah said in a broadcast audio message.

"I appeal to you in the name of Lebanon and human conscience. It's a pity to waste Lebanon like this," said Parliament Speaker Nabih Berri. "It is time we learn from the past."

Parliament majority leader Saad al-Hariri urged his loyalists to show restraint.

"I call on everyone to return to the voice of reason," said Prime Minister Fouad Siniora, speaking from Paris where he was at an aid conference.

United States ambassador Jeffrey Feltman was quick to point the finger at Syria.

"History has shown that outside powers like Syria have done it before. And I can't give you solid evidence, but one can certainly make a pretty strong case that it's Syria's hands at work again," he said on US-funded Al-Hurra television.

MP Walid Jumblatt of the parliamentary majority added voice to Feltman's accusation, saying the fighting was triggered by Syrian President Bashar al-Assad.

== Context ==
The opposition launched nationwide protests on Tuesday which shut down much of Lebanon before being attacked by assailants. The attack sparked violence in which three people were killed and 176 wounded.

The general strike intensified a street campaign that began on December 1 when opposition supporters began camping out near Siniora's offices in downtown Beirut.

They are backing demands for the Western-backed government to give in to the formation of a government of national unity and early parliamentary elections or quit.

Siniora and his main backer, parliamentary majority leader Hariri, have refused to give in to the demands.
