= Doha Agreement (2008) =

Agreement reached in Qatar between rival Lebanese factions

The Doha Agreement was reached by rival Lebanese factions on 21 May 2008 in Doha, Qatar to end an 18-month-long political crisis.

After battles broke out in Lebanon because of the ongoing political crisis, Emir Sheikh Hamad bin Khalifa Al Thani, the ruling Emir of Qatar from 1995 to 2013, invited all Lebanese political parties to Qatar's capital of Doha to seek an end to the conflict and avoid possible all-out civil war.

== Before the Doha Agreement ==
Lebanon's ongoing political crisis suddenly exploded when the government made the decisions to remove Hezbollah's telecommunications network and dismiss the Rafik Hariri International Airport's head of security, after it was revealed that a Hezbollah surveillance camera was monitoring the western runway number 17, which is used primarily for executive jets.

In response to these decisions, mushrooming riots swept across Beirut resulting in heavy clashes between Hezbollah and the majority. Afterward, Hezbollah forces invaded and took control of the majority Sunni area of western Beirut. It was the first time since the Lebanese Civil War (1975-1990) that weapons were used by Hezbollah on an internal front. Battles moved to several areas in the country, including Mount Lebanon and the North, and 300 people are estimated to have died in the conflict.

The Arab League quickly acted to stop the violence. Under its guidance, Lebanese political leaders convened at the Lebanese National Dialogue Conference in Doha between 16 and 21 May 2008.

== Provisions ==
First: The parties have agreed on having the Lebanese parliament speaker, based on the rules in effect, invite the parliament to convene within 24 hours to elect consensus candidate General Michel Suleiman, knowing that this is the best constitutional method to elect the president under these exceptional circumstances.

Second: forming a national unity government composed of 30 ministers distributed among the majority (16 ministers), the opposition (11 ministers) and the president (3 ministers), and by virtue of this agreement, all parties commit not to resign or obstruct the government's actions.

Third: adopting the kaza as an electoral constituency in conformity with the 1960 law, whereby the districts of Marjayoun-Hasbaya, Baalbek-Hermel and West Bekaa-Rashaya remain as a single electoral constituency each.

As for Beirut, it was divided in the following manner:

The first district: Achrafieh – Rmeil – Saifi; The second district: Bachoura – Medawar – the Port; The third district: Minet al-Hosn – Ain al-Mreisseh – Al-Mazraa – Mousseitbeh – Ras Beirut – Zoqaq al-Blat

Agreeing on referring the reform clauses mentioned in the draft law prepared by the National Commission on Electoral Law Reform, which was headed by Minister Fouad Boutros, to the parliament in order to examine and discuss them in accordance with the rules in effect.

Fourth: Pursuant to the Beirut Agreement of 15 May, especially Paragraphs 4 and 5, which stated the following:

Paragraph 4: The parties commit to abstain from having recourse or resuming the use of weapons and violence in order to record political gains.

Paragraph 5: Initiate a dialogue on promoting the Lebanese state's authority over all Lebanese territory and their relationship with the various groups on the Lebanese stage in order to ensure the state's and the citizens’ security.

Hence, the dialogue was initiated in Doha on promoting the state's authority according to Paragraph 5 of the Beirut Agreement, and an agreement was reached on the following:

- Prohibiting the use of weapons or violence or taking refuge in them in any dispute whatsoever and under any circumstances, in order to ensure respect for the national partnership contract, based on the Lebanese people's commitment to live with one another within the framework of the Lebanese system, and to restrict the security and military authority over Lebanese nationals and residents to the state alone so as to ensure the continuity of the coexistence formula and civil peace among all the Lebanese; and the parties pledge to all of the above.

- Implementing the law and upholding the sovereignty of the state throughout Lebanon so as not to have regions that serve as safe havens for outlaws, out of respect for the supremacy of the law, and referring all those who commit crimes and contraventions to the Lebanese judiciary.

This dialogue is to be resumed under the aegis of the president as soon as he is elected and a national unity government is formed, and with the participation of the Arab League in such a way as to boost confidence among the Lebanese.

Fifth: Reasserting the commitment of the Lebanese political leaders to immediately abstain from resorting to the rhetoric of treason or political or sectarian instigation.

The Arab Ministerial Committee undertakes to register this agreement before the Arab League General Secretariat as soon as it is signed.

The agreement was signed in Doha on May 21, 2008 by the Lebanese political leaders participating in the Conference and in the presence of the president and members of the Arab Ministerial Committee.”

== International support ==
The UN Security Council welcomed the deal reached by Lebanon's majority and opposition blocs to end an 18-month political standoff and elect a new president. The UN “welcomes and strongly supports the agreement reached by Lebanese leaders in Doha on May 21..., which constitutes an essential step towards the resolution of the current crisis... and the complete restoration of Lebanon's unity, stability and independence.” In a non-binding statement adopted by all 15 members, the Security Council also “welcomes the agreement to ban the use of weapons and violence as a means to settle disputes, irrespective of their nature and under any circumstances.” It hailed the agreement between the Western-backed majority and the Hezbollah-led opposition, backed by Syria and Iran, to elect a new president, establish a national unity cabinet and address Lebanon's electoral law. The Council reaffirmed “its strong support for the territorial integrity, sovereignty, unity and political independence of Lebanon within its internationally recognized borders and under the sole and exclusive authority of the government of Lebanon over all Lebanese territory.” The statement also recalled previous Security Council resolutions calling for the dismantling and the disarming of all Lebanese and foreign militias.

Individual countries also supported the agreement:

- The agreement was welcomed by France, with President Nicolas Sarkozy saying that it was "great success for Lebanon and all the Lebanese, whose courage and patience never failed despite the ordeals they have been through." French Foreign Minister Bernard Kouchner said though the agreement failed to tackle the root of the political crisis, yet was a first step. "It goes in the right direction, but none of the essence (of the crisis) appears to have been resolved. Yet, it is better to have a president and a (functioning) government," he said. France's UN Ambassador Jean-Maurice Ripert, for his part, saw the deal as “a foundation upon which Lebanon and its national unity can be rebuilt and its sovereignty as well as territorial integrity reinforced.”
- Germany welcomed the agreement.
- Iranian Foreign Ministry spokesperson welcomed the agreement and said “Iran hopes the Doha agreement will give the Lebanese a bright future.”
- Saudi Arabia supported the agreement and its ambassador to Lebanon said "Saudi Arabia announces its support for the agreement. We are very happy that this accord has been reached.”
- Syria welcomed the agreement.
- The United States praised the agreement. "The United States welcomes the agreement reached by Lebanese leaders in Doha, Qatar. We view this agreement as a positive step towards resolving the current crisis by electing a President, forming a new government, and addressing Lebanon’s electoral law, consistent with the Arab League initiative. The United States supports the government of Lebanon and its complete authority over the entire territory of the country," U.S. Secretary of State Condoleezza Rice told reporters. US President George Bush released a statement saying he hoped the new agreement would “usher in an era of political reconciliation to the benefit of all Lebanese.”
- Britain's UN Ambassador John Sawers, the council chair this month, expressed hope that the Doha deal “will bring to an end a dispute that has been going on for far too long.” He also hoped that “in the coming days, we will see implementation of this agreement and that the painstaking process of rebuilding Lebanese unity can begin.”

== Reactions ==
Lebanese across the political spectrum greeted it with relief and joy. The opposition ended its sit-in which had begun on 1 December 2006 in Beirut. After the agreement, the opposition barricades were dismantled and so were the opposition protest camps in Martyrs' Square.

On 25 May 2008, Lebanon's parliament elected General Michel Suleiman as the new president of the country, a post that had been vacant since November.

After electing President Michel Suleiman, fireworks erupted all over the country, and festivals were held all over Beirut.

== See also ==
- Foreign relations of Qatar

== Sources ==
- Daher, Aurélie (2019). Hezbollah - Mobilisation and Power. Translated by Randolph, H.W. Oxford University Press. ISBN 978-0-1904-9589-3.
- Fregonese, Sara (2019). "A demarcation in the hearts". Routledge Handbook on Middle East Cities (PDF). Routledge, University of Birmingham. doi:10.4324/9781315625164-12. ISBN 9781315625164.
