= Rima Maktabi =

Lebanese TV presenter and journalist

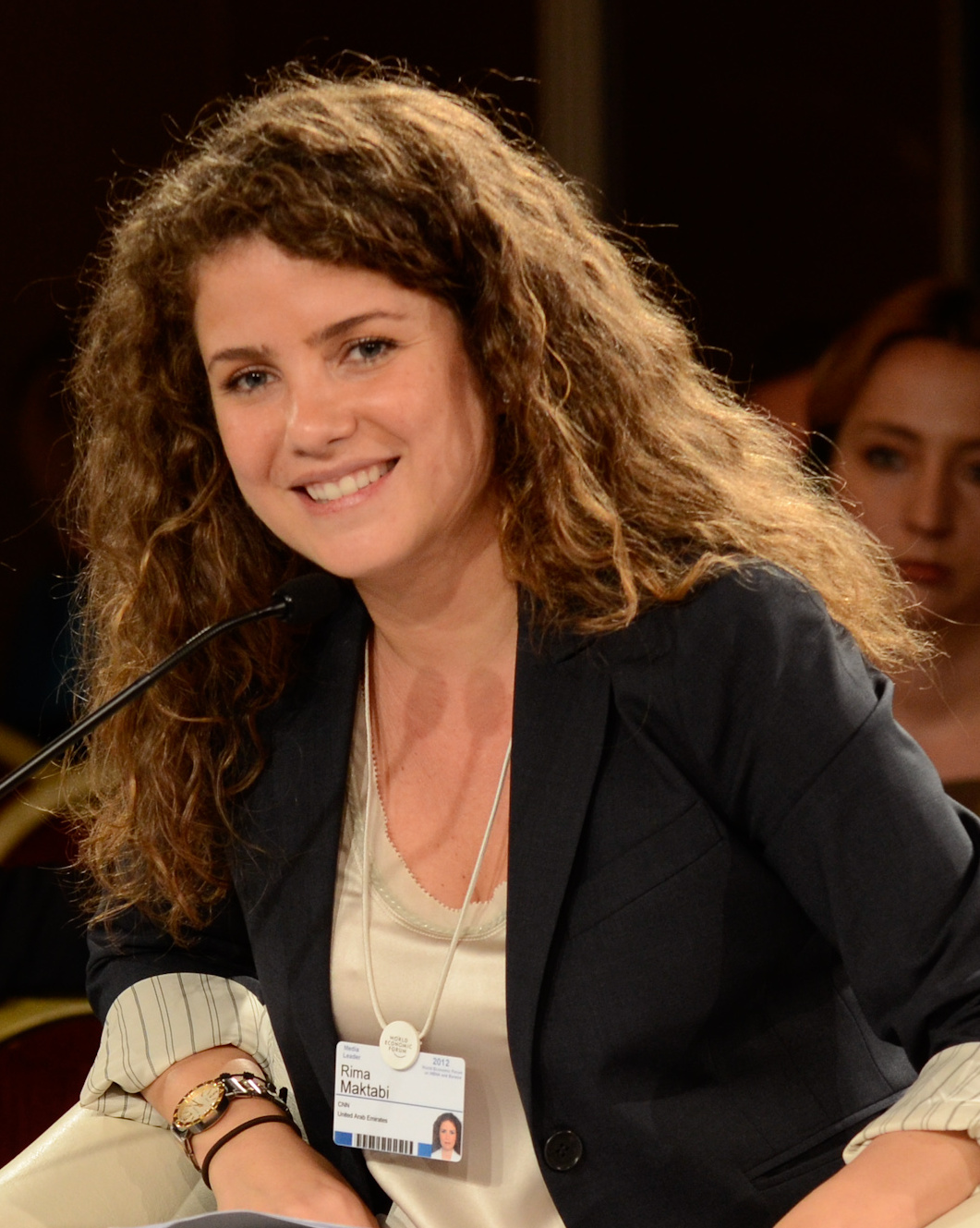
- Maktabi in 2012
- Born: July 4, 1977 (age 48); Beirut, Lebanon
- Education: BA degree in Communication Arts/ Masters in International Affairs
- Alma mater: Lebanese American University, Beirut
- Occupations: Television presenter and journalist
- Employer: Al-Arabiya
- Known for: Hosting CNN's Inside the Middle East
- Notable work: Reporting during the 2006 Lebanon War
- Spouse: Abdulrahman Al-Rashed (m. 2016)

Rima Maktabi (born 4 July 1977) (Arabic: ريما مكتبي) is a Lebanese TV presenter and award-winning journalist who returned to al-Arabiya after hosting CNN's monthly program Inside the Middle East for two years and previously working at the Arab satellite channel since 2005. She was among several female Arab journalists who first became known through her reporting during the 2006 Lebanon War and who had successful careers afterward, including Maktabi and her former colleague at al-Arabiya Najwa Qassem.

== Personal ==
Rima Maktabi was born 4 July 1977 in Beirut, Lebanon. She had grown up during the Lebanese Civil War, which lasted from 1975 to 1990. She graduated from the Lebanese American University in Beirut with a bachelor's degree in Communication Arts and a master's degree in International Affairs. She began her career in television at the age of 18 before her university education.

== Career ==
Rima Maktabi began her career in television with Lebanon's Future TV where she was a game show host and a weather presenter for 10 years. She presented prime-time news for al Arabiya from 2005 until July 2010. Her career changed course in 2006 when she covered the 2006 Lebanon War, also known as the July War or the Israel–Hezbollah War, which was a 34-day military conflict in Lebanon. She joined CNN 5 April 2010—which overlapped with the end of her time at al-Aribiya—as host for CNN's Inside the Middle East, where she covers Arab culture and news for CNN's international audience. Maktabi is currently based in the United Arab Emirates. She announced her return to al-Arabiya in October 2012.

== Notable reporting assignments ==
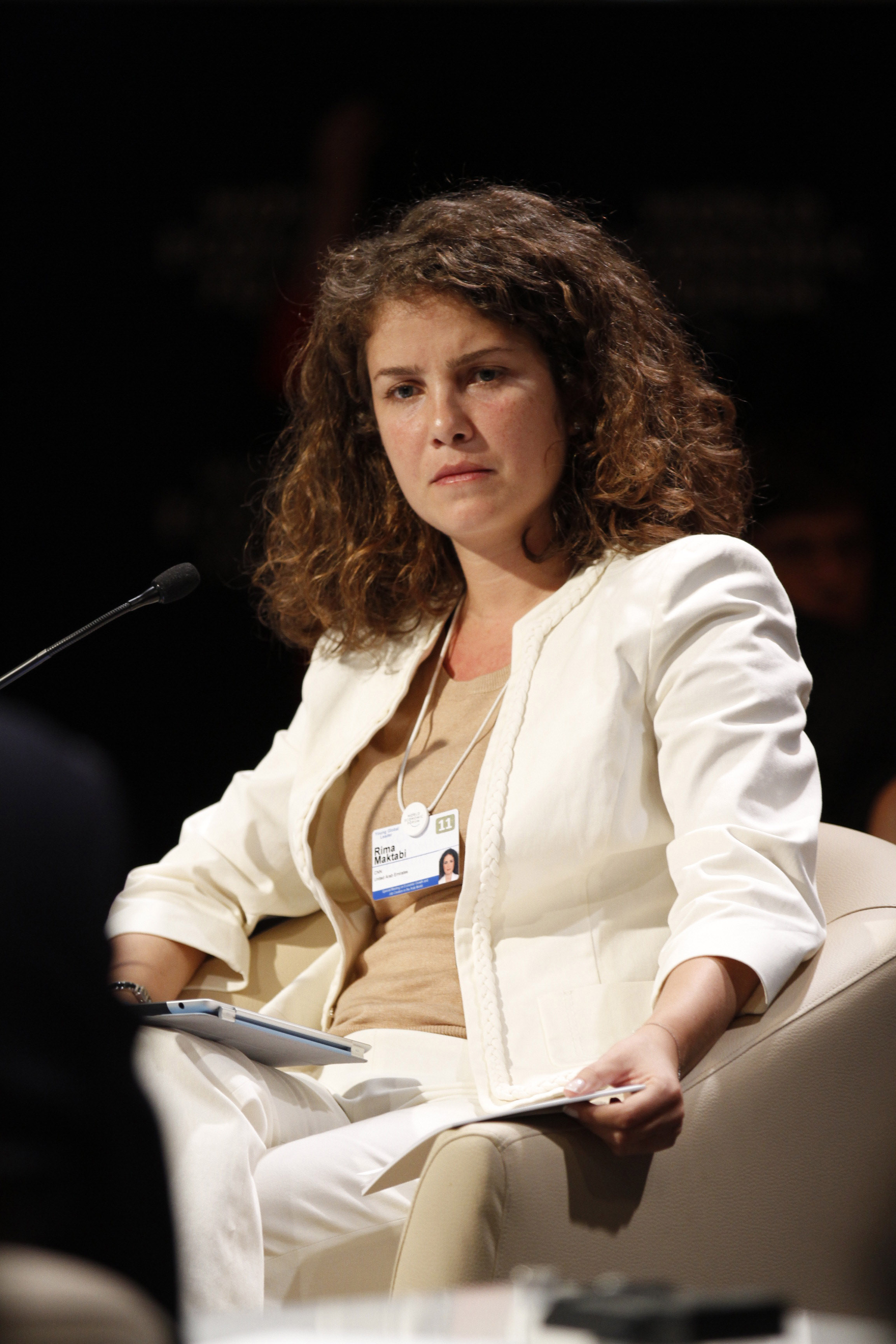
Rima Maktabi at the World Economic Forum's meeting on Economic Growth and Job Creation in the Arab World held in Jordan 2011.

=== 2006 Lebanon War ===
Rima Maktabi first became known internationally for her reporting in the 2006 Lebanon War. The 2006 Lebanon War lasted from July to September 2006. The Arab TV news channels, such as al-Arabiya, al-Jazeera, NTV, and LBC-TV, introduced female reporters in numbers to the war zone for the first time during this conflict. The journalists said they were not trained for war coverage prior to their assignment. At the time of the war, Maktabi was a "rookie" journalist but was able to get exclusive coverage for al-Arabiya.

Journalists during the conflict were often under fire. Maktabi said that Israelis targeted journalists and the International Red Cross requested the journalists to keep a distance from the relief workers when traveling in a convoy for the safety of the relief teams. Female Lebanese photojournalist Layal Nejib was killed by an Israeli rocket during the conflict. The conflict between Israel and Lebanon produced 1,191 Lebanese deaths along with thousands wounded or displaced. Maktabi told a TV crew interviewing her about her reporting experience, "We saw death close up".

Women had reported during previous wars, like print journalist Sanaa El Jack from Asharq Alawsat, but television channels were assigning women in larger numbers. Some female journalists were already reporting from Iraq. Women made up half of the staff at some news outlets like al Arabiya. In this war, female TV journalists were volunteering for the assignment.

== Al-Arabiya ==
Rima Maktabi was journalist and television presenter for al-Arabiya, an Arab satellite channel, for five years. Al-Arabiya announced her departure for CNN in mid-2010 with a two-month period when she would be working for CNN and presenting for al-Aribiya. While at al-Aribiya, Maktabi reported on significant events like elections in Iran and Lebanon, the conflict in Lebanon between the Lebanese Internal Security Forces and Fatah al-Islam militants at the Palestinian camp Nahr al-Bared in 2007, Arab League summits in Riyadh and Doha, the annual World Economic Forum in Davos, and the 2008 U.S. Presidential election.

In October 2012, al-Arabiya announced Maktabi would return after two years with CNN.

== CNN's Inside the Middle East ==
Rima Maktabi worked for CNN from April 2010 to October 2012. While at CNN, Maktabi was the host of the program Inside the Middle East and produced over 100 episodes. During this period, Maktabi covered notable events for CNN such as the beginning of the Arab Spring uprising in Tunisia, Egypt, and protests in Jordan and Bahrain. She covered the Syrian civil war from CNN offices in Atlanta, Georgia, Lebanon, and Abu Dhabi as foreign reporters were forbidden entry inside Syria.

== Awards ==
Rima has received awards for her coverage on the Israeli and Lebanese war in 2006. These were given to her from the Lebanese American University in Beirut and the Sheikh Mohamed Bin Rashed Foundation in Dubai.

== Personal life ==
Maktabi married Saudi Abdulrahman Al-Rashed in December 2016.

== See also ==
- Octavia Nasr
