= Najwa Qassem =

Lebanese journalist (1967–2020)

Najwa Kassem
- نجوى قاسم
- Born: 7 July 1967; Joun, Lebanon
- Died: 2 January 2020 (aged 52); Dubai, United Arab Emirates
- Resting place: Joun, Lebanon
- Education: Master's degree in Architecture (1993) from Lebanese University
- Occupations: Television presenter and journalist
- Employer: Al Arabiya
- Awards: Best Female Presenter, 2006, Arab Media Festival

== Personal ==
Najwa Qassem was born in a Shiite family on 7 July 1967 in Joun, Lebanon, a few years before the Lebanese Civil War. Qassem initially aspired to study architecture but soon fell in love with media and televised broadcasting.

== Career ==
She first appeared on television in 1991 on Al Jadeed (New TV Lebanon) as a program presenter, then in 1993 moved to Future TV of Beirut. In 2003 she became a part of the team for Al Arabiya. Since 2003 Qassem has been a senior anchor and correspondent of the Al Arabiya news channel. She has covered numerous wars and assassinations during her career including the assassination of Rafic Hariri in 2005, and was considered a veteran news reporter.

A year after joining the Al Arabiya team, she experienced and survived a bombing attack on the Al Arabiya's Baghdad news station. Eight people died in the bombing.

Najwa Qassem reported updates on the Iraqi war from the front lines in Baghdad. During her last week in Baghdad, the capital of Iraq, restrictions were placed on journalists making it dangerous to move around.

Najwa Qassem received extensive coverage during the Israeli war on Lebanon as she was one of a number of female Arab reporters who were reporting from the front lines. Qassem and her colleague Rima Maktabi observed the bombing of a heavily populated region of south Lebanon being attacked from the air as well as the sea.

== Awards ==
Najwa Qassem was awarded Best Female Presenter in 2006 at the Fourth Arab Media Festival.

== Death ==
On 2 January 2020, Qassem died in her sleep from a heart attack, although having had no prior health problems.

== See also ==
- Atwar Bahjat
