= Taleb Kanaan =

- Born: 4 January 1974 (age 52); Byblos, Lebanon
- Education: Lebanese University
- Occupations: News anchor Presenter
- Years active: 1997 – present
- Notable credit: Hewar Al-Arab

Taleb Kanaan (Arabic: طالب كنعان) is a Lebanese senior anchor for Al Arabiya and the presenter of the monthly program Hewar Al-Arab (Dialogue of the Arabs).

== Career ==
He started his career in National Broadcasting Network (Lebanon) NBN Lebanese news channel as an editor, following which he occupied other positions in this network. Currently he is a news anchor at Al Arabiya TV news channel.

== Education ==
He earned in 2002 an MA in political science from the Lebanese University. He hold a PhD from University Of Wales, UK.
