= Cyba Audi =

Communication strategist

Personal details
- Born: Cyba Adib Audi; 1965 (age 60–61) Beirut, Lebanon
- Education: American University of Beirut
- Occupation: Communication strategist

Cyba Audi (Arabic: صبا عودة, b. 1965 in Beirut, Lebanon) is a communication strategist and entrepreneur based in Dubai, United Arab Emirates (UAE). She presented 'Morning with Cyba' on Asharq News, a business morning show for business people in the Arab region.

She is the founder and managing director of Saba Consultants, which provides counsel in strategic communications planning, reputation building, and investor relations to clients in the Gulf Cooperation Council (G.C.C) countries. Previously, she was a senior presenter and producer at Al Arabiya News Channel, where she conceived and launched the channel's first business-news show, Al-Aswaq Al-Arabiya (Arabic: الاسواق العربية, meaning "Arab Markets"), in June 2005. Soon after its launch, the show became the highest-rated business program on Arab television. She anchored Al Arabiya's main business shows five days a week for five years.

Cyba Audi provides executive coaching to senior government officials and corporate managers. She is a much-solicited moderator at international forums and conferences, both locally and internationally. Audi is a feminist, who encourages Arab women to take an active role in business in the Middle East.

== Early life and education ==
Cyba Audi was born in 1965 in Beirut, Lebanon. Her passion for business administration began to develop during her high school years, as she used to assist her father with running their family business. Upon obtaining her Lebanese Baccalaureate from International College, Audi pursued a Bachelor of Business Administration (B.B.A.) at the American University of Beirut, from which she graduated in 1986.

== Career ==
=== Private banking ===
Soon after receiving her B.B.A, Audi moved to London, UK, where she worked as a trust specialist and account executive at Banque Française de Londres, a small private bank. She joined Merrill Lynch in 1998 as a relationship manager. As such, she managed and rebalanced the portfolio of individuals’ investments and acted as an expert in succession planning until 2003.

=== Business news production ===
Audi's strong background in finance caught the attention of the senior management of CNBC Arabiya. Audi moved to Dubai in May of that year to work as a Senior Anchor at the recently launched channel. For two years, she anchored the shows Kalam Al-Souq (Arabic: كلام السوق, meaning "What the Market Say"), which followed the regional stock markets during the day, and Jalsat Al-Aamal (Arabic: جلسة الأعمال, meaning "The Business Session"), which reviewed economic and business news of the day.

In 2005, Audi joined Al Arabiya News Channel, where she helped conceive and launch its business show Al-Aswaq Al-Arabiya (Arab Markets) in June of the same year. For five years, she anchored Al Arabiya’s main business shows five days a week, interviewing company executives, bankers, ministers, and central bank governors. Audi was known for her detailed analysis and her tough interviewing style, which earned her a leading position among Arab business television anchors. To cover live business events in the region, she traveled extensively throughout the GCC, particularly in Saudi Arabia. This enabled her to gain local insights on specific industries as well as financial and economic issues.

Audi regularly wrote an opinion column in the Arabic edition of Bloomberg Businessweek.

=== Private communication consulting ===
Throughout her career in television, Audi noticed that business leaders in the region often had trouble in communicating their company news in an effective way. In 2010, she established the media relations and financial service communications firm Saba Consultants, where she serves as its Head Storyteller and Managing Director. Saba Consultants counsels high-profile individuals, regional governments, and listed companies on building their reputation, communicating effectively with stakeholders, and positioning themselves. The firm also crafts corporate strategies, modern visuals, and digital campaigns for clients.

Audi also coaches chief executives and senior government officials on public image, public speaking, and facing the media.

=== Event moderation ===
Audi is an experienced moderator and presenter at local, regional, and international business events. These include webcasts, including 1,000 Voices for the Future by Empower Peace, conferences like Leaders in Dubai, and such forums as the World Economic Forum, the Global Competitiveness Forum, and Global Humanitarian Forum.
