= Sourp Nshan Cathedral, Beirut =

Sourp Nshan Cathedral
- Սուրբ Նշան եկեղեցի
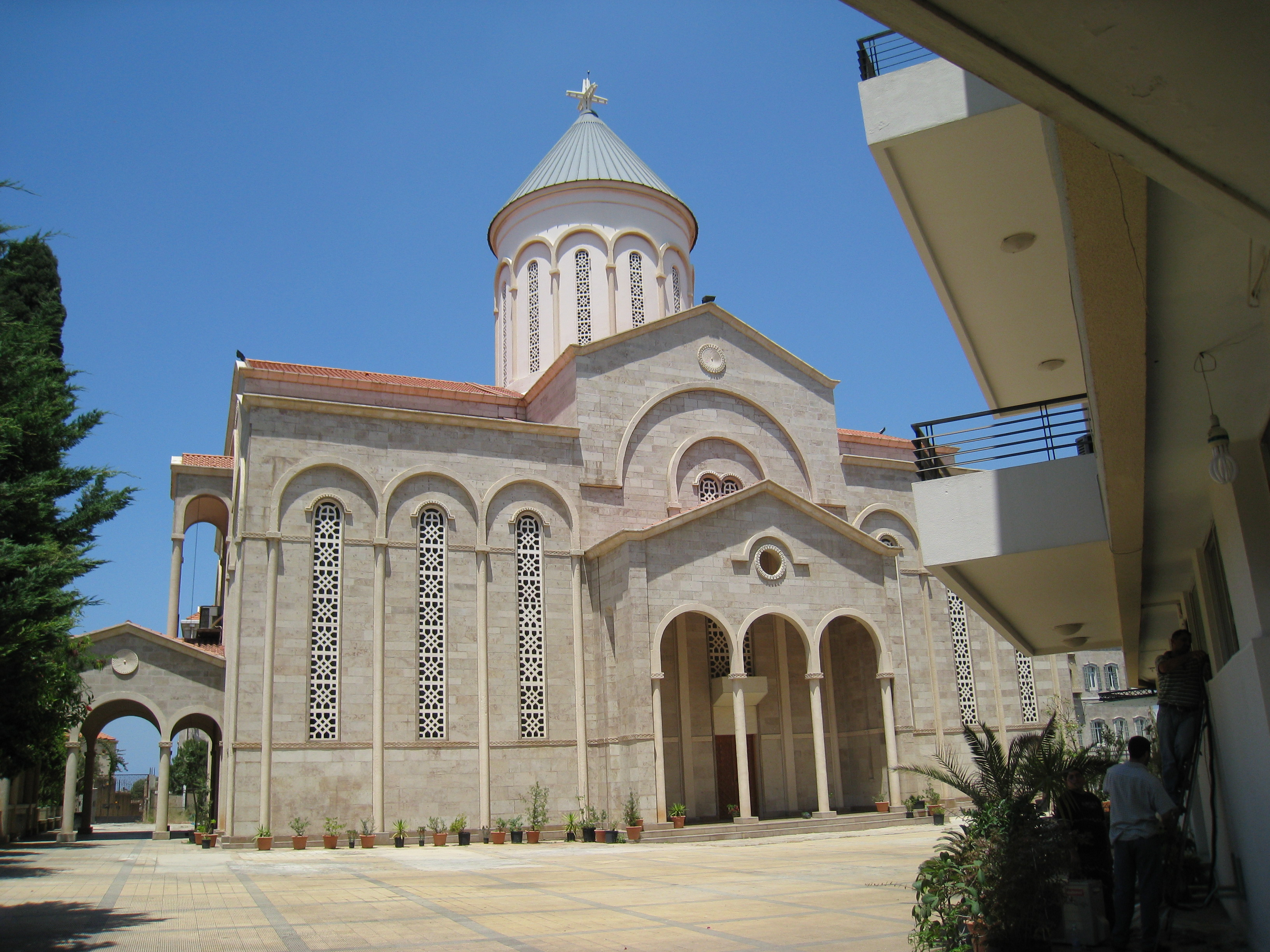
- Sourp Nshan on Serail Hill, downtown Beirut
- Sourp Nshan Cathedral
- 33.89518513897405°N 35.50041311379809°E
- Location: Beirut Central District, Beirut, Lebanon
- Denomination: Armenian Apostolic Church
- Tradition: Armenian Rite

History
- Consecrated: 1938

Architecture
- Architectural type: Cathedral
- Style: Armenian, with Art Déco elements
- Completed: 1938, restored 2004

Administration
- Province: Catholicosate of the Great House of Cilicia

Sourp Nshan Cathedral (Armenian: Սուրբ Նշան եկեղեց, romanized: Sourp Nshan yekeghets, lit. 'Church of the Holy Seal'; also rendered, Saint Nishan Church, Surb Nshan Cathedral) is an Armenian Apostolic cathedral situated in the Beirut Central District of Beirut, Lebanon. It stands on Serail Hill, directly adjacent to the Grand Sérail, the official seat of the Lebanese Prime Minister. The cathedral functions as the seat of the Armenian Apostolic Diocese of Lebanon within the ecclesiastical jurisdiction of the Catholicosate of the Great House of Cilicia, headquartered in Antelias, a suburb of Beirut. Its parish registers, which survive from 1863, constitute the oldest continuously kept sacramental records of any Armenian church in Lebanon.

== Name and dedication ==
The Armenian word nshan (Armenian: նշան) translates as "sign" or "seal," and the dedication Sourp Nshan, "Holy Sign", refers to the Cross as the pre-eminent sign of Christian faith. The name also occurs in other Armenian foundations, including a monastery of the same name which existed near Sivas in Anatolia until 1915, and a church bearing the title which stands in Tbilisi, Georgia. The Beirut church is sometimes called Saint Nichan in French and Saint Nishan in English usage, a Latinisation of the Armenian pronunciation.

== Location ==
The church stands on Serail Hill in the heart of the Beirut Central District. (Note: The Serail Hill is also known in literature as Qantari Hill.) The hill is dominated by two monumental Ottoman-era buildings, the Grand Sérail (seat of the Prime Minister) and the headquarters of the Council for Development and Reconstruction, together with the Hamidiyyeh clock tower. The Prelacy of Lebanon building, which houses the administrative offices of the Armenian Diocese, is situated immediately alongside the cathedral.

== History ==
=== Pre-genocide origins and Ottoman period ===
The contemporary Armenian presence in modern day Lebanon stretches across several centuries. Christian Armenians fleeing sectarian violence in Anatolia sought refuge in Mount Lebanon during the late seventeenth century, and as Beirut developed into a busy commercial harbour in the eighteenth century, Armenians continued to settle there as merchants and craftsmen.

Between 1823 and 1828, members of the Brotherhood of St. James of the Armenian Patriarchate of Jerusalem, Bishop Hakob Lyustratsi, Bishop Danios Kartaltsi, and Archimandrite Hakobos (also known as Grigor), settled in Beirut, then part of the Ottoman-subject Emirate of Mount Lebanon, alongside an evangelical community established by American missionaries. On 29 October 1845, Bishop Hakob died. Patriarch Hovhannes of Jerusalem purchased his property to serve as a pilgrims' station for Armenians travelling overland to Jerusalem, converting two rooms on the lower floor into a chapel. The majority of the expenses were borne by Deacon Hovsep Aintaptsi. Under the direction of Archimandrite Hovhannes Ipekjian, the Sourp Nshan hospice was subsequently renovated. After 1860, Deacon Hovsep Aintaptsi acquired the house of Yakob Lyustriatsi along with the adjoining properties. A church was built there shortly afterward. The church was administered by a priest delegated from the Armenian Patriarchate of Jerusalem. The earliest extant sacramental records of the parish date from 1863, documenting baptisms, marriages, and funerals among the local Armenian community. The frequency of sacramental entries in this early period indicates a modest community, though individual entries reveal families originating from towns across Anatolia, including Agn (Eğin) and Yozgat.

The local Armenian community grew modestly following the Hamidian massacres of 1894–97, which drove a wave of refugees to Lebanon. By the eve of the First World War, the local community numbered approximately 1,500 persons in Beirut alone, comprising carpet dealers, photographers, businessmen and agents of trading firms, who for the most part maintained a low profile under Ottoman surveillance.

=== Destruction during the First World War ===
During the First World War, the Ottoman authorities seized and demolished the Sourp Nshan Church under the stated pretext of road expansion, a measure that reflected the broader Ottoman policy of eliminating Armenian institutional presence across the empire during the years of the Armenian Genocide.

=== French Mandate and reconstruction (1920–1938) ===
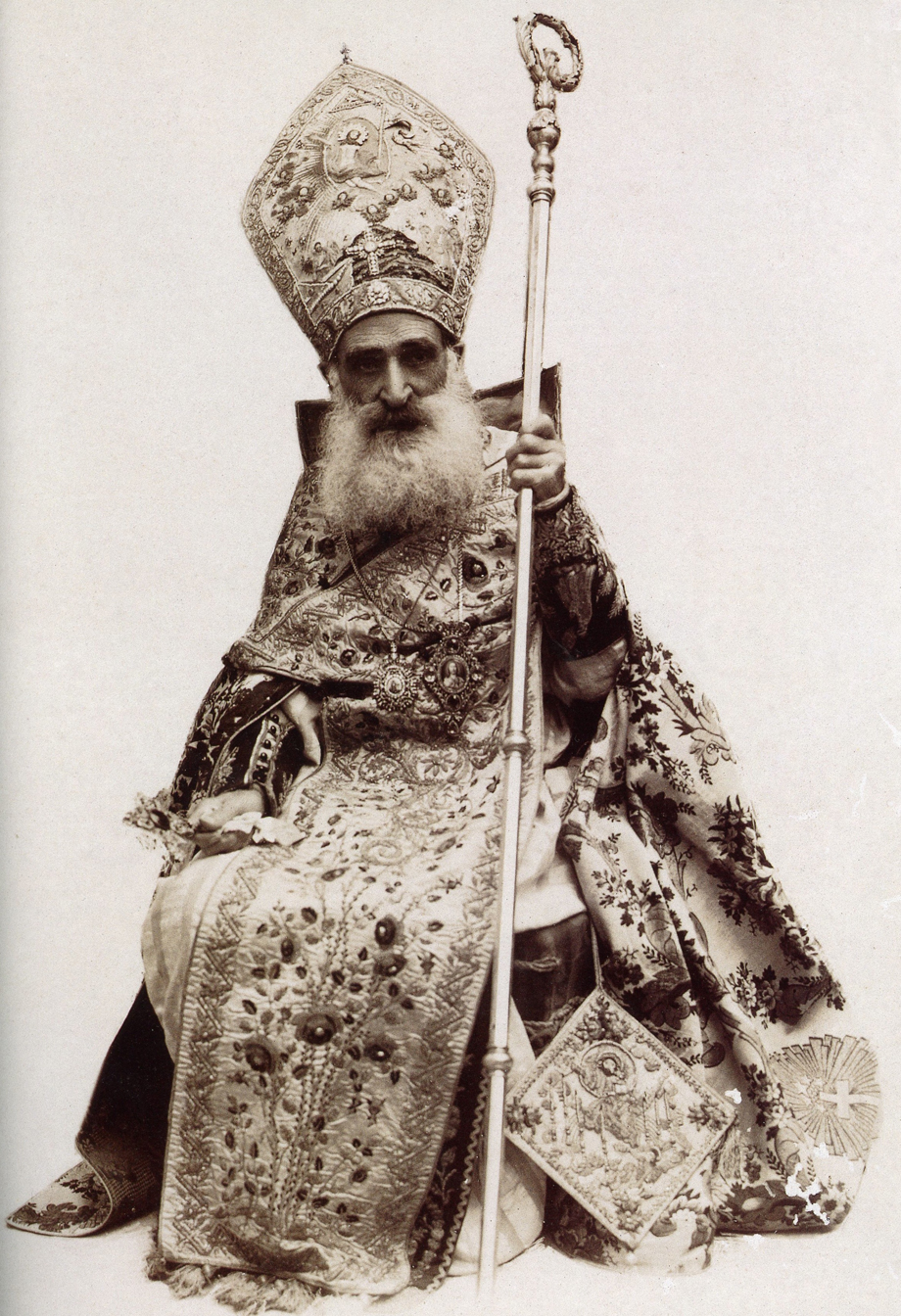
Catholicos Sahag II of Cilicia

After the First World War, the dissolution of the Ottoman Empire was a prelude to the establishment of Greater Lebanon under a French League of Nations Mandate. In the early 1920s, following France's abandonment of Cilicia and the resulting forced expulsion of Armenians, tens of thousands of genocide survivors disembarked at the port of Beirut and settled in refugee camps on the outskirts of the city, forming what would become the urban district of Bourj Hammoud. Under the leadership of Catholicos Sahag II Khabayan, who had himself fled the destruction of the Catholicosal see at Sis and had spent years travelling through the Middle East gathering orphans and survivors, approval to construct a new church was obtained from the French High Commissioner.

In 1924, the French High Commissioner formally recognised the Armenian Prelacy in Lebanon as part of the Holy See of Cilicia. The following year, Catholicos Sahag II appointed a Vicar-General to the prelacy and required the election of a Diocesan Executive Council. In 1929, Archbishop Tourian of the Armenian Patriarchate of Jerusalem, in reply to a letter from the Catholicos, formally transferred to the Holy See of Cilicia the churches, monasteries, and schools in Lebanon and Syria that had previously been under Jerusalem's jurisdiction, among them, the Beirut pilgrims' station that would become Sourp Nshan. In 1938, the old church building was replaced by the present structure. The reconstruction was financed by the Armenian community in Lebanon.

=== Prelacy building and mid-century development (1951–1963) ===
In 1951, Bishop Khoren Paroyan was elected as the first formally titled Prelate of the Armenian Prelacy of Lebanon; before that date the Catholicosate had been represented in Lebanon by Pontifical Vicars and Locum Tenentes. The election marked the institutional maturation of the Armenian community in Lebanon, which by the 1950s was operating an extensive network of schools, churches, cultural organisations, and community centres in Beirut and across the country. In 1963, a newly constructed Prelacy administrative building was inaugurated immediately adjacent to Sourp Nshan.

=== Lebanese Civil War (1975–1990) and Solidere reconstruction ===
The Lebanese Civil War (1975–1990) inflicted severe damage on the Beirut Central District. Sourp Nshan, situated on Serail Hill, was among the religious buildings that suffered damage during the prolonged conflict. Following the end of the civil war, the Lebanese government enacted Law 117 of 1991, creating the legal framework for the establishment of Solidere, the Société Libanaise pour le Développement et la Reconstruction du Centre-Ville de Beyrouth, as a private joint-stock company charged with the comprehensive reconstruction of the Beirut Central District. Solidere's Master Plan, completed and approved by decree of the Council of Ministers in 1994, identified 291 buildings to be preserved and restored. Religious buildings in the downtown area were entrusted to their respective communities for restoration. Sourp Nshan was restored in 2004, returning the cathedral to its pre-war appearance.

== Architecture ==
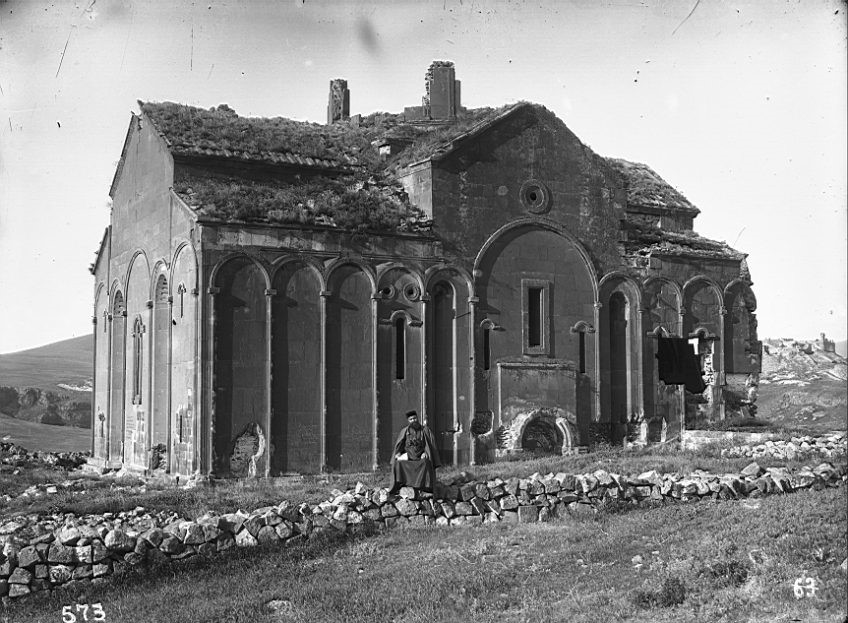
Cathedral of Ani in 1905

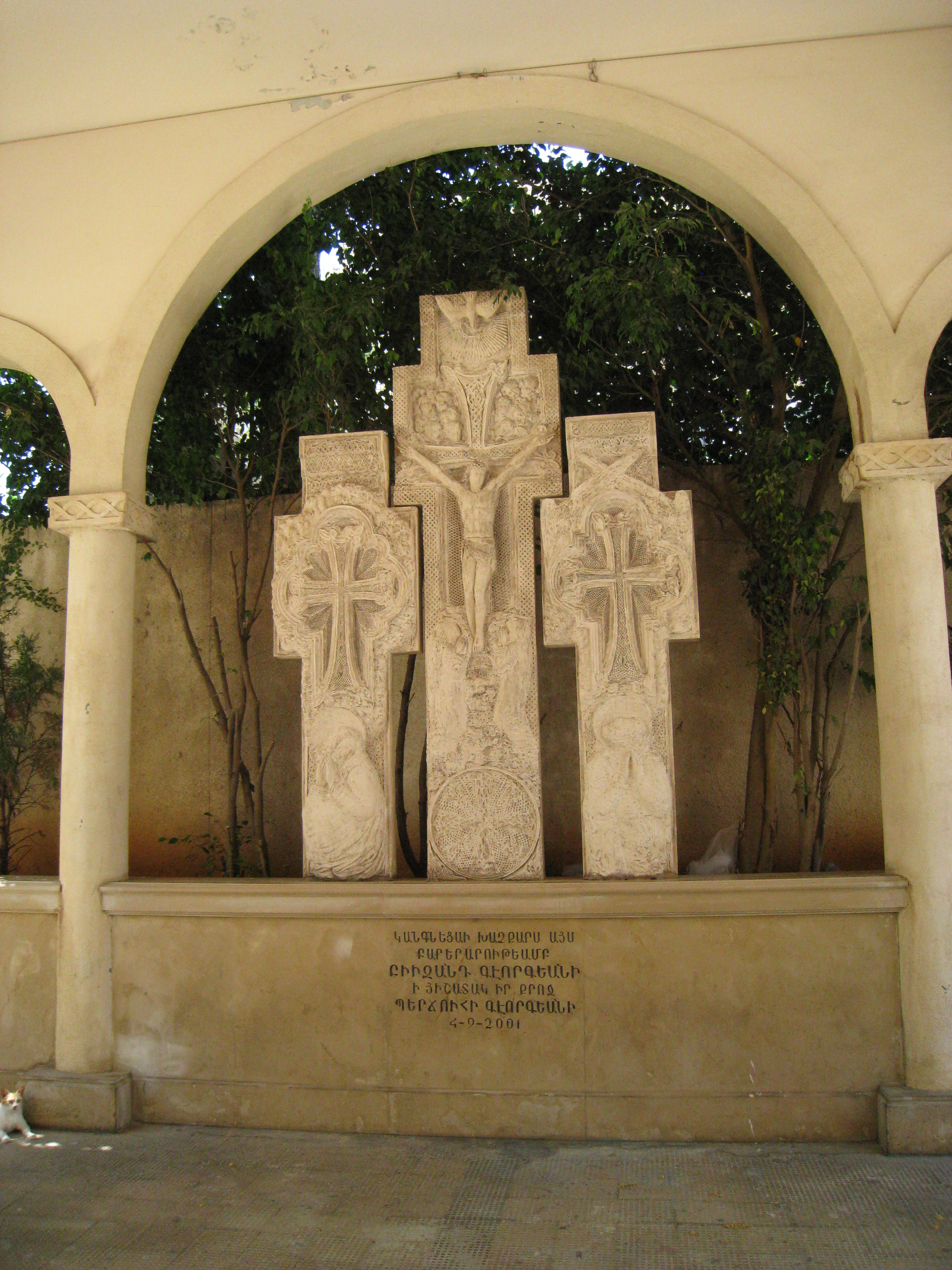
Khachkar on the church grounds in Beirut

The present structure, erected in 1938, was designed by Dikran Khoubesserian, a young architect who had recently graduated from the École spéciale des travaux publics du bâtiment et de l'industrie in Paris in 1933. The Cathedral of Ani was selected as the explicit architectural model, a choice imposed by the Catholicosate itself, as recorded in the minutes of a meeting attended by the Catholicos, the Beirut prelate, the construction committee, and the cathedral's ladies' committee. The resulting building shares several features with its Ani prototype. The facades are articulated by a series of blind arcades in low relief. The plan of the church is basilical, surmounted by a dome rising at the crossing of two perpendicular barrel vaults, resting on a circular drum carried by pendentives springing from four cruciform piers. Rustom and Tachjian further note that the barrel vaults were subsequently covered by pitched roofs to reinforce the visual resemblance to the Ani model, an intervention characteristic of a broader post-1940s tendency to "Armenianize" churches that had been built on a basilical plan during the 1930s. The building is set within a compact garden enclosed by a low wall, on a commanding position atop Serail Hill. A khachkar (Armenian: խաչքար, "cross-stone"), a carved stele bearing a cross, characteristic of Armenian Christian tradition, known as the Amenaprgich ("All-Saviour") khachkar, stands in the grounds of the church.

== Parish records ==
The parish registers of Sourp Nshan rank among the most significant sources for Armenian genealogical and demographic history outside Armenia, with sacramental records surviving from 1863. These registers were utilised in epidemiological and demographic studies of the Armenian diaspora conducted by the Lebanese-Armenian physician Haroutune K. Armenian in the 1980s and 1990s. In addition to continuous sacramental entries, which extend to approximately 1980, the collection includes three censuses of the parish community, conducted in 1949, 1970, and 1980.

== Ecclesiastical jurisdiction ==
Sourp Nshan serves as the cathedral church of the Armenian Apostolic Prelacy of Lebanon, which is one of the dioceses under the jurisdiction of the Catholicosate of the Great House of Cilicia seated in Antelias. The Catholicosate of Cilicia is one of the four hierarchical sees of the Armenian Apostolic Church; its jurisdiction, which does not derive from any fixed place of residence, encompasses Armenian Apostolic communities across the Middle East, Europe, and the Americas.

== See also ==
- Armenian Apostolic Church – National church of Armenia
- Armenians in Lebanon – Ethnic group in Lebanon
- Beirut Central District
- Armenian Apostolic Diocese of Lebanon
- Serail Hill – Hill in Beirut
