= Vartine Ohanian =

Lebanese politician of Armenian descent

Vartine Ohanian (Arabic: فارتينيه أوهانيان, Armenian: Վարդինե Օհանյան; born 1 January 1984 in Burj Hammoud, Matn District) is a Lebanese politician of Armenian descent who served as the Lebanese Minister of Youth and Sports from 2020 to 2021.

== Education and early life ==
Vartine received her secondary education at the Yeghishe Manoogian and the Levon and Sophia Hagopian college, both Armenian schools. She later obtained an MBA at the Institute of Social Sciences of the University of Lebanon a masters degree in social psychology from the same university. She later studied project management at the Haigazian University.

== Professional career ==
Varti Ohanian worked as a social worker for the Armenian Orphanage of Byblos from 2006 until 2008, and at the same time for the Armenian diocese in Lebanon from 2007 until 2008. From 2013 to 2017, she was a social counselor and administrative coordinator within the union of social workers of the Armenian community in Lebanon. In January 2020 she became a Minister for Youth and Sports in the Government of Hassan Diab after her nomination by the Dashnak Party She was one of the six female ministers in the Diab Government which included twenty ministries, which was viewed as a step in the right direction towards gender equality in Lebanese politics. She was the youngest minister in the cabinet and it was the first time an Armenian woman became a Minister in Lebanon. After Hassan Diab's Government resigned on the 10 of August 2020, she will have the function of a caretaker of the Ministry until a replacing Government is constituted.
