= Theatre of Lebanon =

Theatre in Lebanon has its origin in passion plays. The musical plays of Maroun Naccache from the mid-1800s are considered the birth of modern Arab theatre. Some scholars, such as Abdulatif Shararah, have divided Lebanese theatre into three historical phases centered on 1) translations of European plays, 2) Arab nationalism, and 3) realism.

== Passion Plays ==
The dramatic presentation of the Passion of Jesus Christ was a traditional practice during Lent among the Christian communities in Lebanon. Additionally, passion plays, depicting the events of Karbala, were also common among the Shia of Lebanon. Passion plays, whether Christian or Shia, were events centered around village life. In villages, it was not uncommon for Christians to participate in minor roles in Shia passion plays and vice versa.

== 1800s ==
The first theatrical production, which was by Maroun Naccache, was performed in Beirut in 1846. On a visit to Italy in late 1846, Maroun Naccache was exposed to theatre and upon his return to Lebanon, he wrote an Arabic adaptation of L'Avare (Al Bakhil). The increase of theatrical productions is evident in advertisements for plays and critical reviews that appeared in the publication of the arts magazine, Thamrat Al Funun, starting in 1875.

== 1900s ==
The Naccache plays paved the road. By the turn of the century, theatre became a "customary form of entertainment," overcoming the initial objection of the Church regarding dramatic arts. As part of the end of the academic year, universities in Beirut staged theatrical productions. In 1903, Julius Caesar was staged at the American University of Beirut followed by Hamlet in 1905.

== 1910s ==
The contributions of expatriate literary figures such as, Mikhael Naimy of the New York Pen League who wrote the play, Fathers and Sons in 1906, were an important factor in the acceptance of the literary genre in Lebanon.

== 1920s ==
The Grand Théâtre, built in 1927 on Rue Amir Bachir in Beirut Central District, catered to the Francophone communities of Lebanon.

== 1940s ==
Said Akl's Cadmus that was published in 1944 was considered another important contribution to the development of theatre in Lebanon due to its nationalistic theme.

== 1950s ==
One of the most important playwrights of the 1950s was Said Takieddine whose one-act play, The Outcast (1953), was acclaimed. This period also witnessed the flourishing of the Armenian Lebanese theatre that was heralded by Kaspar Ipekian and later George Sarkissian.

== 1960s ==
Due to the fact that Beirut was the only city in the Arab world that enjoyed "true freedom of expression," theatrical productions flourished in Lebanon in the 1960s. The National Theatre was founded in 1960, paving the way for the emergence of a number of theatrical troops, including the Rahbani brothers and their star, Fairuz. Le Théâtre de Dix-Heures, focusing on comedy, was established in 1962 by Gaston Chikhani, Pierre Gédéon, Abdallah Nabbout and Edmond Hanania. One of the most important plays of the decade was Issam Mahfouz's Zinzalakht, which was written in the Lebanese vernacular. Mahfouz is credited for sparking the creative elements of many playwrights and actors, such as Raymound Gebara, Jalal Khoury, Nidal Achkar, and Antoine Courbage.

By the mid sixties, the Rahbani theatre had become very extravagant. It was reported that in order to stage the musical, Fakhr al-Din (1966), 200 performers, 30 dancers and a 30-piece orchestra were hired while the costumes alone cost 50,000 L.L.

== 1970s ==
By the early seventies, at least five theatrical companies had gained mass appeal in Lebanon. Roger Assaf, Nidal Achkar, and Antoine and Latifa Multaka were experimenting with avant garde theatre in the early 1970s. The internationally renowned Caracalla Dance Theatre was founded in 1970. Romeo Lahoud produced a series of musicals starring, Salwa Al Katrib, such as Singof Singof in 1974 and Bint El Jabal in 1977. The Rahbani brothers also continued staging musicals, like Ya'ish Ya' ish (1970) and Sahh al-Nawm (1971), especially at the Piccadilly Theater on Hamra Street.

== 1980s ==
Despite the war, theatrical productions continued albeit moving from Beirut to safer locations in the northern suburbs and the coastal city of Jounieh. A series of plays that centered around the folkloric character, the fool of Chanay, were produced by Nabih Abou Al Hosen and staged at the theatre of Casino du Liban. Also, Romeo Lahoud continued to produce musicals with Salwa Al Katrib and so did the Rahbani brothers who introduced new singers to the public, the sisters Ronza and Fadia Tomb.

== Present ==
The majority of theatres in Lebanese are based in the capital The sons of Mansour Rahbani continued in the tradition of their father and have produced several musicals that were staged in Baalbeck, Byblos and overseas.

Nidal Al Achkar established Al Madina Theater Association for Arts and Culture in 2005, renovating the Saroulla Cinema, which was built in the late sixties on Hamra Street, and turning it into a multidisciplinary platform. Al Achkar's renovation of Saroulla created hope among artists that other theaters on Hamra Street, such as Piccadilly Theatre, would also be restored to their former glory. Al Madina Theatre was credited for bringing back traces of high culture to Hamra Street that was the cultural hub of Beirut before the war. In 2011, The Maqamat Dance Theater also opened on Hamra Street in 2011, providing a new contemporary dance space and furthering Hamra's cultural and art-scene revival.

The 20th anniversary was celebrated in Al Madina Theatre in 2016.

The first Lebanese National Theatre Festival in 2018 was also held there by the Ministry of Culture in Al Madina Theatre.

Provocative playwright Rabih Mroué wrote How Nancy Hoped it Was All an April Fool's Joke in 2007. The play dealt with political problems and addressed the issues that divide the country.

In 2008, Zeina Daccache, a television comedian and head of The Lebanese Centre for Drama Therapy, presented 12 Angry Lebanese that starred prisoners from the infamous, maximum-security Roumieh Prison. Daccache and a group of prisoners adapted the play from Reginald Rose's Twelve Angry Men and then staged it at the prison in a makeshift theatre. Socialites, the Prosecutor General and the Minister of Interior were among the guests and other prisoners present at the premier.

Théâtre de Beyrouth, a vestige of pre-war Beirut, was a small theatre known for its cutting-edge productions and performances in various languages, Arabic, French, and English. Another active theatre, with more than 60 performances per year, is Monot Theater, presenting local French-language programming but also international acts, such as the Danish, Svalholm Dans' "Imago Poetry and Performing Arts" in 2011.

Lebanese dancer-choreographer Georgette Gebara was conferred with the new honorary membership of the International Theatre Institute at the 33rd ITI World Congress that was held in China in 2011.
