= Kasbar =

Kasbar is an Armenian given name. Notable people with the name include:

- Kasbar Ipegian, Lebanese Armenian and one of the most important figures of Armenian theater
- Kasbar Sinabian (1862–1933), prominent military doctor and minister of the Ottoman Empire
