= Mario Bassil =

Lebanese actor, comedian, TV presenter, producer and director

Mario Bassil (Arabic: ماريو باسيل) (born 12 January 1966) is a Lebanese comic actor, stand-up comedian, TV presenter, producer and director, best known for his controversial character Marioca and his daring work in the Comedy Night theatrical series since 2003, that showed nightly in Beirut, which he directed, produced and took part in, that approaches social and political topics of the duration of an hour.

He featured for five years in the TV comedy series Mouniaa Fi Loubnan (منع في لبنان).

Mario is well known throughout the Arab world. He was awarded Best Comic Actor for 2009 at the Lebanese annual Murex D'or Awards.

== Biography ==
=== Early life ===
He studied agricultural engineering and then changed his specialization to computer science and he did not like the specialization. He studied the communication at the Lebanese American University and then continued his studies and majored in cinema in France in 2006, where he gained the theatrical experience, as he worked in more than 30 plays for major authors from Shakespeare to Beckett to Eugène Ionesco. After his return from Paris, he established a troupe with his friend Marc Kodeih and presented his first work titled: TV or Not TV. Then he separated from Marc afterwards, after the play's success and founded a band alone and was the first play titled Mercy Ktir and has been a success and was followed by the play Dar El Founoun which failed miserably, so he moved to the "chansonnier" theater style from the classical theater which he learned and experienced at the university.

=== Family ===
In October 2018, he civil-married Russian lawyer named Alexandra Chistyakova in Cyprus. In March 2019 he had his first child, Sofia. In 2020, he went to Moscow, the capital of Russia, to spend the quarantine period there, publishing a video clip from a park with his wife and one-year-old daughter.

=== Career ===
His start was in the field of advertisements and theatrical and television shows. He played comedic roles for years in the television program Mouniaa Fi Loubnan (منع في لبنان) on LBC and presented works in the world of comedy theater with a critical nature, where he dealt in most of his plays with the political and social reality. In 2019, he participated in the Celebrity Duet (ديو المشاهير) program to support a charity.

== His works ==
=== Television ===
- 1998-2006: Mouni'a Fi Loubnan (Program)
- 2002: Mamnou'a (program)
- 2008-2009: Jack Hunter and the Lost Treasure of Ugarit
- 2014: El Layleh Jnoun (program)
- 2018: Seiko (series)

=== Theater ===
- Comedy Night
- Bala Din
- Merci Ktir
- Dar El Founoun
- 'iem el Jem'a
- Mhajer Prospen
- 2016-2017: On The Road
- 2016: One Angry Man
- 2019: Rola and Mario

=== In the cinema ===
- 2012: Yalla Aaqbalakon
- 2013: Heritages (Documentary)
- 2015: The Story of Seconds

=== Singing ===
- 2010: Khales Khales
- 2010: Batikha

== Awards ==
- Murex d'Or award for Best Comedian in 2009.

== See also ==
- Pierre Chamassian
- Sami Khayat
