= Hask =

Hask or HASK may refer to:

- HAŠK, Hrvatski akademski športski klub, Croatian football club
- Hask (periodical), official publication of the Armenian Catholicosate of the Great House of Cilicia (Holy See of Cilicia)
- Hayastani Azgayin Scautakan Sharjum Kazmakerputiun, the Armenian Scout movement
- Hask, the mathematical category of Haskell programming language types and extensionally identified Haskell functions as morphisms
