= Shamlian =

Shamlian is an Armenian surname. Notable individuals with this surname include:

- Janet Shamlian (born 1962), American television reporter of Armenian origin
- Souren Shamlian (1899–1951), Armenian Turkish journalist, founder and publisher of the Armenian newspaper Marmara

== See also ==
- Armenian Evangelical Shamlian Tatigian Secondary School, Armenian school, in Bourdj Hamoud, Lebanon
