= Sami Khayat =

Lebanese comic actor, director and writer (1943–2023)

- Born: سامي ألبير خيَّاط; 2 December 1943
- Died: 26 April 2023 (aged 79)
- Awards: Ordre des Arts et des Lettres (2020)

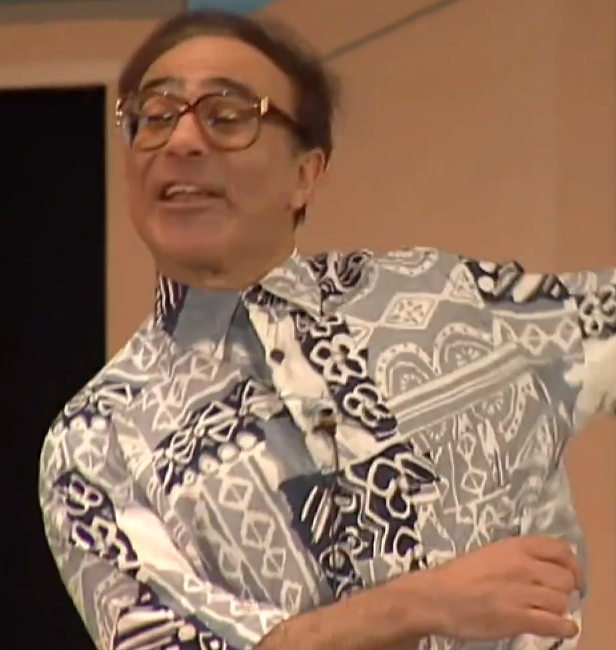

Sami Khayat (Arabic: سامي خياط; 5 December 1943 – 26 April 2023) was a Lebanese francophone theatre comic actor, director, and writer. He is considered one of the pioneers of comic theatre in Lebanon.

== Biography ==
Khayat was born on 5 December 1943. He began his artistic career with a play he presented in 1960, entitled Molière Hugo and Sofocole. His plays were classified as satirical lyric theater, known as the chansonnier. He duetted with Pierre Chamassian from 1973 until 1986, and once again in 2013.

In 2020, he was awarded the French Medal of Arts and Literature with the rank of officer, in recognition of his 60 years of theatrical work in the French and Franco-Lebanese languages. which did not stop even in the midst of the Civil war. He was honored on several occasions in Lebanon by The Gebran Tueni Foundation and Fakhruddin Foundation.

Sami Khayat died of bone cancer on 26 April 2023, at the age of 79.

== Work ==
His works include:

- Super-Choir (1978)
- Yes for Elias يس فور لياس
- Abu Clips أبو كليبس (1980)
- Baabda Boom بعبدا بوم (1981)
- Finito (1982-1983)
- Star Epidemi ستار إيبيديميو, in Kulturzentrum (Jounieh) (2007)
- Mine Dir Rien مين دريان
- Kuma Sava كوما سافا
- Taisez Vous - 2
- Karafe قرف

== See also ==
- Pierre Chamasian
- Théâtre de Dix-Heures
- Mario Bassil
