= Pagramian SC =

Former Lebanese association football club

Pagramian
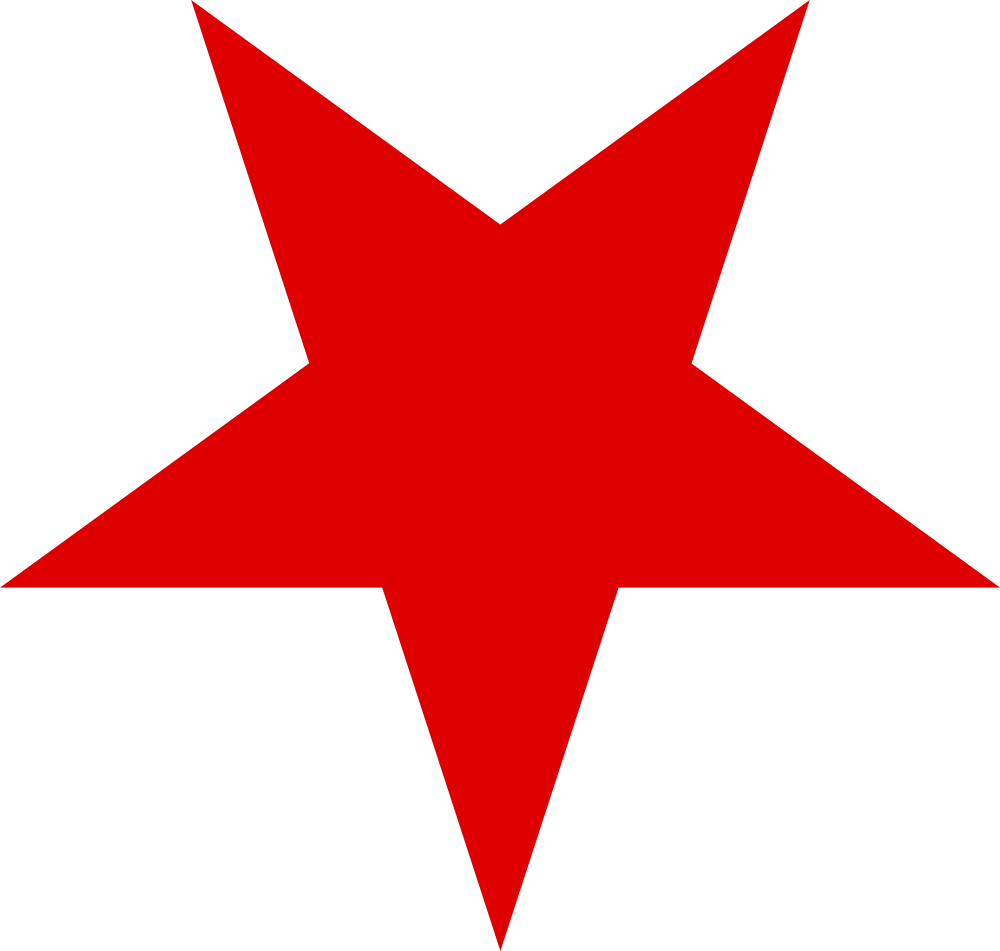
- Full name: Pagramian Sports Club
- Founded: October 1944
- Dissolved: 1960; 65 years ago

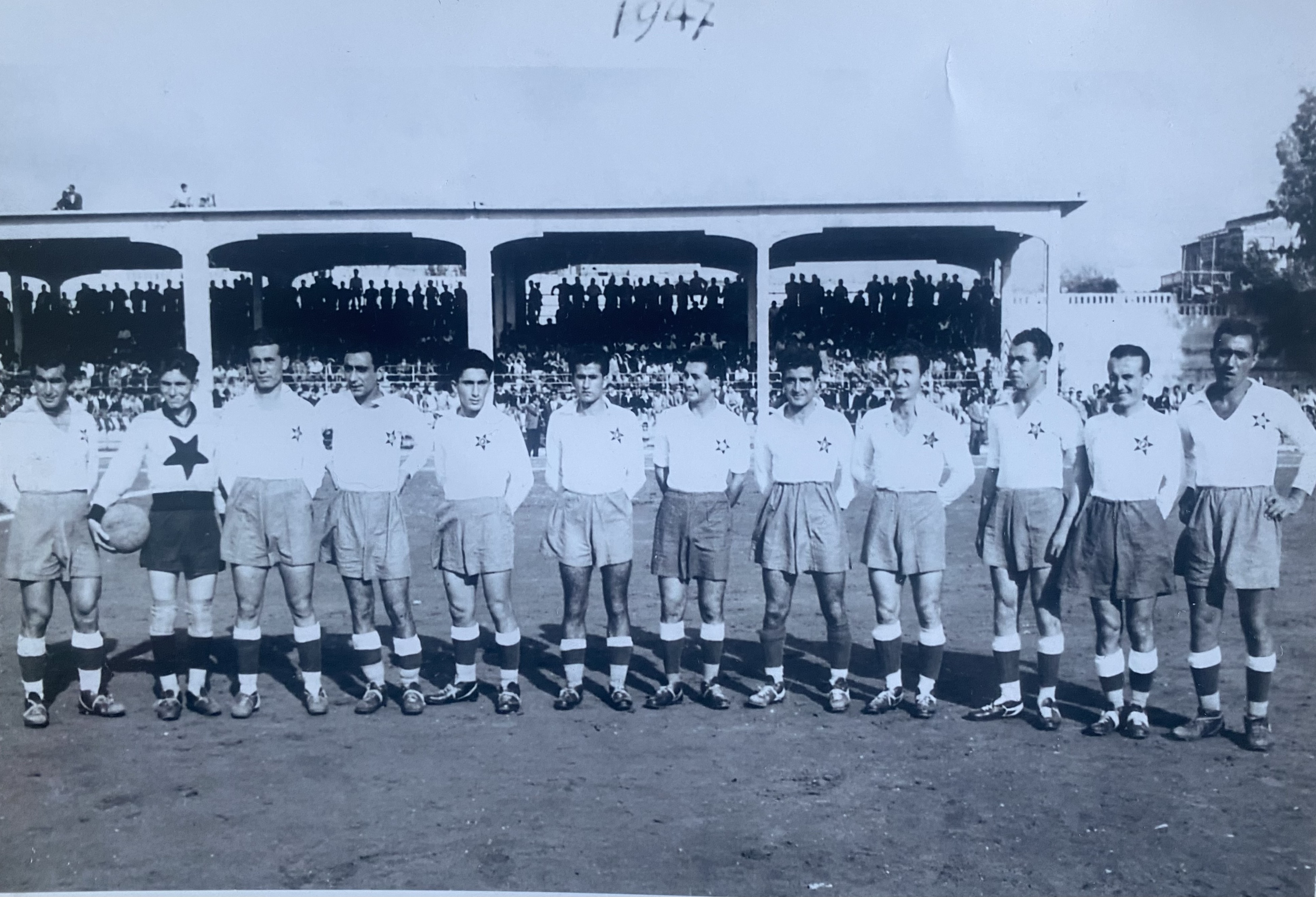
Beirut Municipal Stadium, 1947

Pagramian Sports Club (Arabic: نادي باغراميان الرياضي; Western Armenian: Բագրամեան մարզական միութիւն; Armenian: Բաղրամյան մարզական միություն) was a Lebanese-Armenian sports and cultural organisation linked to the Lebanese Communist Party.

Named after the military commander the Soviet Marshal Ivan Bagramyan, it was formed in the 1944. The club was shut down by the Lebanese government during the presidency of Fouad Chehab in 1960. In 1969, Ararad SA was formed as a continuation of Pagramian.

== History ==
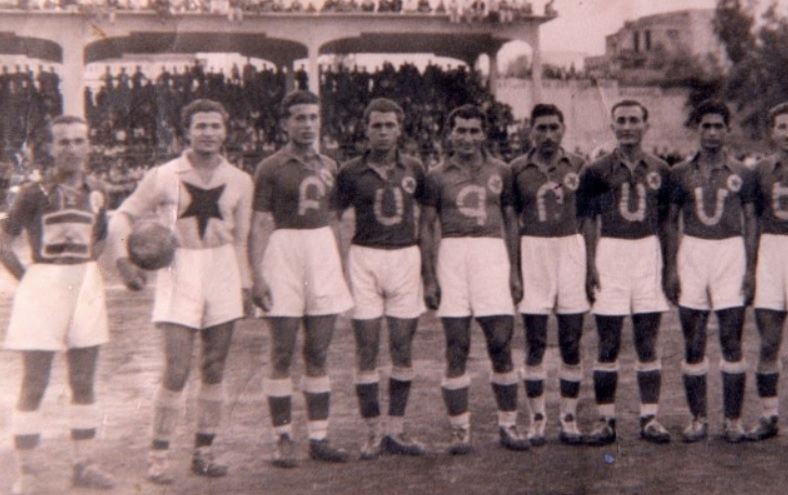
Pagramian football team

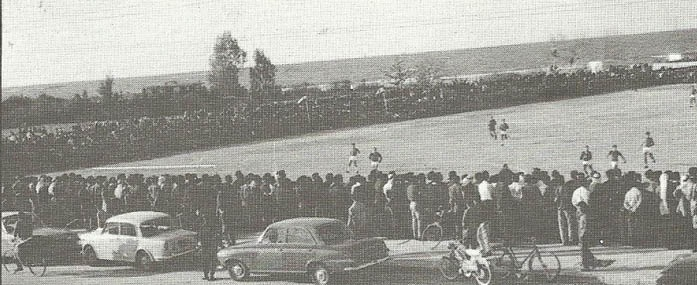
Match between Pagramian and Tadamon Sour football teams in 1956, held in El-Buss, Tyre. Tadamon won 3–1.

Pagramian was founded at the beginning of October 1944 by Homenetmen players who decided form a new club. Other football players from Antranik and Homenmen also joined. They were affiliated to the Lebanese Football Association (LFA) from the 1945–46 season. Pagramian won the Municipal Cup, organised by the LFA, in their debut season. In 1946–47 they won the Lebanese Second Division. Pagramian were finalists of the 1947 Lebanese FA Cup, losing 2–1 to Nahda. In 1949 Pagramian took part in the Beirut Committee of football clubs.

Ahead of the 1957 parliamentary election, Pagramian Sports Club and other anti-Tashnag (anti-ARF) Lebanese Armenian sports associations like Homenmen (affiliated with the Hunchaks), Antranik (affiliated with the Ramgavars), Veradznunt, and Tekeyan-Baykar organized a "Pan-Armenian Festival" on 22 April 1957, under the patronage of Archbishop Khat Atchabahian. Around 2,000 athletes took part in the event, which had around 25,000 spectators at the Beirut Municipal Stadium.

On 10 June 1957, the day of the election, three people (Krikor Vrtanessian, Bedros Kdjoyan and Levon Kdjoyan) were shot dead in front of the Pagramian club offices. The club blamed the Tashnag party for the killings.

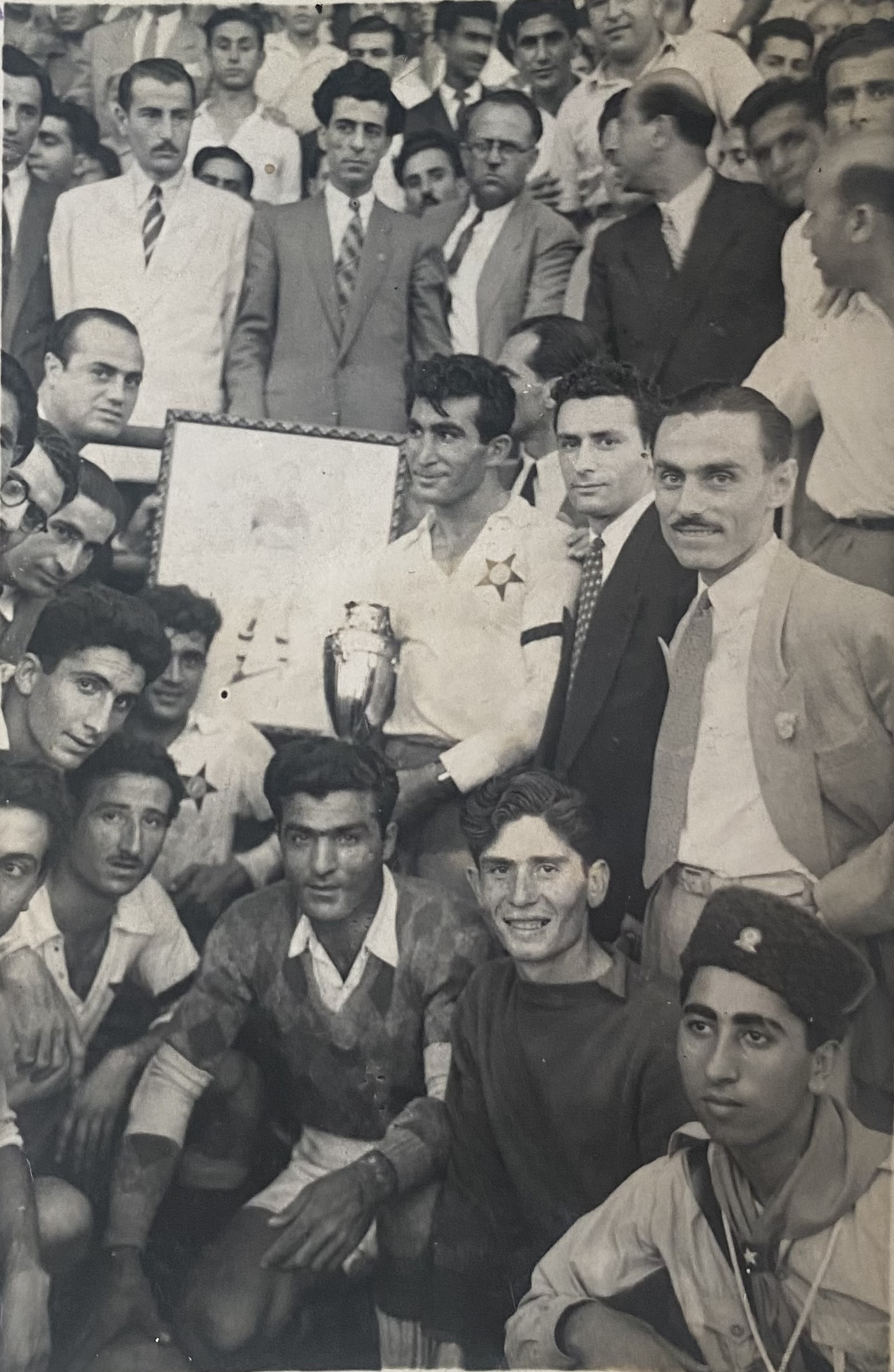
Pagramian team with Lebanese Second Division cup (winning season 1946–1947)

The Pagramian Sports Club was shut down by the Lebanese government in 1960. In 1969 the Ararad Sports Association was set up to fill the void after the dissolution of Pagramian.

== Honours ==
- Lebanese FA Cup
  - Runners-up (1): 1946–47
