= Haratch (weekly) =

Armenian language newspaper in Lebanon

- Type: Weekly
- Founded: January 1957
- Ceased publication: 1970
- Political alignment: Communist
- Language: Armenian
- Headquarters: Beirut

Haratch ('Forward') was an Armenian language weekly newspaper published in Beirut, Lebanon from 1957 to 1970. Founded in January 1957, it was an organ of the Lebanese Communist Party. It stopped publication in 1970.

In 1971 the Communist Party began publishing a new Armenian language weekly, Gantch.
