= Papken Papazian =

Lebanese Armenian writer

Papken Papazian is a Lebanese Armenian writer and one of the leaders of the Armenian Revolutionary Federation (ARF). He visited the United States in 1960 to tour the country on behalf of the ARF; during his visit he spoke at the Armenian Community Center in Syracuse, New York on the 42nd anniversary of the Armenian Independence Day. He wrote the play My baby which was performed by Kasbar Ipegian's Hamazkayin Theater Association in Beirut in 1943.
