= Joghovourti Tsayn =

Joghovourti Tsayn (Armenian: Ժողովուրդի Ձայն, meaning "Voice of the People") was an Armenian weekly newspaper, issued as an organ of the Syrian–Lebanese Communist Party. The first issue appeared on February 6, 1938 in Beirut, Lebanon. It was the first Armenian-language organ of the party. Artin (Haroutiun) Madoyan was the editor of the newspaper. As of the 1950s, Ohannes Aghbashian (leader of the Armenian section of the Lebanese Communist Party) was the editor of Joghovourti Tsayn.

== See also ==
- Haratch (weekly)
- Gantch
