= Ararad SA =

Lebanese football club

Ararad
- Full name: Ararad Sports Association
- Founded: 1969; 56 years ago
- Website: http://www.araradsa.org/

Ararad Sports Association (Arabic: جمعية ارارات الرياضيه; Western Armenian: Արարատ Մարզական Միութիւն; Armenian: Արարատ Մարզական Միություն) is a Lebanese-Armenian sports and cultural organization. Established in 1969, the club is considered a continuation of the Lebanese-Armenian club Pagramian. Although the club has sympathizers from various circles, it is regarded as an association with left-wing leanings.

== History ==
After Pagramian had been closed by the Lebanese government in 1960 for its affiliation with the Lebanese Communist Party, Ararad Sports Association was set up to fill the void in 1969.

In 1976, at the height of the Lebanese Civil War, the extreme right-wing Phalangist Party (Kataeb) militia confiscated the locale of the association for its political leanings; this put a halt to the club's activities. The president of the association, Simon Kazandjian, was killed along with a relative, Kevork Kazandjian.

With the establishment of more peaceful conditions in Lebanon, Ararad Sports Association regrouped in 1988 forming a new administrative committee. The club also launched their football team that played in Lebanese Third Division.

In 1996, the club restored its right to repossess its confiscated locale after negotiations with the Phalangist party leaders. The club also found support from Lebanese Prime Minister Rafic Hariri, who also contributed funds allowing the club to purchase the locale. The opening ceremony event of the revamped club was also sponsored by Hariri himself.

On 4 June 2009, Ararad formed their chess division. On 21 June 2012, they disbanded their football team.
