= Théâtre de Dix-Heures =

Lebanese comic theatrical group

Le Théâtre de Dix-Heures (English: The 10 O’clock Theater, Arabic: مسرح الساعة العاشرة) was a Lebanese comic theatrical group which functioned between 1962 and 1978 before being revived in 1986.

== History ==
in 1962, le Théâtre de Dix-Heures was established by Gaston Chikhani, Pierre Gédéon, Abdallah Nabbout (Dudul), and Edmond Hanania. In 1978, Le Théâtre de Dix-Heures made their final performance at the Casino du Liban.

Eight years later, in 1986, Michel Chikahni, Jean-Pierre Chikhani (Sons of Gaston Chikhani), Pierre Chammassian, and André Jadaa revived the group. In 1991, Le Théâtre de Dix-Heures performed ten plays in eleven years. After that, Michel Jean-Pierre Chikhani continued Le Théâtre. Jadaa and Chammassian left to form Les Diseurs.

== Cast ==
1986: Michel Chikhani, Pierre Chammassian, Jean-Pierre Chikhani, Andre Jadaa, Ramona Cambar

1987 - 1989: Pierre Chammassian, Jean-Pierre Chikhani, Andre Jadaa, Michel Chikhani, Patricia Ghobrile, Najwa Ghanem

1990 - 1996: Andre Jadaa, Michel Chikhani, Pierre Chammassian, Leila Estphan, Chantal Abi Samra, Elissar Khoury

1996 - 2006: Michel Chikhani, Jean-Pierre Chikhani, Mirna Ghaoui, Georges Khoury, Carole Aoun, Sévine Abi Aad, Joseph Karam, Georges Cherfane, Nancy El Ahmar

== Theatrical plays ==
1986–1997
Cates sur l'etable
J'y suis j'y reste
Baabda La Meen (Baabda Lamine)
Min Malja La Malja (part one)
Min Malja La Malja (part two)
Letletin Ou Bass
Intikhabet Garabet
Maded La Njaded
Rafaou El 3achra
El Zalami Beki Lal Alfeyn

== See also ==
- Sami Khayat
- Pierre Chamassian

== Sources ==
- Le Théâtre de 10 heures
