= Armenian Evangelical Shamlian Tatigian Secondary School =

Private institution in Beirut, Lebanon

- Bourj Hammoud, Mount Lebanon; Lebanon

Information
- Type: Private
- Established: 1934
- Grades: Kindergarten - Secondary
- Religious affiliation: Armenian Evangelical Church

The Armenian Evangelical Shamlian Tatigian Secondary School (Armenian: Հայ Աւետարանական Շամլեան Թաթիկեան Երկրորդական Վարժարան) is in Bourj Hammoud, a suburb to the north east of Beirut, Lebanon.

It opened in the 1930s in Nor Marash in Bourj Hammoud, an area mainly inhabited by Armenians who came from Cilicia, Anatolia after the 1915 Armenian Genocide.

In 1964 the name was changed to Armenian Evangelical Shamlian-Tatigian Secondary School. The school compound includes the Nor Marsh Armenian Evangelical Church.
