= Kasbar Ipegian =

Lebanese Armenian founder of the Hamazkayin Theater Association

Kasbar Ipegian (b. 1883 - d. 1952) was a Lebanese Armenian and one of the most important figures of Armenian theater. Ipegian was a lawyer by profession; he had studied at the Sorbonne in Paris and had a talent for learning foreign languages. Rather than pursue the practice of law, he became involved with shaping Armenian theater in Armenian diaspora communities around in the world including Tbilisi, Istanbul, Tehran, Baghdad and Egypt. Not long after Hamazkayin was first established in Beirut, Ipegian directed the Levon Shant play Oshin Bail and personally wrote the script for Ara and Shamiram. He became chairman of the Beirut Committee of Hamazkayin; in 1941, during his tenure as chairman, Ipegian created the Hamazkayin Theater Association, which put on plays by Shant. Papken Papazian was involved in the Association's 1943 production called Bebeks (My baby). Ipegian died in 1952. The Hamazkayin Theater Association was renamed the Hamazkayin Kasbar Ipegian Theater Company in his honor.
