= Lazzaro (producer) =

Armenian record producer

Lazzaro (Armenian: Լազզարո) is an Armenian record producer. Lazzaro has collaborated with many prominent Armenian, Russian and Greek musicians, such as Iveta Mukuchyan, Sirusho, Aram Mp3, Sofi Mkheyan, Nyusha, Sakis Rouvas and DerHova.

== Early life ==
Lazzaro was born in Beirut, Lebanon, where he started in kindergarten. After some time, his family moved to Yerevan. He has studied at Yerevan State Medical University. The musician has also lived in Stockholm. Currently, he lives in the United States.

== Discography ==
=== Singles ===
==== As lead artist ====
List of singles
Title	Year	Album
"itself"	2010	Non-album singles

==== As featured artist ====
List of singles
Title	Year	Album
"Freak" (Lazzaro featuring Iveta Mukuchyan)	2012	Non-album singles
"Summer Rain" (Lazzaro featuring Iveta Mukuchyan)	2014	Non-album singles

== Awards ==
Year	Award	Category	City	Result
2015	Armenian Pulse Music Awards	Best Producer of the Year	Yerevan	Won
