= Armenian Apostolic Diocese of Lebanon =

The Armenian Prelacy of Lebanon is an Oriental Orthodox Christian diocese (or eparchy) of the Armenian Apostolic Church in Lebanon. It is within the ecclesiastical jurisdiction of the Catholicossate of the Great House of Cilicia, seated in Antelias. The Prelacy of Lebanon is currently headed by Primate of Lebanon, Archbishop Shahe Panosian.

Armenian Apostolic Prelacy of Lebanon is an independent church body running the religious and social affairs of the sizable Armenian Orthodox population in Lebanon. It is headquartered in Beirut, Lebanon with additional offices established in Bourj Hammoud, a suburb of Beirut. The seat of the Armenian Primate of Lebanon is in St. Vartanants Armenian Apostolic Church in Borj Hamoud near Harboyan Centers

The former Primate of Lebanon, archbishop Aram Keshishian was elected in 1995 as Catholicos of the Great House of Cilicia, with style His Holiness Aram I. He was succeeded by archbishop Kegham Khatcherian, who retired in 2014.

== See also ==
- Armenians in Lebanon
