= Ayk (newspaper) =

Ayk (in Armenian Այգ meaning dawn in Armenian) was an Armenian daily newspaper published in Beirut Mondays to Fridays for the period 1953 to 1975. It was established by Dikran and Lucy Tosbat, as an independent non-partisan Armenian daily in stark contrast to the three other Lebanese Armenian dailies that were partisan and official party organs: Aztag, the organ of the Armenian Revolutionary Federation (Tashnag), Ararad, the organ of the Social Democrat Hunchakian Party (Hentchag) and Zartonk, the organ of the Armenian Democratic Liberal Party (ADL – Ramgavar).

Ayk also supported the political aspirations of Mr. Tosbat for being elected for one of the Armenian parliamentary seats reserved for the Armenian Orthodox in the Lebanese Parliament.

== Tosbat's other publications ==
Ayk's founder Dikran Tosbat was already publishing since 1947 the Lebanese French-language daily Le Soir as a rival newspaper to the Lebanese French-language dailies L'Orient (founded by Gabriel Khabbaz and Georges Naccache) and Le Jour (founded in 1934 by Michel Chiha). L'Orient and Le Jour later merged as L'Orient-Le Jour) whereas Le Soir ceased publication.

== As Ike daily ==
The Armenian language newspaper stopped publication with the beginning of the Lebanese Civil War and the decisions of the heirs to immigrate to the United States. The licence was sold to another publisher, the Monday Morning Publishing Group, that published the newspaper as an English language Lebanese daily rename Ike (an alternative transliteration of the licence name Ayk)

Ike was a rival to the well-established Lebanese English-language daily The Daily Star. Ike could not sustain the rivalry, however, and was closed permanently some time later after having incurred persistent financial losses.
