= Shirak (periodical) =

Shirak (in Armenian Շիրակ) was a literary and cultural publication published by the Tekeyan Cultural Union in Lebanon between 1956 and 1978. Published with various frequency (mainly a monthly, but at times as bi-monthly or as a quarterly with some interruptions), it had a wide range of contributions to Armenian writers and literary figures of the Armenian diaspora in addition to giving space for contributions from writers in Soviet Armenia. Main contributors included Zareh Melkonian, Onnig Sarkisian, Vatche Ghazarian, Haig Nakashian and Jirair Tanielian. It also published critiques and reviews of books, theatre, classical music etc.
