= Nidal Al Achkar =

Lebanese actress and theater director

- نضال الاشقر
- Born: Nidal Asad Al Achkar; October 4, 1941 (age 84); Dik El Mehdi, Mount Lebanon Governorate, Lebanon
- Occupation: Director. Actress. Founder of Al Madina Theater
- Years active: 1967–present
- Spouse: Fouad Naïm
- Children: Omar Naïm, and Khaled Naïm

Nidal Al Achkar (Arabic: نضال الأشقر; born 4 October 1941) is a Lebanese actress and founder/director of the Al-Madina Theatre in Beirut.

== Personal life ==
Nidal was born in Dik El Mehdi, Matn District in Mount Lebanon Governorate. She is the daughter of Asad Al Achkar, the Syrian Social Nationalist Party politician. Her younger brother, Ghassan, is also a member of SSNP. She studied at the Royal Academy of Dramatic Arts in London. In 1967 she directed her first play in Beirut, and went on to found the Beirut Theatre Workshop in the late 1960s. Nidal Al Achkar is married to Fouad Naïm and is mother of Omar Naim and Khaled Naïm.

== Career ==
After Nidal graduated from the Royal Academy of Dramatic Arts (RADA), her encounter and training with John Littlewood changed her vision about theatre. She founded “The Beirut Theatre Workshop” in 1968. In 1984, Nidal Al-Achkar established the “Arab Actors” theatre company; it was the first troupe of artists found from 13 different Arab countries.

She is currently the founder chairperson and artistic director of Masrah Al-Madina Cultural and Arts Center. The Center is composed of two performance areas, a training section, an exhibition hall, and a coffee shop. Both Nidal and Masrah Al-Madina aim to continue to promote culture, art, and artists, and through them to inspire change and instill new values.

In a 2019 interview she warned that it was impossible to have theater in the Arab world without "real, transformative revolutions" which would allow freedom of speech and openness.

== Achievements ==
- In 1997, Nidal received the honor of Chevalier De L'Ordre des Arts et des Lettres by the French Ministry of Culture.
- In 2012, Nidal received the Lifetime Achievement Award at the Murex d'Or. Presenting the award, Lebanese Minister of Culture Gabi Layyoun called her "Lebanon's true expression of enlightenment and culture".
- Nidal also received high cultural honors from the Tunisian president.
- Nidal was honored with numerous awards and knighthood in Lebanon, most notably, The National Order of the Cedar from the president of the Lebanese Republic (2016), and the Silver Lebanese order of Merit (2019).
- She was honored by several Lebanese universities like Lebanese American University, and Antonine University. The minister of culture launched the "Nidal Al Achkar Annual Prize" for performing arts in Choueifat theatre 2018.
