= Hask (periodical) =

Armenian religious journal in Lebanon

- Cover of an issue of Hask
- Frequency: Periodical (varying)
- Publisher: Holy See of Cilicia
- Founded: 1932
- Country: Lebanon
- Based in: Beirut
- Language: Armenian

Hask (in Armenian Հասկ) is a Lebanese-Armenian publication published by the Armenian Catholicosate of the Great House of Cilicia in Lebanon and the official organ of the Armenian Apostolic Church - (Holy See of Cilicia) worldwide.

Hask was established in January 1932 by Coadjutor-Catholicos Papken I. Hask means "ear of corn" in Armenian language. Papken I wrote the following in its first editorial: "The ear of corn symbolizes the Kingdom of God. Hask will become a monthly publication reporting the activities of our Catholicosate and its Dioceses. It will grant the opportunity to our faithful to receive authentic and regular information from the source. Also, it will include religious, literary and other subjects."

Hask covers the official activities of the Catholicosate and its Dioceses, and publishes encyclicals, official statements, sermons and religious and literary articles. The current editor is Very Reverend Father Krikor Chiftjian.

Licensed as a monthly publication, Hask religious Armenian-Apostolic (Orthodox) publication is now published with varying frequencies (monthly, bi-monthly, quarterly) as a small-size periodical.
