= Gantch =

- Type: Weekly
- Editor: Barouyr Yeretsian
- Founded: February 20, 1971
- Ceased publication: November 2006
- Political alignment: Communist
- Language: Armenian
- Headquarters: Beirut
- Sister newspapers: An-Nidaa
- OCLC number: 61385969

Gantch (Armenian: Կանչ, "Call") was an Armenian language weekly newspaper published in Beirut, Lebanon in 1971–1983 and then again 1996–2006. It was an organ of the Lebanese Communist Party, and functioned as the Armenian-language edition of the main party organ an-Nidaa. Barouyr Yeretsian served as the editor of Gantch.

The newspaper was launched on February 20, 1971. Gantch covered political, social and cultural issues. It also had a sports section.

It provided extensive coverage of the Soviet Union and the Armenian SSR and propagated fraternity of Arab and Armenian peoples, anti-imperialism and anti-Zionism. The newspaper cooperated with TASS and Armenpress.

Publication of the newspaper was interrupted in 1983. In its stead, the Communist Party began publishing Azkayin Mshagouyt («Ազգային Մշակույթ», "National Culture"). Gantch was relaunched in 1996, and was closed down in November 2006, two months after the death of Yeretsian.

== See also ==
- Joghovourti Tsayn
