= Pierre Chammassian =

Lebanese comedian

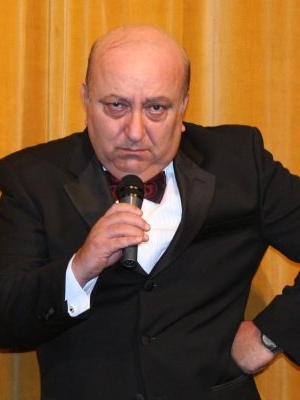

Pierre Chammassian (born in Bourj Hammoud on 9 March 1949, Beirut, Lebanon) is a Lebanese-Armenian comedian, actor and stand-up comic, popular in Lebanon with Arabs and Armenians, as well as in the Armenian Diaspora.
