= Bourj Hammoud =

Bourj Hammoud بُرْجُ حَمُّودٍ Պուրճ Համուտ
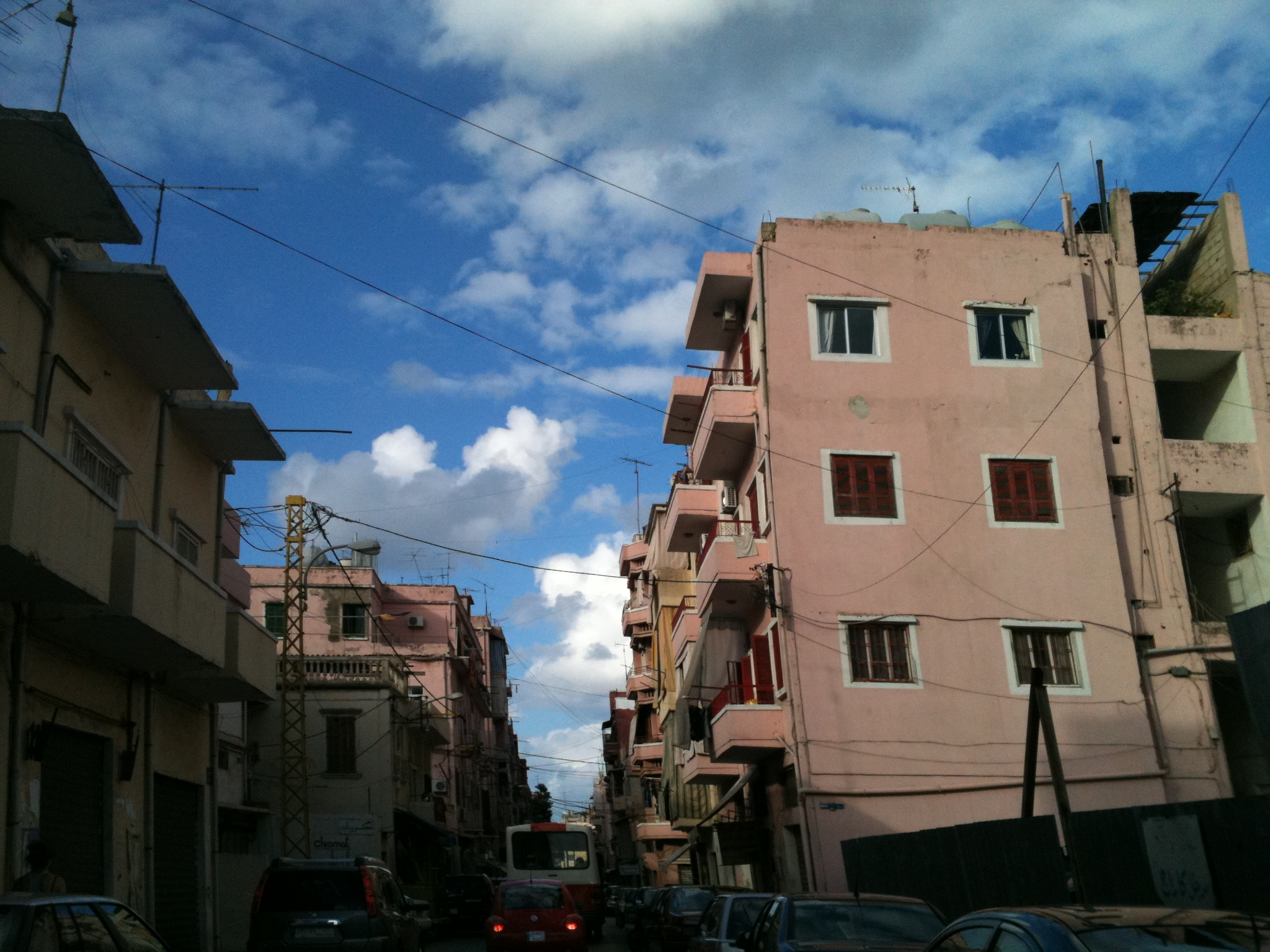
- A narrow street in Bourj Hammoud

- Seal

- Location in Lebanon
- Coordinates: 33°53′37.0″N 35°32′25.0″E
- Country: Lebanon
- Governorate: Mount Lebanon Governorate
- District: Matn District

Government
  - Mayor: Mardig Boghossian

Area
  - Total: 2.5 km^{2} (0.97 sq mi)

Population (2005)
  - Total: ~150,000−175,000
- Time zone: +2
  - Summer (DST): +3

Bourj Hammoud (also spelled Burj Hammud; Arabic: بُرْجُ حَمُّودٍ, romanized: Burj Hammūd; Armenian: Պուրճ Համուտ) is a town and municipality in Lebanon located north-east of the capital Beirut, in the Matn District, and is part of Greater Beirut. The town is heavily populated by Lebanese Armenians.

Bourj Hammoud is a mixed residential, industrial and commercial area and is one of the most densely populated districts in the Middle East. Bourj Hammoud has a major waterfront (river and sea) at Beirut's north gateway that, however, underwent an anarchic urban development.

== History ==
=== Early history ===
Bourj Hammoud was settled by Armenians who had survived the death marches in Deir ez-Zor (Syria) during the Armenian genocide. They arrived in Beirut after the collapse of the Ottoman Empire and were given the right to construct shacks on the eastern banks of the Beirut River, which consisted of swamps and marshy lands at the time. They were then allowed to erect houses and buildings which stand to this day. In 1952, Bourj Hammoud became an independent municipality and is currently a member of the Metn-North group of municipalities.

The founding father of Bourj Hammoud and its municipality was the Armenian Catholic Father Boghos Ariss who was instrumental in laying the foundations of a bustling city and center for the Lebanese Armenian community and served as its mayor for many years. The municipality named a main street in Bourj Hammoud after him in acknowledgement of his sizable contributions to the establishment and development of the city.

During its founding and early settlement, Bourj Hammoud was also the focus of a rivalry between two Armenian political parties, the Armenian Revolutionary Federation and the Social Democrat Hunchakian Party, who struggled to control the newly established shanty-town. This led to various altercations and assassinations that gripped the Armenian community of Lebanon. This climaxed during the Lebanon crisis of 1958, around the time when the two parties and their supporters became polarized due to a religious dispute over which catholicos would be the leader of the Armenian Apostolic Church. However, in the midst of increasing sectarian strife in the late 1960s and early 1970s, Lebanon's Armenian community began to close ranks, and in 1972, the Hunchakian Party ran a joint ticket with the Dashnaks.

=== Civil war ===
The Lebanese Civil War threatened the existence of Beirut's Armenian community. Armenians felt the need to stick close to each other during those turbulent times, thus, they assembled in Bourj Hammoud. Armenian presence was already evident in Bourj Hammoud by its multiple Armenian community centers and churches.

During the Lebanese Civil War, many young Armenians took arms to defend it from the opposing forces. However, the Armenian Revolutionary Federation, the Armenian political party representing the majority of Armenians in the diaspora, tried its best to remain neutral. Because of the Armenian policy of neutrality, Maronite militia groups kept the inhabitants of Bourj Hammoud under strong pressure, even attacking the quarter of Bourj Hammoud, but failed to take over it as the Armenian Revolutionary Federation along other Armenian political parties took arms and defended the city.

=== 2006 Israel–Lebanon conflict ===
During the 2006 Israel–Lebanon conflict, refugees were welcomed into Bourj Hammoud's churches, schools and other complexes where they were fed and given shelters. After the conflict, Turkey proposed to send some of its troops to Lebanon as a part of UNIFIL. Most Armenians strongly opposed Turkish involvement. They held demonstrations against the Turkish force in Bourj Hammoud.

=== 2020 Beirut Port explosion ===
Bourj Hammoud, located near the port, felt the catastrophic effects of the Beirut blast on August 4th, 2020, further exacerbating the city's already dire economic and financial crisis.

== Geography ==
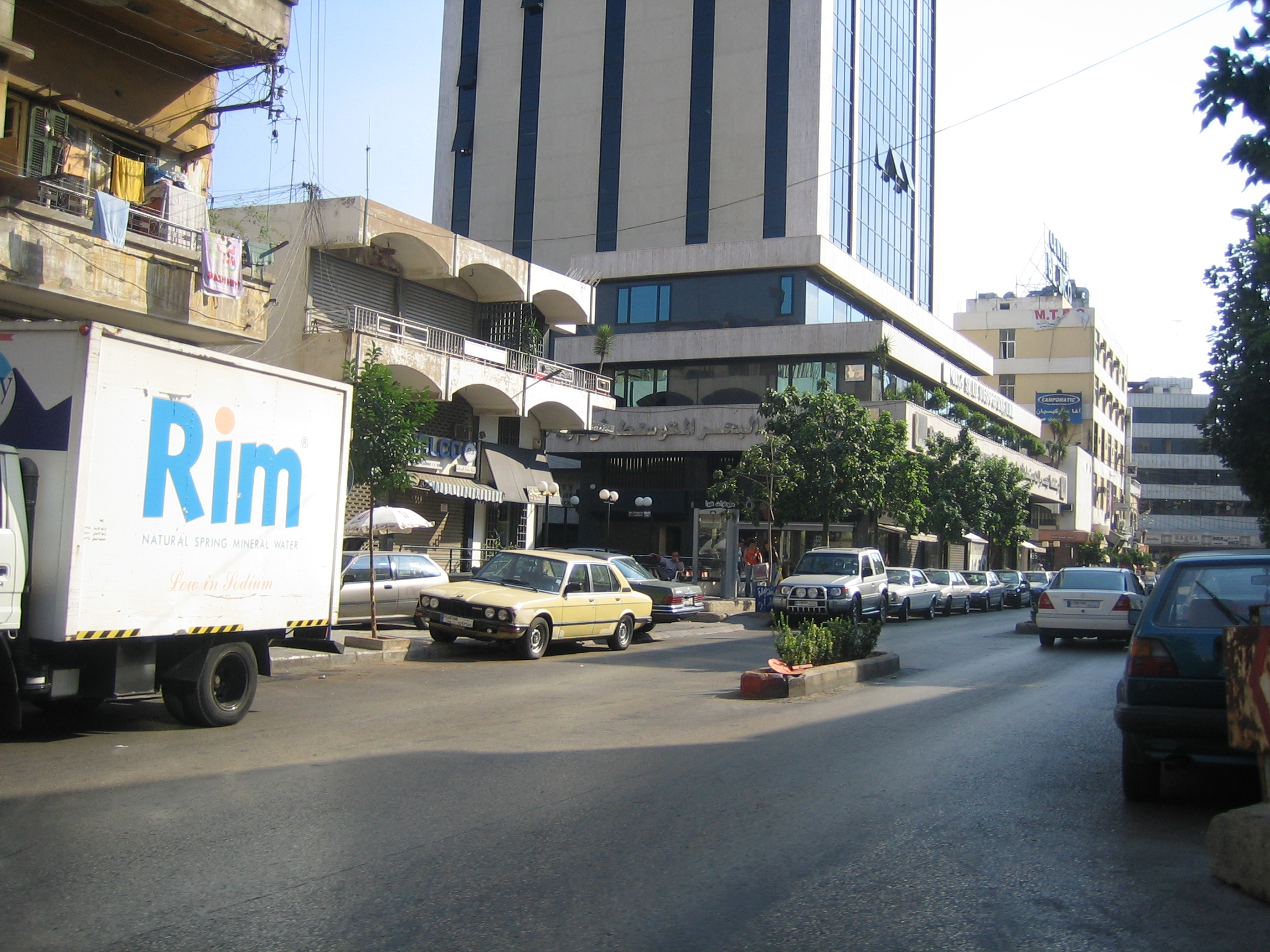
City Mall in a commercial area in Bourj Hammoud

Bourj Hammoud is located just off of the highway and surrounded by the communities of Dora, Karantina, Sin el Fil and Achrafieh.

Most residential buildings and houses in Bourj Hammoud were built from the 1930s to the 1970s. They are usually from two to four stories high. The housing structure looks Balkan, with wooden balconies hanging over the mostly narrow streets of the suburb. Most commercial activity is done at street level. The city is dynamic and industrious, although it faces some environmental issues due to its location at the edge of Beirut. It is crisscrossed by motorways and turns its back to the sea, from which it has reclaimed a few hectares of land. Bourj Hammoud has numerous churches, schools, cultural centers and institutions located in its vicinity.

== Demographics ==
Religion in Bourj Hammoud (2014)
Religion	Percent
Christian	91.50%
Shia Islam	6.36%
Sunni Islam	1.75%
Others	0.39%

In 2014, Christians made up 91.50% and Muslims made up 8.18% of registered voters in Bourj Hammoud. 51.70% of the voters were Armenian Orthodox, 12.78% were Armenian Catholics, 7.34% were Greek Orthodox, 6.41% were Maronite Catholics and 6.36% were Shiite Muslims.

While a widespread stereotype persists in Lebanon that Bourj Hammoud is an Armenian-majority location, a study by a Christian NGO in 2006 found evidence contradicting this claim. In the study, it was reported that only one district of the city was actually populated mainly by Armenians, and the city was actually composed of other Christian groups.

== Notable people ==
- Pierre Chammassian (1949), Lebanese Armenian comedian.
- Hassan Nasrallah (1960–2024), the third secretary-general of the Iranian-backed Shiite group Hezbollah.
- Karim Pakradouni (1944), attorney and politician of Armenian origin. Influential member and leader of the Kataeb Party.
- Christina Sawaya (1980), Miss International 2002.

== See also ==
- Armenians in Lebanon
- List of Armenian ethnic enclaves
- The Fifth Column
