= Karadeniz Holding =

Turkish energy company

- Company type: Private
- Industry: Energy, Powership
- Founded: 1948; 78 years ago
- Founder: Rauf Osman Karadeniz
- Headquarters: Istanbul, Turkey
- Area served: Worldwide
- Website: www.karadenizholding.com

Karadeniz Holding is a Turkish conglomerate operating in multiple sectors, including shipbuilding through Karmarine and the energy field through its subsidiary Karpowership. It is based in Istanbul, Turkey.

== History ==
Karadeniz Holding was founded by Rauf Osman Karadeniz in 1948. The group started its energy investments in 1996 with its first land-based power plant in southern Turkey. In 2003, it became the first private electricity exporter in Turkey, followed by its first Powership agreement signed with Iraq in 2010.

In July 2025, Karadeniz Holding's energy transition arm, Kinetics, signed a partnership agreement with Japan-based shipping company MOL to jointly develop the world’s first floating data center platform.

=== Karmarine ===
Karpowership’s floating power plants, known as Powerships, are designed and constructed at shipyards including Karmarine. Karmarine was established in 2015 in the Yalova shipyard zone and covers approximately 105,000 square meters and is involved in the design, construction, conversion, maintenance, and repair of various types of vessels, including Powerships.

=== One World Karadeniz Foundation ===
The One World Karadeniz Foundation is a non-profit organization established in 2024 by Karadeniz Holding to consolidate the company’s corporate social responsibility activities. The foundation focuses on education, women's empowerment, environmental sustainability, gender equality, and humanitarian aid.

=== Lifeships ===
Lifeships are emergency aid vessels developed by Karadeniz Holding to provide both immediate relief and longer-term support to disaster-affected communities. Each vessel is equipped with facilities for food service, medical care, childcare, and education, with the capacity to support up to 1,500 people.

Following the Türkiye–Syria earthquake on February 6, 2023, Karadeniz Holding deployed the first Lifeship, Süheyla Sultan, to the port city of İskenderun in Hatay Province. Over the course of its deployment, the vessel provided shelter and services to approximately 12,000 survivors.

== Ships operated by Karpowership ==
- Doğan Bey (2010)
- Rauf Bey (2010)
- Kaya Bey (2011)
- Alican Bey (2011)
- İrem Sultan (2012)
- Fatmagül Sultan (2013)
- Orhan Bey (2013)
- Esra Sultan (2015)
- Zeynep Sultan (2015)
- Osman Khan (2016)
- Onur Sultan (2016)
- Gökhan Bey (2016)
- Yasin Bey (2016)
- Mehmet Bey (2018)
- Nezih Bey (2018)
- Koray Bey (2018)
- Barış Bey (2019)
