= Sedef Shipyard =

Turkish shipyard

Coordinates: 40°50′32″N 29°17′11″E

Sedef Gemi İnşaatı A.Ş.
- Company type: Shipyard
- Industry: Defence, Shipbuilding
- Founded: 1972; 54 years ago
- Headquarters: Tuzla, Istanbul, Turkey
- Products: Warships, Cargo ships, Yachts, Powerships
- Net income: ▲ ($250) million
- Number of employees: 2,000
- Parent: Turkon Holding
- Website: http://www.sedefshipyard.com/en/

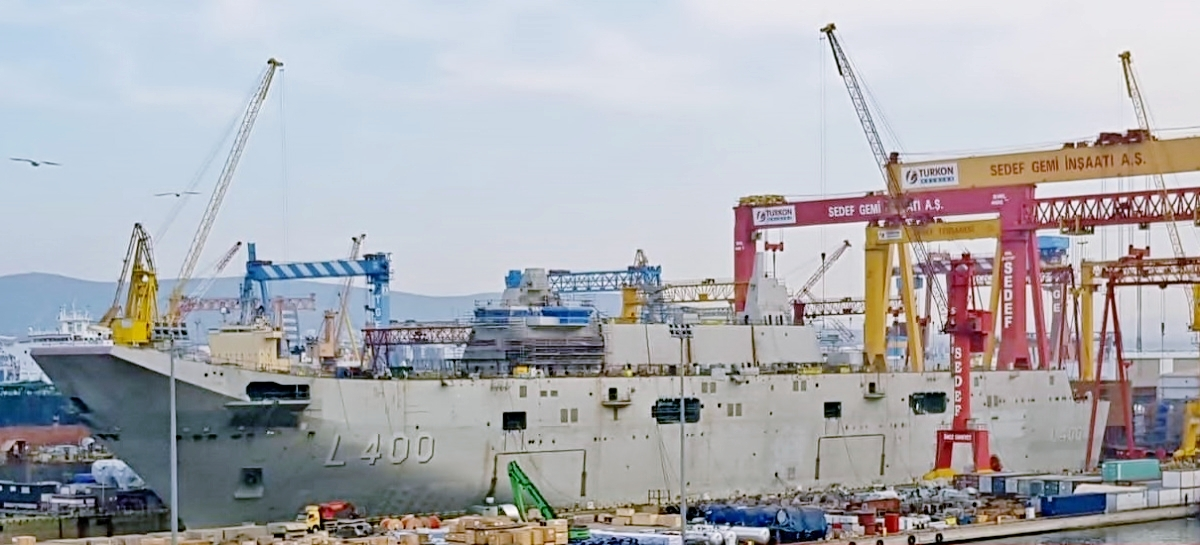
The drone-carrying amphibious assault ship TCG Anadolu at Sedef Shipyard in Istanbul. The construction of a sister ship, to be named TCG Trakya, is currently planned by the Turkish Navy.

Sedef Shipyard (Turkish: Sedef Tersanesi) is a Turkish shipyard established in Gebze, Kocaeli in 1972. The shipyard moved to Tuzla, Istanbul in 1990. The shipyard is building defense industry ships and commercial ships such as the multipurpose amphibious assault ship TCG Anadolu to be used by the Turkish Naval Forces. In 2000, the shipyard became a subsidiary of Turkon Holding.

The shipyard was qualified in 2009 by obtaining the necessary documents to take part in military projects. In 2013, the company won the tender for a multipurpose amphibious assault ship project, which will be the largest ship in the Turkish Navy and can carry one battalion. Within the scope of this project, the construction of TCG Anadolu started in 2015 and the ship was launched in 2019.

The construction of a sister ship, to be named TCG Trakya, is currently planned by the Turkish Navy.

== Location ==
Sedef Shipbuilding Inc, has 2 main locations in Turkey:

- Tuzla, Istanbul
- Orhanlı, Istanbul

== Products ==
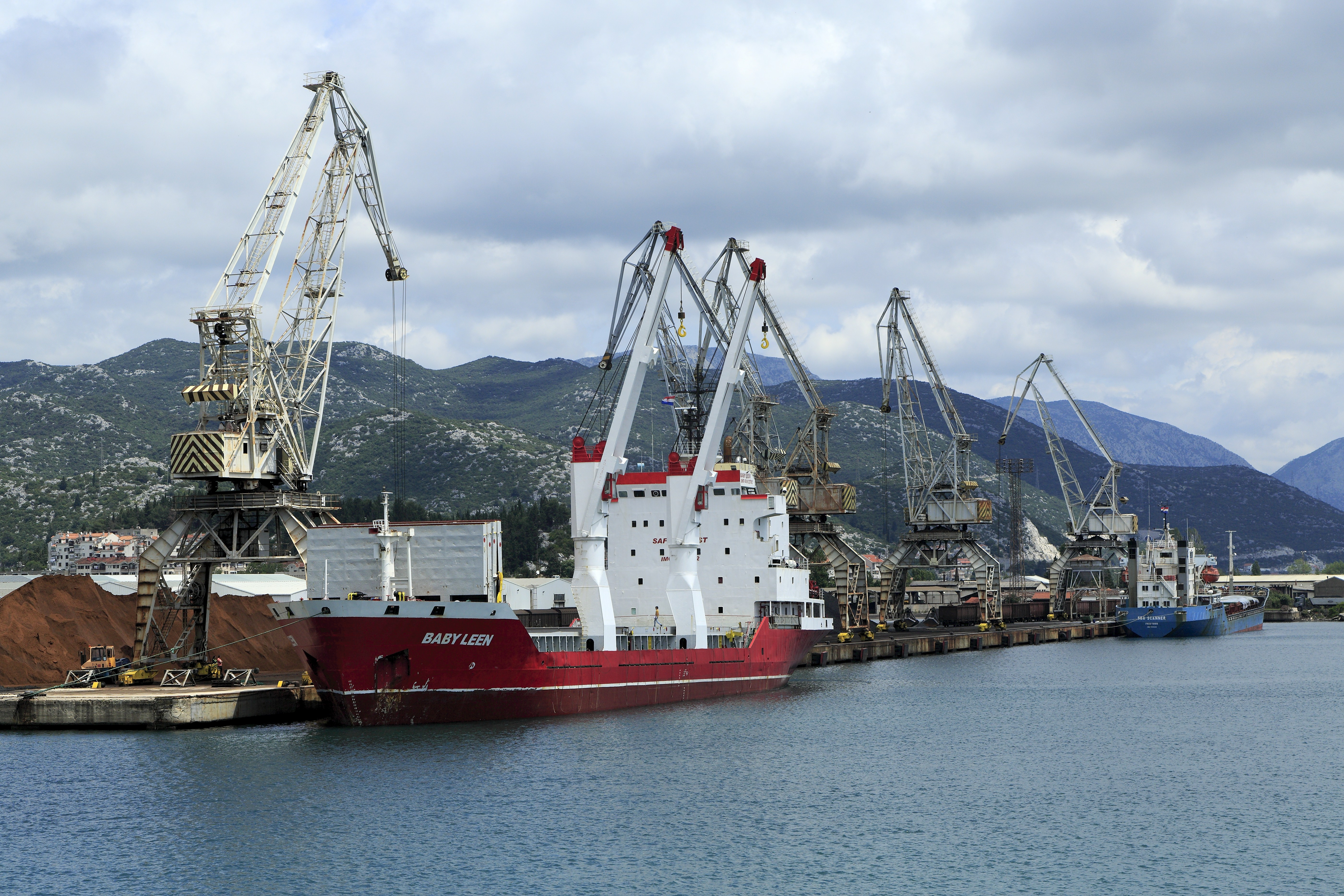
Baby Leen IMO 8912792, multi-purpose dry cargo ship, built in 1991 as Ochockoě (Охоцкое) at the Sedef shipyard in Istanbul, often sold and renamed during its service life, as Arctic Sea.

- TCG Anadolu
- MV Arctic Sea
- MV Karadeniz Powership Ayşegül Sultan
- MV Karadeniz Powership Doğan Bey
- MV Karadeniz Powership Fatmagül Sultan
- MV Karadeniz Powership Gökhan Bey
- MV Karadeniz Powership İrem Sultan
- MV Karadeniz Powership Onur Sultan
- MV Karadeniz Powership Orhan Bey
- MV Karadeniz Powership Osman Khan
- MV Karadeniz Powership Yasin Bey
- MV Karadeniz Powership Zeynep Sultan

== See also ==
- Ships built at Sedef Shipyard
- Anadolu Shipyard
- Gölcük Naval Shipyard
- Istanbul Naval Shipyard
