= MV Karadeniz Powership Alican Bey =

Floating Power Plant

Karadeniz Powership Alican Bey
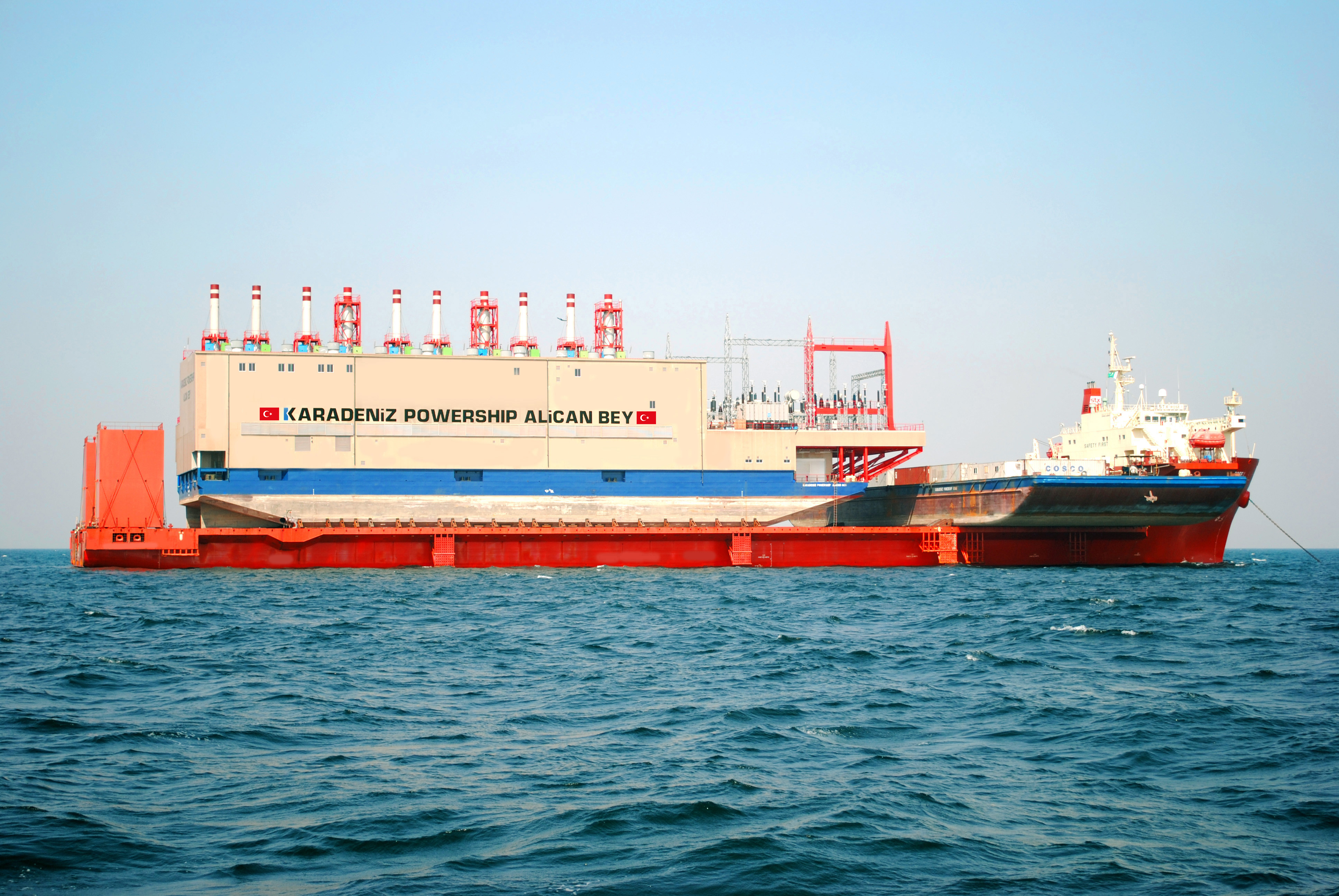
- Karadeniz Powership Alican Bey

History
- Name: Karadeniz Powership Alican Bey; STX Rose 1
- Owner: Karpowership
- Operator: Karpowership
- Builder: Singapore

General characteristics
- Class & type: Special Service-Floating Power Plant
- Capacity: 104.3 MW generation (as Powership)

The MV MV Karadeniz Powership Alican Bey is a power barge, a floating power plant, owned and operated by Karpowership. Built in Singapore and converted into a Powership in Turkey, she was commissioned in 2011 to supply electricity to the power grid in Pakistan.

== Vessel ==
She was built in Singapore as a specialized submersible vessel and christened STX Rose 1.

== Powership ==
End January 2011, she arrived at Port of Karachi, Pakistan joining MV Karadeniz Powership Kaya Bey, the first Powership of the fleet, which came to Korangi on November 17, 2010. The total installed capacity of the two Powerships amounted 330 MW, while the contract capacity of the power purchase agreement was 232 MW. The Powerships were able to meet almost 50% of the electricity power needs of the 18 million people in Karachi.

== Dispute ==
In the wake of political contentions in Pakistan, the Supreme Court of Pakistan declared on March 30, 2011 that all rental power plants (RPP) are illegal and the operating RPPs have to be closed. In March 2012, the Karadeniz Energy Group (Karkey) annulled the energy purchase agreement - a RPP contract- with the Pakistan National Accountability Bureau (NAB), which covered the service of the Powerships MV KPS Kaya Bey and the later stationed MV KPS Alican Bey. The reason was that the Pakistani side failed to perform their obligations in payments and oil supply. By the end of October 2012, the Pakistani government ordered the repayment of the unused deposit in amount of US$17.2 million from the Turkish partner before the ships can leave. Upon a complaint filed by a politician in the Parliament of Pakistan, the Supreme Court of Pakistan ordered the seizure of the retained Powerships due to a fine of US$120 million demanded by the NAB. The case went to international arbitration on March 11, 2013.

On May 16, 2014 after two years of retainment, LPS Kaya Bey left Karachi heading Dubai for repairs and maintenance in compliance with an intermediate decision of the International Centre for Settlement of Investment Disputes (ICSID). On August 1 the same year, a second decision of the ICSID enabled the definitive and lasting release of the Powership.

The dispute was also subject of talks at highest-level of politicians between the two countries' prime ministers and state presidents. It was reported that KPS Alican Bey and two other vessels of the Turkish company were still in retainment by August 2014.

Tribunal constituted under the World Bank’s arbitral center, ICSID, issued the award in August 2017 in favor of Karkey in the case filed by Karkey against Pakistan. Pakistan has been sentenced to pay the company one of the highest compensation amounts under ICSID.

Prime Minister Imran Khan announced that his government, with the help of Turkish President Recep Tayyip resolved the dispute in Nov. 2019.
