= MV Karadeniz Powership İrem Sultan =

Ship with onboard power plant, built 1984

Karadeniz Powership İrem Sultan
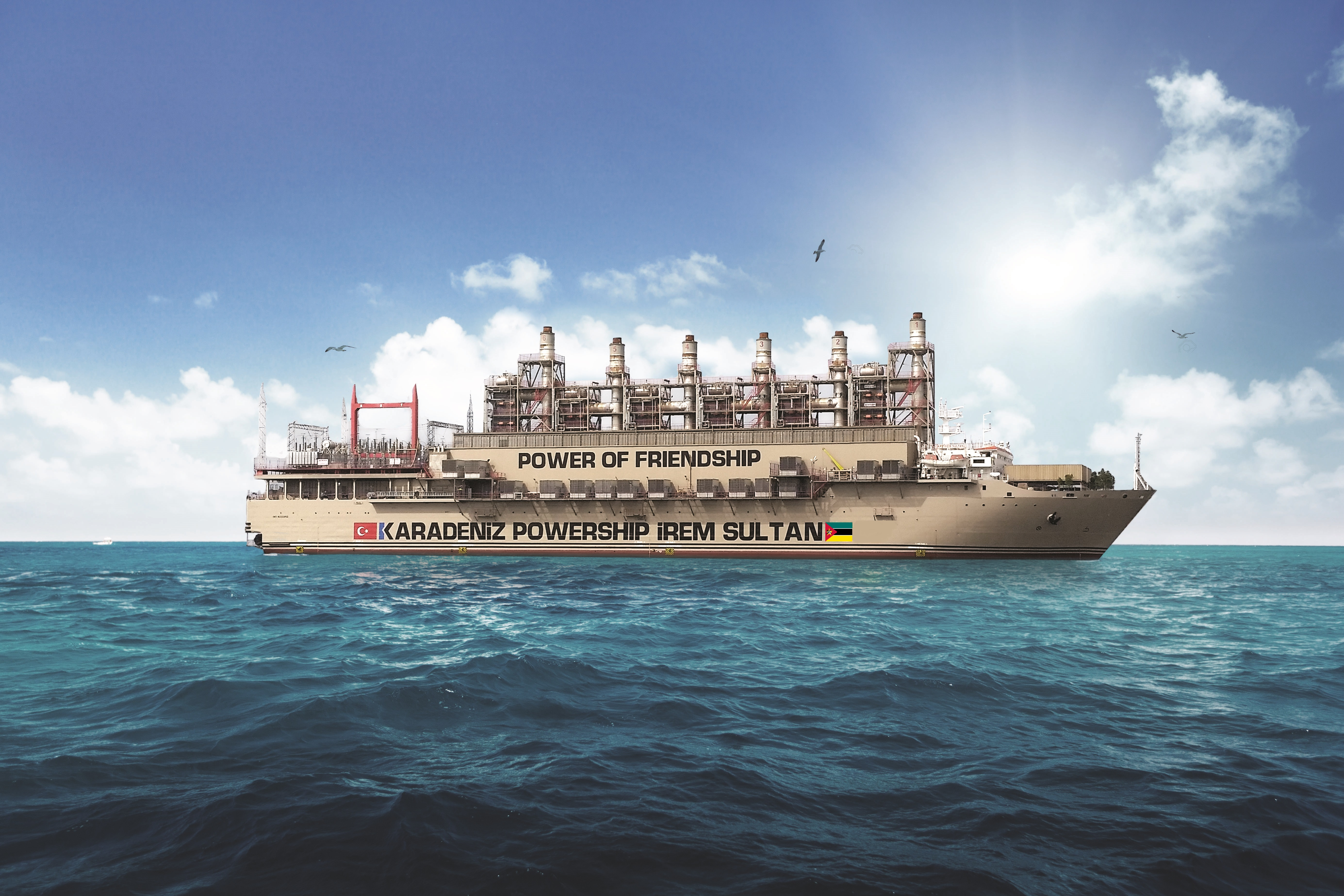
- Karadeniz Powership İrem Sultan

History

Liberia
- Name: İrem Sultan (2010– ); Enterprise (2003–10); Smit Enterprise (1998–03); Danube Express (1992–98); Nikolay Markin (1984–92)
- Owner: Karpowership (2010– ); Dockwise Shipping, Breda, Netherlands (2003–10); Smit Transport & Heavy Lift B.V., Rotterdam, Netherlands (1998–03); Ukrainian Danube Shipping Co., Izmail, Ukraine (1984–98)
- Operator: Karpowership
- Port of registry: Willemstad, Netherlands Antilles (2003–10); (The Bahamas) Nassau, Bahamas (1998–03); Valletta, Malta (1992–98); (Ukrainian Soviet Socialist Republic) Izmail, Ukrainian SSR (1984–92)
- Builder: Fincantieri Marghera in Venice, Italy
- Yard number: 305
- Laid down: November 1983
- Launched: 30 March 1984
- Completed: April 1984
- Home port: Monrovia, Liberia
- Identification: IMO number: 8222252; MMSI number: 636014808; Callsign: A8WQ6

General characteristics
- Class & type: Special Service-Floating Power Plant<; formerly Barge carrier
- Tonnage: 17,395 GT; 7982 NT; 8,727 DWT
- Length: 157.75 m (517 ft 7 in) (LOA)
- Beam: 29.00 m (95 ft 2 in)
- Height: 5.31 m (17 ft 5 in)
- Draught: 4.43 m (14 ft 6 in)
- Installed power: 8,680 kW (11,640 hp)
- Propulsion: 2x GMT Type BL230.12V (230x310); 2x GMT Type BL230.8V (230x310)
- Speed: 12.8 knots (23.7 km/h; 14.7 mph)
- Capacity: 114 MW generation (as Powership)

MV Karadeniz Powership İrem Sultan is a Liberia-flagged powership, a floating power plant, owned and operated by Karpowership. Built in 1984 by the Fincantieri Marghera Shipyard in Venice, Italy and christened MV Nikolay Markin, she sailed as a barge carrier under various names and flags until in 2014 she was converted into a powership at the Sedef Shipyard in Tuzla, Istanbul, Turkey. She served in Nacala, Mozambique supplying electricity to Mozambique's power grid for land-locked Zambia. Currently, she serves in the Dominican Republic, and is stationed in Santo Domingo.

== Barge carrier ==
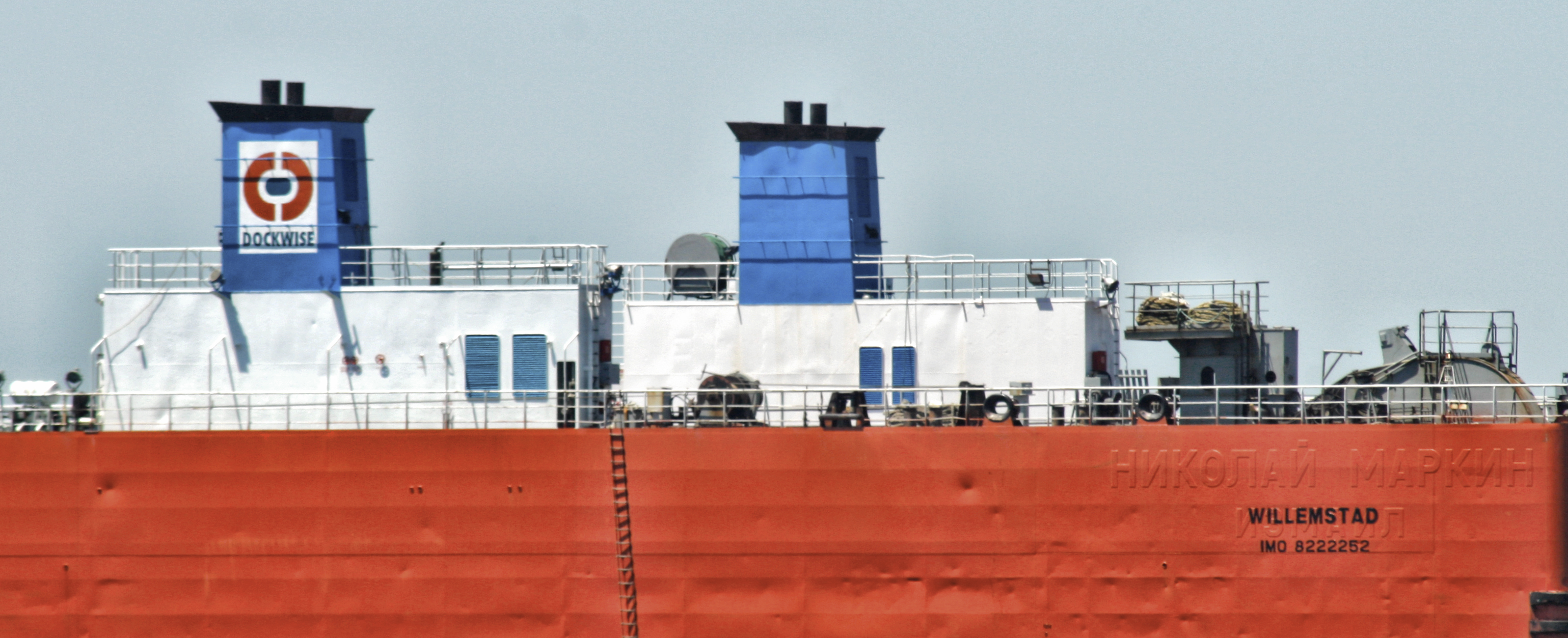
Dutch barge carrier MV Enterpriser of Dockwise Shipping spotted in May 2008.

She was built by the Fincantieri Marghera Shipyard in Venice, Italy with yard number 305 as a barge carrier (LASH carrier) in April 1984. The 157.75 m (517 ft 7 in) (LOA) long vessel has a beam of 29.00 m (95 ft 2 in), a depth of 5.31 m (17 ft 5 in) and a draft of 4.43 m (14 ft 6 in) registered. Two diesel engines of Type GMT BL230.12V (230x310) and two of Type GMT BL230.8V (230x310) manufactured by the Grandi Motori Trieste in Trieste, Italy give a total power of 8,680 kW (11,640 hp) propelling the vessel at 12.8 knots (23.7 km/h; 14.7 mph). By 8,727 DWT and 7982 NT, she has a cargo capacity of 17,395 GT.

She saw service under the names Nikolay Markin, Danube Express, Smit Enterprise and Enterprise before she was sold in August 2010 to Karpowership.

== Powership ==
The originally barge carrier was converted into a Powership at the Sedef Shipyard in Tuzla, Istanbul as the fifth of the fleet. The construction cost €110 million. She was renamed Karadeniz Powership İrem Sultan. The vessel is registered under the Liberian flag with homeport Monrovia.

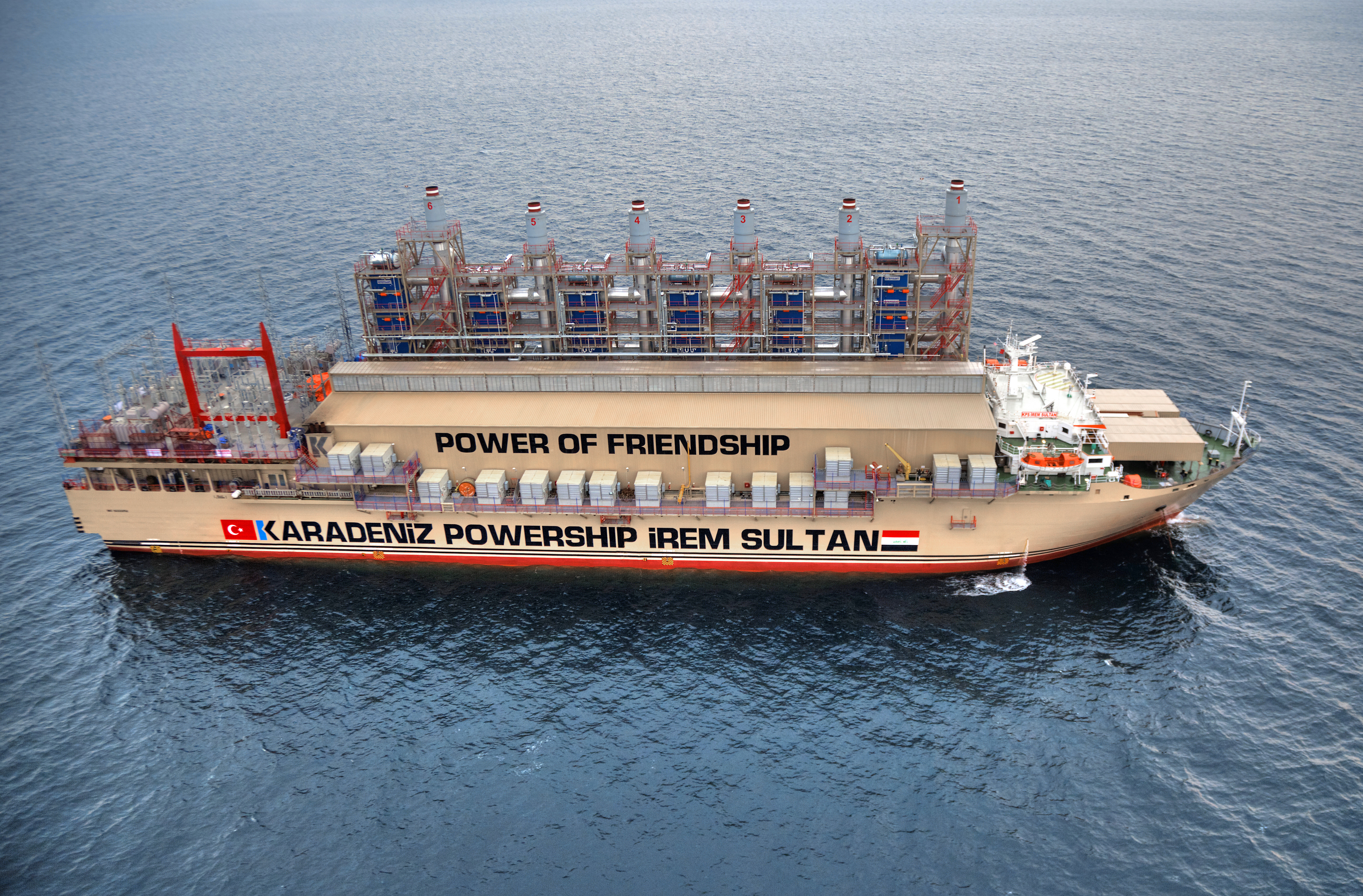
İrem Sultan

She has a generation capacity of 114 MW on dual-fuel (HFO- and gas-fired). In October 2011, the Powership sailed to Basra, Iraq, where she supplied electricity for about one million residents there in a timespan of three years. Two vessels of the fleet, MV Karadeniz Powership Doğan Bey (126 MW) and MV Karadeniz Powership Rauf Bey (180 MW), were already stationed in Iraq to bridge power shortage.

In November 2015, Karpowership was awarded a contract to supply electricity to land-locked Zambia via cross-border interconnected transmission lines through Mozambique and Zimbabwe. Powership started delivering electricity in March 2016, within less than 4 months from contract signing. The contract was to initially supply 100 MW of base load power.

In March 2018, upon the completion of the contract with Zambia, Karpowership signed a new contract with Mozambique’s electricity utility company, Electricdade de Mozambique (EdM) to supply 48 MW of base load power for 5 years.

A similar ship will be built for Adelaide.

In November 2022 she is stationed in the Dominican Republic off of Santo Domingo. As of 2025 October stationed in the Port of Havana Cuba supplying energy to the grid system there.

== Ship's registry ==
- ex-MV Nikolay Markin owned by Ukrainian Danube Shipping Co. based in Izmail, Ukraine registered in the Ukrainian SSR with homeport Izmail until June 14, 1992,
- ex-MV Danube Express owned by Ukrainian Danube Shipping Co. based in Izmail, Ukraine registered in Malta with homeport Valletta until July 1998,
- ex-MV Smit Enterprise owned by Smit Transport & Heavy Lift B.V. based in Rotterdam, Netherlands registered in the Bahamas with homeport Nassau until July 2003,
- ex-MV Enterprise owned by Dockwise Shipping based in Breda, Netherlands registered in the Netherlands Antilles with homeport Willemstad until August 2010.
