= Ishikawajima do Brasil Estaleiros =

Former shipbuilding company in Brazil

Coordinates: 22.8967°S 43.1749°W

- Type: S.A.
- Industry: Shipbuilding, Defence
- Founded: 1959; 67 years ago
- Defunct: 1994; 32 years ago
- Fate: Merged
- Successor: Verolme Ishibrás S.A.
- Headquarters: Rio de Janeiro, Rio de Janeiro (state), Brazil
- Area served: Americas
- Products: Bulkers, Oil tankers, Patrol Boats, Fishing Vessels, Work boats, Platform supply vessels, Research vessels, Tugboats
- Services: Shipbuilding and services
- Parent: Ishikawajima-Harima Heavy Industries

Ishikawajima do Brasil Estaleiros S.A commonly known as ISHIBRÁS was a shipbuilding company based in Rio de Janeiro, Brazil.

The company belonged to the Japanese multinational Ishikawajima-Harima Heavy Industries (IHI Corporation), and settled in Brazil in the late 1950s. The company was sold to the Emaq-Verolme consortium in 1994.

The Brazilian subsidiary, in addition to the ships it has built cranes for ships and cranes for quays and loading yards, and crawler excavators used in the mining area.

== Projects and products ==
- NT Almirante Gastão Motta.
- MV Karadeniz Powership Kaya Bey.
- MV Karadeniz Powership Rauf Bey.

== See also ==
- List of ships of the Brazilian Navy
- Brazilian Marine Corps
- Arsenal de Marinha do Rio de Janeiro
