= MV Karadeniz Powership Ayşegül Sultan =

Karadeniz Powership Esra Sultan
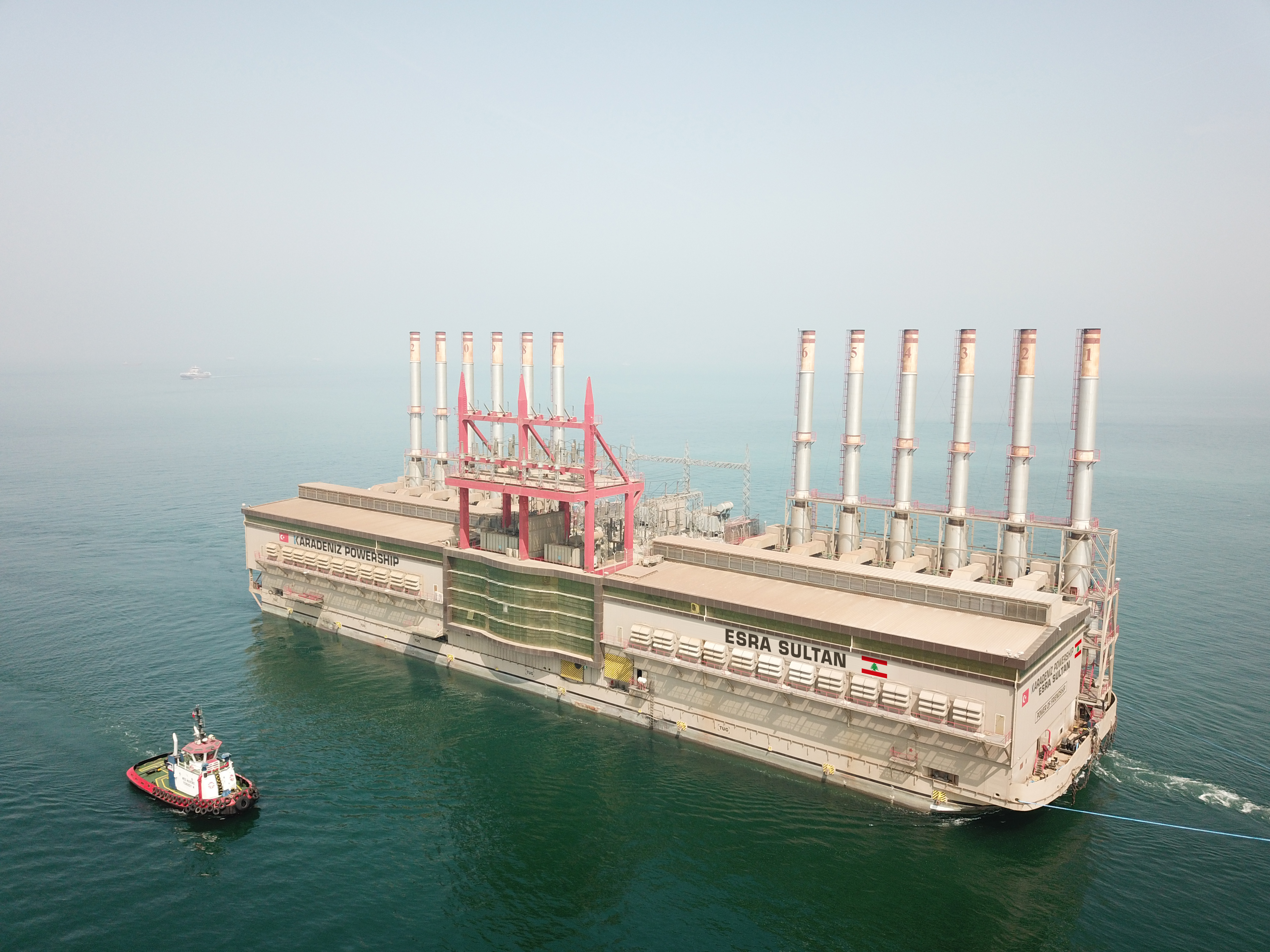
- Karadeniz Powership Esra Sultan

History
- Name: Karadeniz Powership Esra Sultan
- Owner: Karpowership
- Operator: Karpowership
- Completed: 2009

General characteristics
- Class & type: Special Service-Floating Power Plant
- Tonnage: 12,575 GT
- Length: 139.90 m (459 ft 0 in) (LOA)
- Beam: 42.00 m (137 ft 10 in)
- Draught: 8.00 m (26 ft 3 in)
- Capacity: 235 MW generation (as Powership)

The MV Karadeniz Powership Esra Sultan is a Powership, a floating power plant, owned and operated by Karpowership. Built in 2007, it was converted into a Powership in 2015 by Sedef Shipyard in Tuzla, Istanbul, Turkey. She was commissioned to supply electricity to the power grid in Ghana. Currently, she serves in Dakar, Sénégal.

== Ship ==
The vessel is named after the sister of the chairperson of Karadeniz Holding. The 139.90 m (459 ft 0 in) long vessel has a beam of 42.00 m (137 ft 10 in) and a draft of 8.00 m (26 ft 3 in). She has a cargo capacity of 12,575 GT.

== Powership ==
On October 27, 2015, the Powership set sail to Ghana following a farewell ceremony held in Tuzla, Istanbul, where another Powership of the fleet, the MV Karadeniz Powership Zeynep Sultan, also weighed anchor to head to Indonesia. She arrived in Ghana earlier than expected and begin her service at Tema Harbour by December 2015. The powership has an installed capacity of 235 MW.

As of July 2018 the Powership operates in Lebanon.

== Project ==
In June 2014, the Electricity Company of Ghana signed a power purchase agreement for the duration of ten years with Karpower Ghana Co. Ltd., a subsidiary of the Turkey-based Karadeniz Holding's energy wing Karadeniz Energy Group. According to the deal, 450 MW of power will be supplied by two powerships making out 22% of the country's total electricity demand required. Currently, the demand at peak periods stands at 2,120 MW in Ghana as reported by Kwabena Donkor, the Ghanaian Minister of Energy and Petroleum during his attendance at the ceremony held in Istanbul. The project will help to provide a fast solution to bridge medium-term power shortage in the country. The project is the first large-scale powership project in Africa, and is called "Power of Friendship for Ghana".

Apparently, this ship was in the Dominican Republic on October 30, 2023.

== See also ==
- List of power stations in Ghana
- Electricity sector in Ghana
- List of power stations in Lebanon
