= TCG Karadeniz =

TCG Karadeniz is the name of the following ships of the Turkish Navy:

- TCG Karadeniz (F 255), ex-USS Donald B. Beary, a Knox-class frigate acquired in 1994 and decommissioned in 2006
- TCG Karadeniz (F 520), an Istanbul-class frigate under construction

== See also ==
- Karadeniz (disambiguation)
