= TCG Anadolu =

Turkish Navy ship

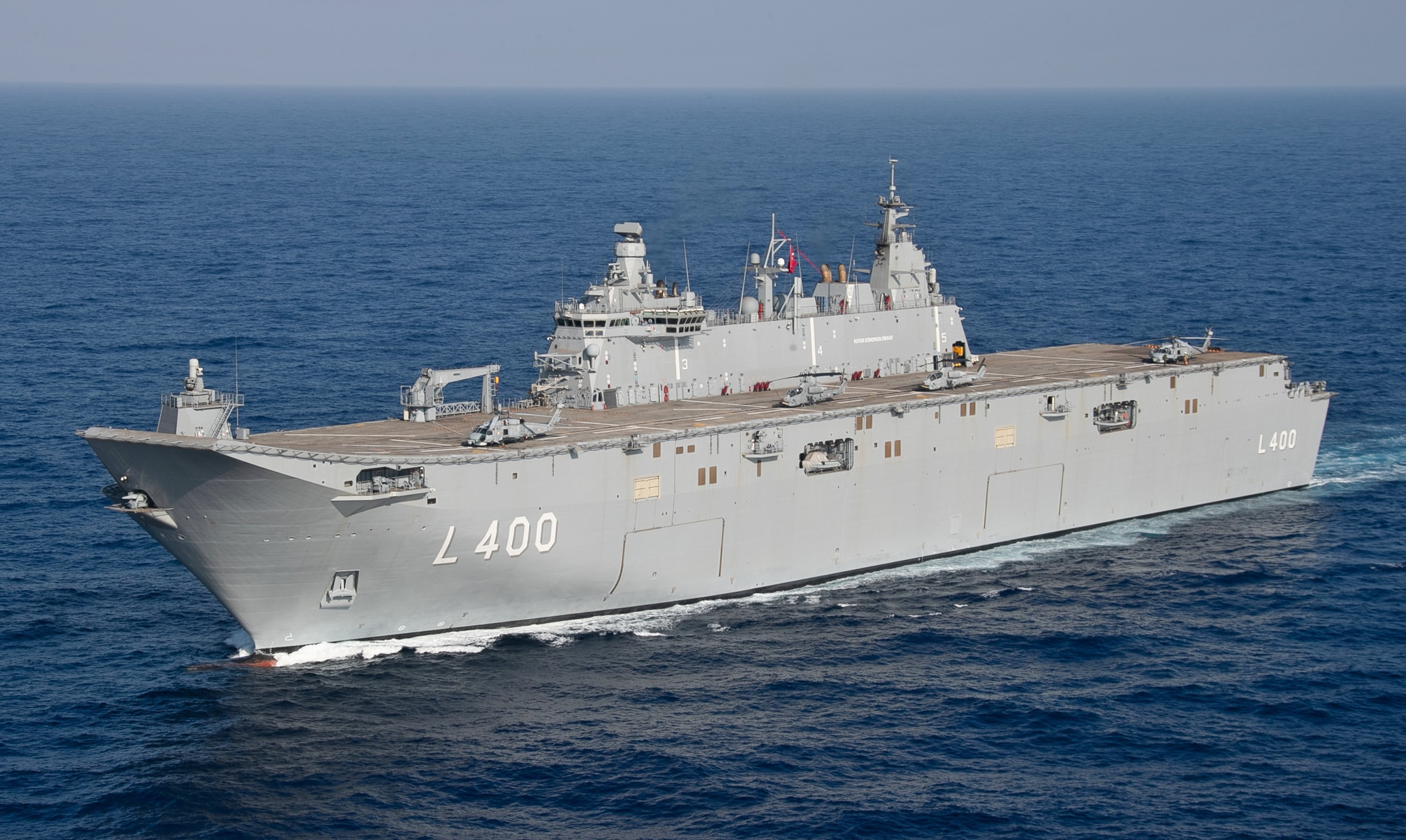
- TCG Anadolu conducting naval exercises in the Mediterranean Sea, August 2023

History

Turkey
- Name: Anadolu
- Namesake: Anatolia
- Ordered: 1 June 2015
- Builder: Sedef Shipbuilding, Inc.
- Cost: Over $1 billion
- Laid down: 7 February 2018
- Launched: 30 April 2019
- Commissioned: 10 April 2023
- Identification: Pennant number: L-400
- Status: In active service

General characteristics
- Class & type: Anadolu class (modified Juan Carlos I-class) drone carrier-amphibious assault ship
- Displacement: 27,436 tons ("amphibious assault ship" configuration); 24,660 tons ("V/STOL aircraft carrier" configuration)
- Length: 232 m (761 ft 2 in)
- Beam: 32 m (105 ft 0 in)
- Height: 58 m (190 ft 3 in)
- Depth: 27.5 m (90 ft 3 in)
- Propulsion: 5 × 8,000 kW (11,000 hp) Navantia Man Diesel Generators; 2 × 11 MW (15,000 hp) Siemens SiPOD; 2 × 1,500 kW (2,000 hp) bow thrusters
- Speed: Maximum speed: 21 knots (39 km/h; 24 mph); Cruise speed: 16 knots (30 km/h; 18 mph)
- Range: 9,000 nautical miles (17,000 km; 10,000 mi) at 16 knots (30 km/h; 18 mph)
- Endurance: 50 days, 30 days without replenishment
- Boats & landing craft carried: 6 xType LCVP
- Capacity: 46 Altay tanks; 77 light vehicles
- Complement: 1223 (371 naval officers and seamen, 50 naval aviation personnel, 50 hospital personnel, 550-700 amphibious marines, others)
- Sensors & processing systems: SMART-S Mk.2 S-band 3D radar, SPN-720 Naval Precision Approach Radar, GENESIS-ADVENT Combat Management System, IRST, IFF, TDL, VMF, SATCOM, LWR, DDS, Torpedo Defense System, Aselsan Piri-100 Infrared Search and Tracking System
- Armament: 1 × RAM; 2 × Phalanx CIWS; 5 × 25 mm Aselsan SMASH 200/25 RCWS; 4 × 12.7 mm Aselsan STAMP RCWS
- Aircraft carried: 30 helicopters; 30 to 50 UCAVs

TCG Anadolu (L-400) is a drone carrier-amphibious assault ship of the Turkish Navy. It is named after the peninsula of Anatolia (Turkish: Anadolu) which forms the majority of the land mass of Turkey. The construction works began on 30 April 2016 at the shipyard of Sedef Shipbuilding Inc. in Istanbul, with the keel being laid on 7 February 2018. TCG Anadolu was commissioned with a ceremony on 10 April 2023. The ship is the world's first flight deck-based specialized military carrier ship of unmanned aerial vehicles.

The vessel is intended to meet the various needs and requirements of the Turkish Armed Forces, such as sustaining long-endurance, long-distance military combat or humanitarian relief operations, while acting as a command center and flagship for the Turkish Navy.

The Sedef–Navantia consortium won the tender for the amphibious assault ship project of the Turkish Navy. Anadolu used the same design as that of the Spanish ship Juan Carlos I. All of the ship's weapon systems were procured by Turkish firms Aselsan and Havelsan. The ship features a Turkish combat management system, the GENESIS-ADVENT, which was integrated by Aselsan and Havelsan. Aircraft landing is assisted in all weather condition by Leonardo SPN-720 Precision Approach Radar.

Navantia provided design, technology transfer, equipment and technical assistance to Sedef Shipyard of Turkey for the design and development of Anadolu. It is reported that the carrier can sail from Istanbul to New York and back, without the need to refuel.

== History ==
=== Design and specifications ===
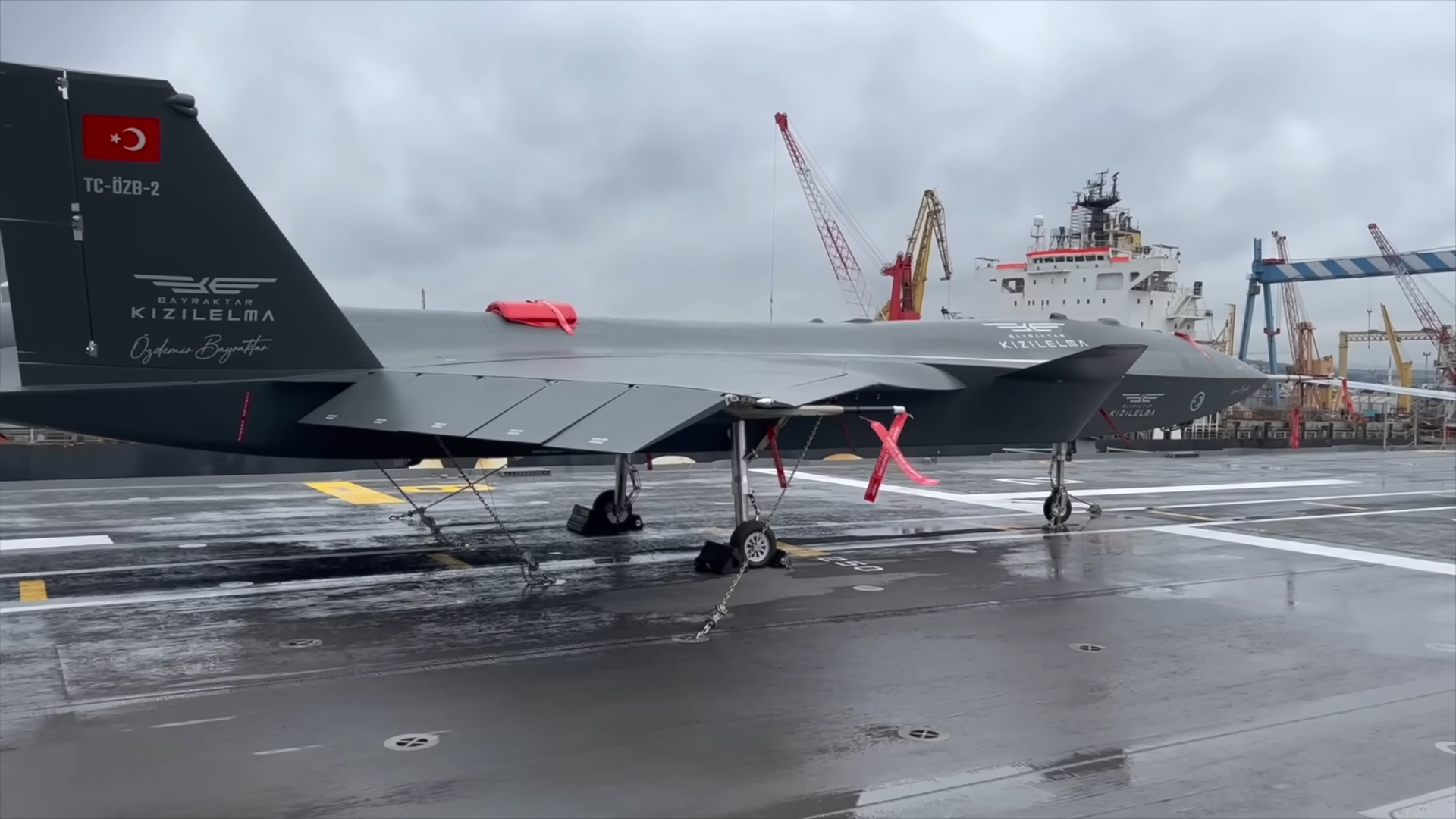
Bayraktar Kızılelma UCAV on the flight deck of TCG Anadolu

In December 2013, the Turkish LPD/LHD program was originally estimated to cost €375 million ($500 million). According to the original plan, the Turkish Navy wanted a slightly shorter flight deck without the ski-jump ramp in front, to be optimized for use with only helicopters.

The Turkish Navy later changed its plan and opted for a fully equipped flight deck with the ski-jump ramp in front, after deciding to purchase 32 F-35B STOVL aircraft. Turkey was a Level 3 partner in the Joint Strike Fighter program that led to the F-35 Lightning II. The Turkish Air Force was intending to get the F-35A CTOL version, until the U.S. Senate blocked the export of the fighter jet to Turkey due to its purchase of the S-400 missile system from Russia, which is subjected to CAATSA sanctions. Instead of the F-35B STOVL version, in the short term the Turkish Navy will operate domestically-produced UCAVs such as the Bayraktar TB3 and Bayraktar Kızılelma.

According to the official specifications, Anadolu will be capable of operating up to 10 F-35Bs, if Turkey purchases the aircraft in the future, and 12 medium-sized helicopters in the "V/STOL aircraft carrier" configuration.

The dimensions of the final design are 231 meters (757 ft 10 in) in length, a 32-meter (105 ft 0 in) beam, a 6.8-meter (22 ft 4 in) draft, and 58 meters (190 ft 3 in) in height. Her displacement is 24,660 tons in "V/STOL aircraft carrier" mission configuration, or 27,079 tons in "amphibious assault ship" mission configuration. Her maximum speed is 21.5 knots (39.8 km/h; 24.7 mph) in "STOVL aircraft carrier" configuration, or 29 knots (54 km/h; 33 mph) in "amphibious assault ship" configuration. Her maximum range is 9,000 nautical miles (17,000 km; 10,000 mi) at an economical speed.

==== Amphibious assault ship configuration ====
The ship has a 1,880 m^{2} (20,200 sq ft) light cargo garage for TEU containers and 27 Amphibious Assault Vehicles (AAV); a 1,165 m^{2} (12,540 sq ft) dock which can host four Landing Craft Mechanized (LCM) or two Landing Craft Air Cushion (LCAC), or two Landing Craft Vehicle Personnel (LCVP); and a 1,410 m^{2} (15,200 sq ft) garage for heavy loads, which can host 29 main battle tanks (MBT), Amphibious Assault Vehicles, and TEU containers. The ship is protected by the ARAS-2023 diver detection sonar (DDS). She has a crew of 261 personnel: 30 officers, 49 NCOs, 59 leading seamen, and 123 ratings.

==== V/STOL aircraft carrier configuration ====
The ship has a 5,440 m^{2} (58,600 sq ft) flight deck and a 990 m^{2} (10,700 sq ft) aviation hangar which can accommodate either 12 medium-sized helicopters or 8 Boeing CH-47F Chinook heavy-lift helicopters. When the aviation hangar and the light cargo garage are unified, the ship can carry up to 25 medium-sized helicopters. Alternatively, the ship can carry up to 10 F-35B STOVL fighter jets and 12 medium-sized helicopters, with the possibility of hosting six more helicopters on the flight deck of the ship.

==== Aircraft types ====
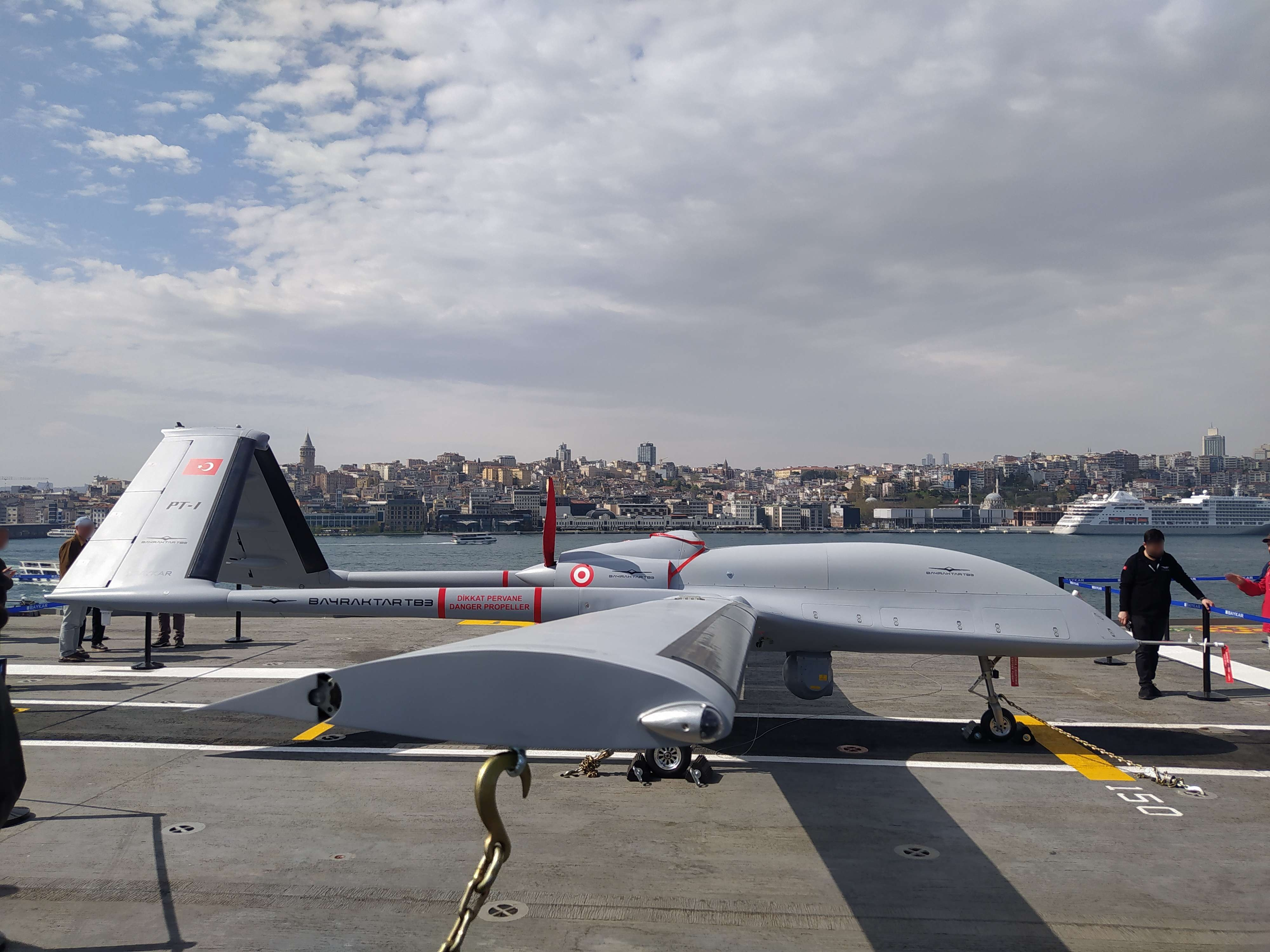
Baykar Bayraktar TB3 UCAV on the flight deck of TCG Anadolu

The S-70B-28 Seahawk and the AH-1W Super Cobra are the two main types of helicopters that are used on TCG Anadolu, with the occasional use of the Boeing CH-47F Chinook helicopters in the inventory of the Turkish Army during military exercises and operations. The AH-1W Super Cobra helicopters will eventually be complemented and replaced by the TAI T929 ATAK 2.

The MALE Bayraktar TB3 and the jet-powered, low-observable Bayraktar Kızılelma are the two UCAVs that are specifically designed and manufactured to be used on TCG Anadolu.

On 19 November 2024, Baykar Bayraktar TB3 UCAV successfully took-off from the flight deck of TCG Anadolu and landed on the ship. It was the first time a fixed-wing unmanned aircraft of this size and class had successfully landed on a short-runway landing helicopter dock, without the use of an arresting gear.

=== Construction and commissioning ===
The final contract for the construction of the ship was signed with the Navantia-Sedef consortium on 7 May 2015. The commissioning of the ship was initially scheduled for 2021, and the estimated cost of the ship according to the final specifications was declared as $1 billion in 2015. The construction works began on 30 April 2016 at the shipyard of Sedef Shipbuilding Inc. in Istanbul.

On the evening of 29 April 2019, a small fire broke out in the forward area as some isolation material caught fire when welding was done nearby whilst in dry dock, but the fire was quickly extinguished and the minor damage on the coating paint (stains of smoke and flames) was subsequently repaired with a fresh repainting.

On 27 February 2022, the sea trials of Anadolu began. TCG Anadolu was commissioned with a ceremony, attended by President Erdoğan, on 10 April 2023.

==== TCG Trakya (L-401) ====
According to media reports in 2019, the construction of a sister ship, to be named TCG Trakya (L-401), was being planned by the Turkish Navy. However, the Turkish Navy gave priority to the construction of the indigenously-designed MUGEM-class aircraft carrier, which began on 2 January 2025. The first MUGEM-class aircraft carrier is being built at the Istanbul Naval Shipyard.

=== Ships in the class ===
Pennant no.	Name	Namesake	Builder	Launched	Commissioned	Status	Note
L-400	TCG Anadolu	Anatolia	Sedef Shipyard	30 April 2019	10 April 2023	In service	
L-401	TCG Trakya	Thrace				Planned	

== Operational history ==
On 18 February 2026, the Bayraktar TB3 successfully performed a flight demonstration from the TCG Anadolu in the Baltic region during NATO's Steadfast Dart 2026 exercise. The drone operated effectively in strong winds, freezing temperatures and heavy snowfall. The drone also successfully hit surface targets at sea with two MAM-L precision-guided munitions. After this, the Bayraktar TB3 also completed an eight-hour joint sortie with multiple Eurofighter Typhoon fighters of the German Air Force in Baltic Sea during the exercise. During this exercise with the Eurofighter Typhoons, the Bayraktar TB-3 was covered 1,700 kilometers on its mission. The drone also captured aerial video of the Eurofighter Typhoon using its ASELFLIR 500 electro-optical reconnaissance, surveillance and targeting system made by the Turkish company Aselsan. This mission marked a significant integration of unmanned aerial vehicles with advanced fighter jets in a multinational drill with performing manned-unmanned teaming. The operation demonstrated the drone carrier TCG Anadolu's capability to operate effectively within high-intensity long-range alliance maneuvers.

== See also ==
- List of aircraft carriers in service

Ships built with the same hull and platform design

- Juan Carlos I class
- Canberra class

Equivalent amphibious assault ships of the same era

- Trieste class
- America class
- Type 075
- Project 23900
