= MV Karadeniz Powership Yasin Bey =

Powership

Karadeniz Powership Yasin Bey
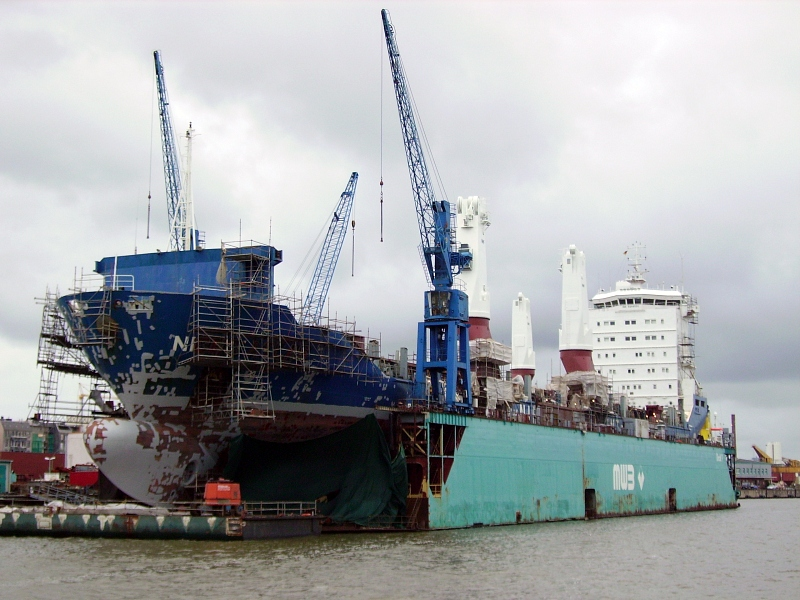
- Nirint Atlas drydocked in 2007, prior to her conversion to a power ship

History

- Name: KPS Yasin Bey; HR Intonation (2011–2016); Beluga Intonation (2007–2011); Nirint Atlas (2007); Beluga Intonation (2006–2007); Nirint Atlas (2005–2006); Beluga Intonation (2004–2005); Nirint Atlas (2003–2004); TMC Atlas (2002–2003); Atlas (2002); Industrial Atlas (2001–2002); CEC Atlas (2000–2001)
- Owner: Karpowership
- Operator: Karpowership
- Builder: Dalian Shipbuilding Industry Company, Dalian, Liaoning, China
- Completed: 2000
- Homeport: Monrovia
- Identification: Call sign: D5BY8, IMO number: 9214551, MMSI number: 636092418

General characteristics
- Class & type: Special Service-Floating Power Plant; formerly Bulk cargo
- Tonnage: 11,130 GT; 11,872 DWT
- Length: 162.15 m (532 ft 0 in) (LOA)
- Beam: 20.73 m (68 ft 0 in)
- Capacity: 125 MW generation (as Powership)

MV Karadeniz Powership Yasin Bey is Liberia-flagged floating power plant, owned and operated by Karpowership. In 2016, she was solemnly sent off from the Sedef Shipyard in Tuzla, Istanbul, Turkey together with the MV Karadeniz Powership Gökhan Bey to Indonesia to supply electricity to the power grid.

== Cargo ship ==
The ship was built in 2000 as a general cargo carrier by Dalian Shipbuilding Industry Company in Dalian, Liaoning, China. The 162.15 m (532 ft 0 in) long vessel has a beam of 20.73 m (68 ft 0 in). By 11,872 DWT, she has a cargo capacity of 11,130 GT.

== Powership ==
The Turkish company Karpowership purchased the general cargo ship. She was converted into a Powership at Sedef Shipyard in Tuzla, Istanbul, and renamed MV Karadeniz Powership Yasin Bey with a generation capacity of 125 MW.

On November 13, 2016, the Powership sailed to Ambon, Indonesia in a ceremony attended by the President Recep Tayyip Erdoğan, Prime Minister Binali Yıldırım, Minister of Transport, Maritime and Communication Ahmet Arslan and other officials. She was commissioned to supply electricity to the power grid on Ambon for five years.
