= MV Karadeniz Powership Zeynep Sultan =

Liberia-flagged powership

Karadeniz Powership Zeynep Sultan
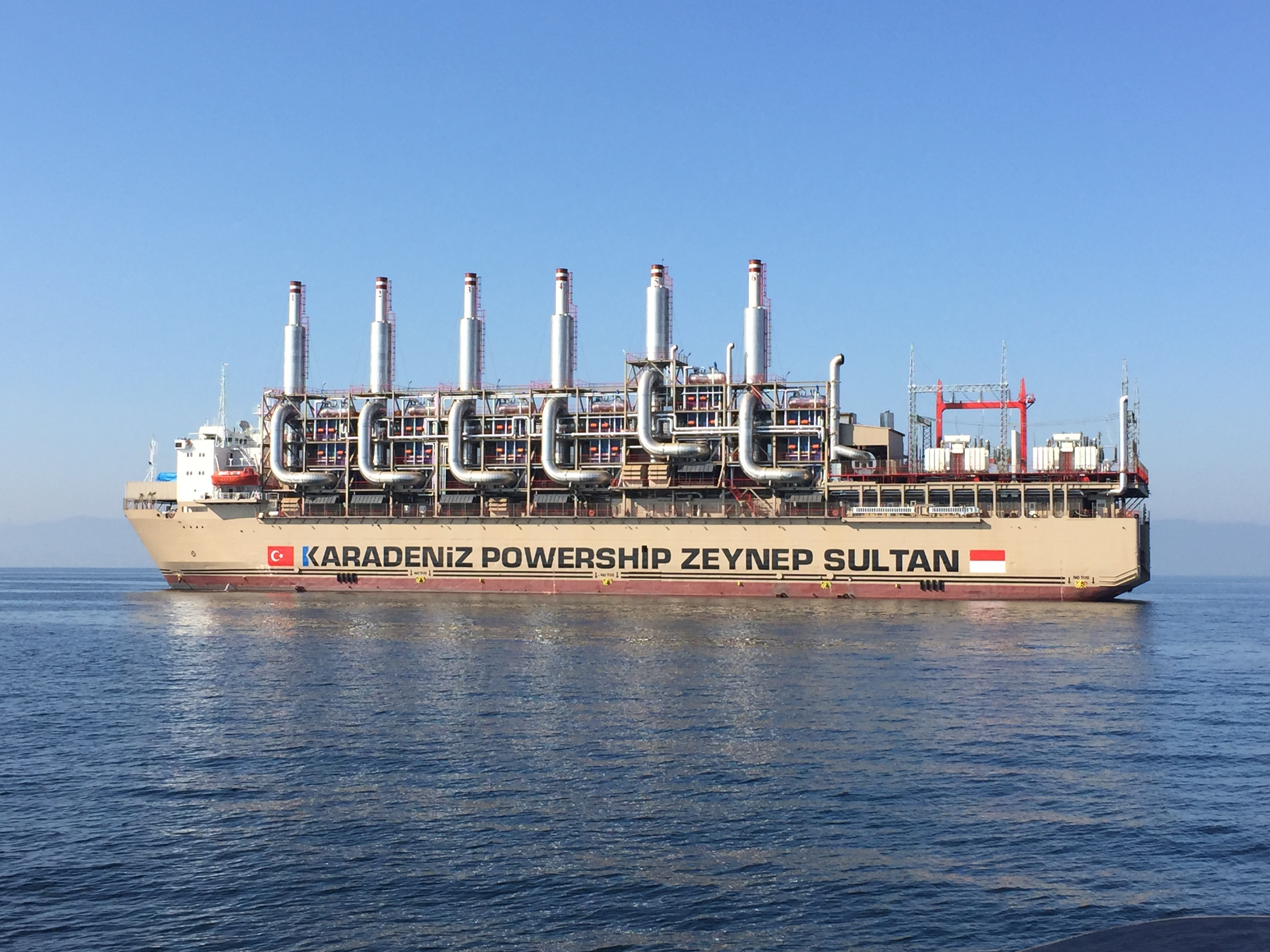
- Karadeniz Powership Zeynep Sultan

History

- Name: KPS Zeynep Sultan (2011– ); Explorer (2003–11); Smit Explorer (1999–03); Pavel Antokolsky (1984–99)
- Owner: Karpowership (2011– ); Dockwise Shipping, Breda, Netherlands (2003–11); Navigo Management Company Ltd., Limassol, Cyprus (2001–03); Navigo Management Company Ltd., Singapore (2000–01); Smit Transport & Heavy Lift B.V., Rotterdam, Netherlands (1999–00); Ukrainian Danube Shipping Co., Izmail, Ukraine (1984–99)
- Operator: Karpowership
- Port of registry: Willemstad, Curaçao (2010–11); Willemstad, Netherlands Antilles (2003–10); (The Bahamas) Nassau, Bahamas (2001–03); Singapore (2000–01); Valletta, Malta (1999–00); Izmail, Ukraine (1992–99); (Ukrainian Soviet Socialist Republic) Izmail, Ukrainian SSR (1984–92)
- Builder: Valmet Oy Vuosaari shipyard, Helsinki, Finland
- Yard number: 315
- Launched: 28 April 1984
- Completed: September 1984
- Homeport: Monrovia, Liberia
- Identification: IMO number: 8116051; MMSI number: 36015325; Callsign: A8ZZ9

General characteristics
- Class & type: Special Service-Floating Power Plant<; formerly Barge carrier
- Tonnage: 19,453 GT; 8,638 DWT
- Length: 158.90 m (521 ft 4 in) (LOA)
- Beam: 30.31 m (99 ft 5 in)
- Draught: 4.94 m (16 ft 2 in)
- Depth: 15.45 m (50 ft 8 in)
- Installed power: 7,559 hp (5,637 kW)
- Propulsion: 2x 9cyl Wärtsilä Type 9R32 (230x310) diesel engines; 2x propellers
- Speed: 13.5 knots (25.0 km/h; 15.5 mph)
- Capacity: 125 MW generation (as Powership)

The MV Karadeniz Powership Zeynep Sultan is a Liberia-flagged powership, a floating power plant, owned and operated by Karpowership. Built in 1984 by the Valmet Oy Helsingin Telakka in Vuosaari, Helsinki, Finland and christened MV Pavel Antokolsky, she sailed as a barge carrier under various names and flags until in 2015 she was converted into a Powership at the Sedef Shipyard in Tuzla, Istanbul, Turkey. She is commissioned to supply electricity to the power grid in Amurang, North Sulawesi, Indonesia.

== Barge carrier ==
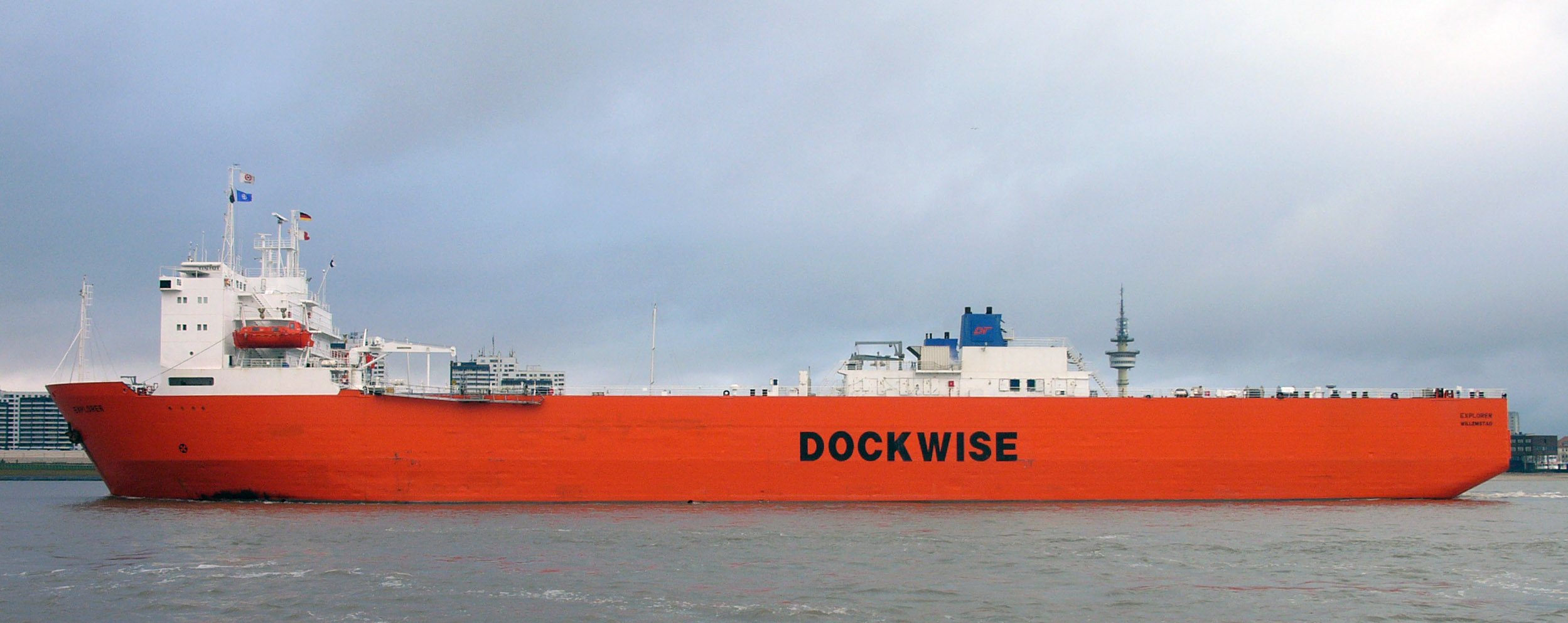
Dutch barge carrier MV Explorer of Dockwise Shipping spotted April 2009 in Bremerhaven, Germany.

She was built by the Valmet Oy Vuosaari shipyard in Helsinki, Finland with yard number 315 as a barge carrier (LASH carrier) in September 1984. The 158.9 m (521 ft 4 in) (LOA) long vessel has a beam of 30.3 m (99 ft 5 in), a depth of 15.5 m (50 ft 10 in) and a draft of 4.9 m (16 ft 1 in) registered. Two four-stroke diesel engines with nine single-acting cylinders of Type 9R32 (230x310) manufactured by the Finnish Wärtsilä Diesel Oy give a total of 7,559 hp (5,637 kW) on two screws propelling the vessel at 13.5 knots (25.0 km/h; 15.5 mph). By 8,638 DWT tonnage, she has a cargo capacity of 19,453 GT.

She saw service under the names Pavel Antokolsky, Smit Explorer and Explorer before she was sold in 2011 to Karpowership.

== Powership ==
The originally barge carrier was converted into a Powership at the Sedef Shipyard in Tuzla, Istanbul. She was renamed Karadeniz Powership Zeynep Sultan (KPS11). The construction cost was partly financed by a credit in amount of US$75 million shared by the German Investment Corp. (DEG), Netherlands Development Finance Co. (FMO) and Cordiant Capital Inc./ICF International. She has a generation capacity of 125 MW on dual-fuel (HFO- and gas-fired). The vessel is registered under the Liberian flag with homeport Monrovia.

On 27 October 2015, the Powership set sail to Jakarta, Indonesia departing from Istanbul following a farewell ceremony, at which another Powership of the fleet, the KPS7 – Karadeniz Powership Ayşegül Sultan, weighed anchor to head to Ghana. Karadeniz Powership Zeynep Sultan arrived to Jakarta by the end of November 2015, and sailed to Amurang, where she is helping to resolve the perennial power cuts in North Sulawesi.

== Ship's registry ==
- ex-MV Pavel Antokolsky owned by Ukrainian Danube Shipping Co. based in Izmail, Ukraine registered in the Ukrainian SSR with homeport Izmail until January 1992 and in Ukraine with homeport Izmail until 14 June 1992,
- ex-MV Smit Explorer owned by Smit Transport & Heavy Lift B.V. based in Rotterdam, Netherlands registered in Malta with homeport Valletta until 2000, and owned by Navigo Management Co. Ltd. based in Singapore registered in Singapore with homeport Singapore until 23 January 2001, and owned by Navigo Management Co. Ltd. based in Limassol, Cyprus registered in the Bahamas with homeport Nassau until 16 December 2003,
- ex-MV Explorer owned by Dockwise Shipping based in Breda, Netherlands registered in the Netherlands Antilles with homeport Willemstad until 10 October 2010 and registered in Curaçao with homeport Willemstad until April 2011.
