= Karadeniz =

Karadeniz is the Turkish name for the Black Sea, also used as a surname. It may refer to:

== People ==
- Ali Karadeniz, or Michael Wright (basketball), American-Turkish basketball player
- Barış Karadeniz, Turkish politician
- Batuhan Karadeniz, Turkish football player
- Gökdeniz Karadeniz, Turkish football player
- Gökhan Karadeniz, Turkish footballer
- Harun Karadeniz (1942–1975), Turkish social reformer and writer
- Merve Karadeniz, Turkish female freestyle wrestler
- Süleyman Karadeniz, Turkish freestyle wrestler

== Other ==
- Karadeniz Holding, a Turkish conglomerate
- Karadeniz Technical University, a university in Trabzon
- Karadeniz TV, a Turkish TV channel with a sister radio station, Karadeniz FM
- SS Karadeniz, a Turkish cruise liner, which was used as a travelling exhiibition vessel in 1926.
- TCG Karadeniz (F 255), ex-USS Donald B. Beary, a Knox-class frigate acquired in 1994 and decommissioned in 2006
- TCG Karadeniz (F 520), an Istanbul-class frigate under construction
