= MV Karadeniz Powership Onur Sultan =

Floating power plant

Karadeniz Powership Onur Sultan
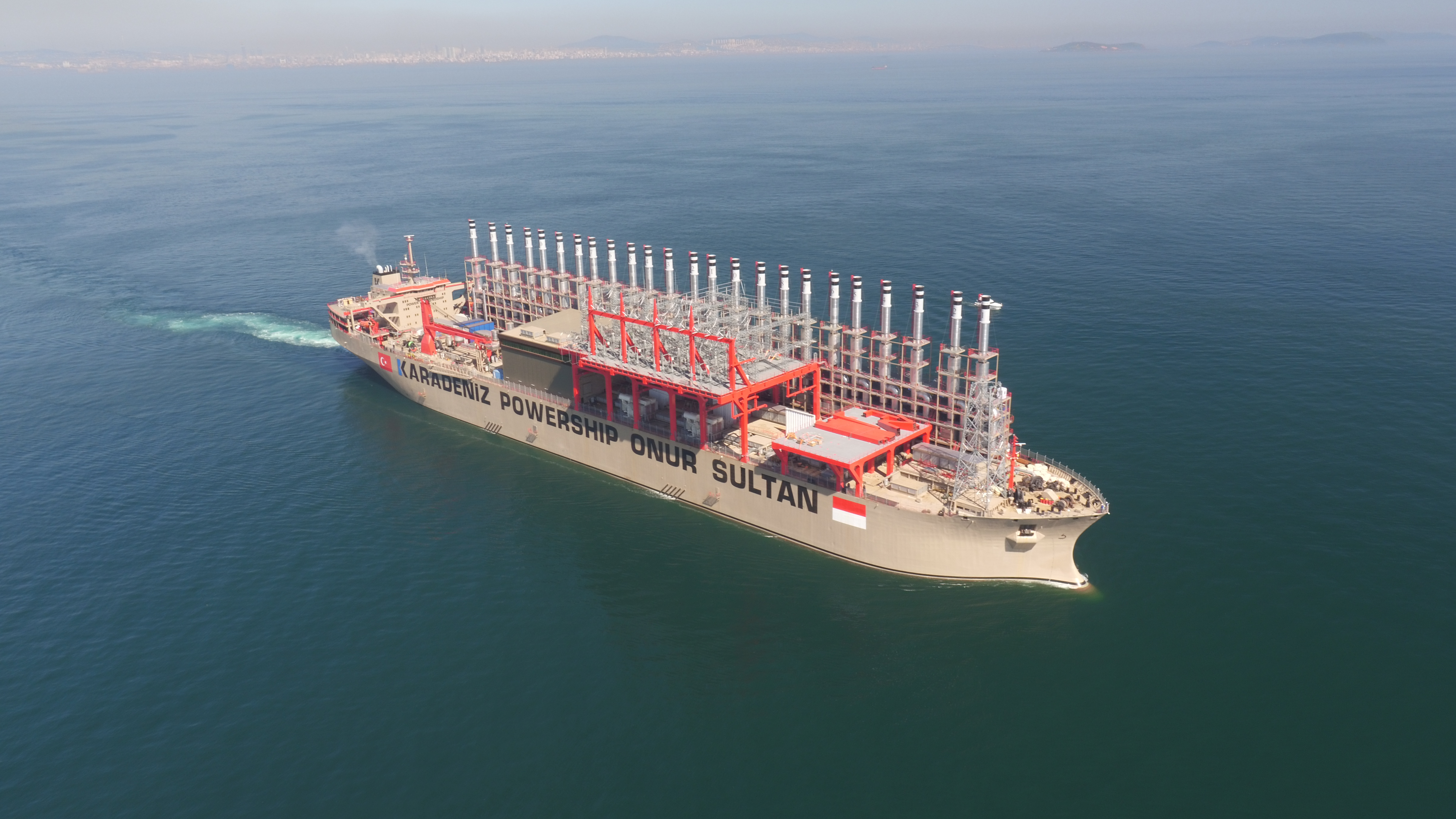
- Karadeniz Powership Onur Sultan

History

Liberia
- Name: KPS Onur Sultan; Nisshin Trader; Lowlands Trader
- Owner: Karpowership
- Operator: Karpowership
- Builder: JMU TSU Shipyard in Tsu, Mie, Japan
- Yard number: 211
- Laid down: 12 February 2001
- Launched: 17 April 2001
- Completed: 26 July 2001
- Identification: Call sign: D5KH5, IMO number: 9047441, MMSI number: 636016953

General characteristics
- Class & type: Special Service-Floating Power Plant; formerly bulk cargo
- Tonnage: 87,390 GT; 172,517 DWT
- Length: 289 m (948 ft 2 in) (LOA)
- Beam: 45 m (147 ft 8 in)
- Draught: 5.90 m (19.4 ft)
- Speed: 9.1 knots (16.9 km/h; 10.5 mph) (max), 7.1 knots (13.1 km/h; 8.2 mph) (avg)
- Capacity: 470 MW (as powership)

The MV Karadeniz Powership Onur Sultan is a Liberia-flagged floating power plant, owned and operated by Karpowership. In 2016, she was sent off from the Sedef Shipyard in Tuzla, Istanbul, Turkey to Myanmar to supply electricity to the power grid. In 2018, she was commissioned to supply electricity to the power grid in Indonesia.

== Cargo ship ==
The ship was laid down on 12 February 2001, launched on April 17i and completed on 26 July the same year. She was built as a bulk carrier by JMU TSU Shipyard in Tsu, Mie, Japan with yard number 211. The 289-metre-long (948 ft 2 in) vessel has a beam of 45 m (147 ft 8 in) and a draft of 5.90 m (19 ft 4 in). By 172,517 DWT, she has a cargo capacity of 87,390 GT. She has an average speed of 6.9 knots (12.8 km/h; 7.9 mph) at max. 8.5 knots (15.7 km/h; 9.8 mph).

She sailed under the name MV Lowlands Trader and Panama flag until December 2005. Renamed MV Nisshin Trader, she sailed under the Philippines flag for the Tokyo-based Nisshin Shipping Co. Ltd. On 11 November 2015, she was purchased by the Turkish company Karpowership for US$9.3 million.

== Powership ==
She was converted into a powership at Sedef Shipyard in Tuzla, Istanbul, and renamed MV Karadeniz Powership Onur Sultan. On 13 November 2016, the Powership sailed to Myanmar in a ceremony attended by the President Recep Tayyip Erdoğan, Prime Minister Binali Yıldırım, Minister of Transport, Maritime and Communication Ahmet Arslan and other officials. She was commissioned to supply electricity to the power grid in Myanmar. In 2018, she started supplying electricity to Indonesia.

== Ship's registry ==
- ex-MV Nisshin Trader, Philippines-flagged, owned by Nisshin Shipping Co Ltd, Japan (2005–2015)
- ex-MV Lowlands Trader, Panama-flagged (2001–2005)
