= MV Karadeniz Powership Rauf Bey =

Karadeniz Powership Rauf Bey
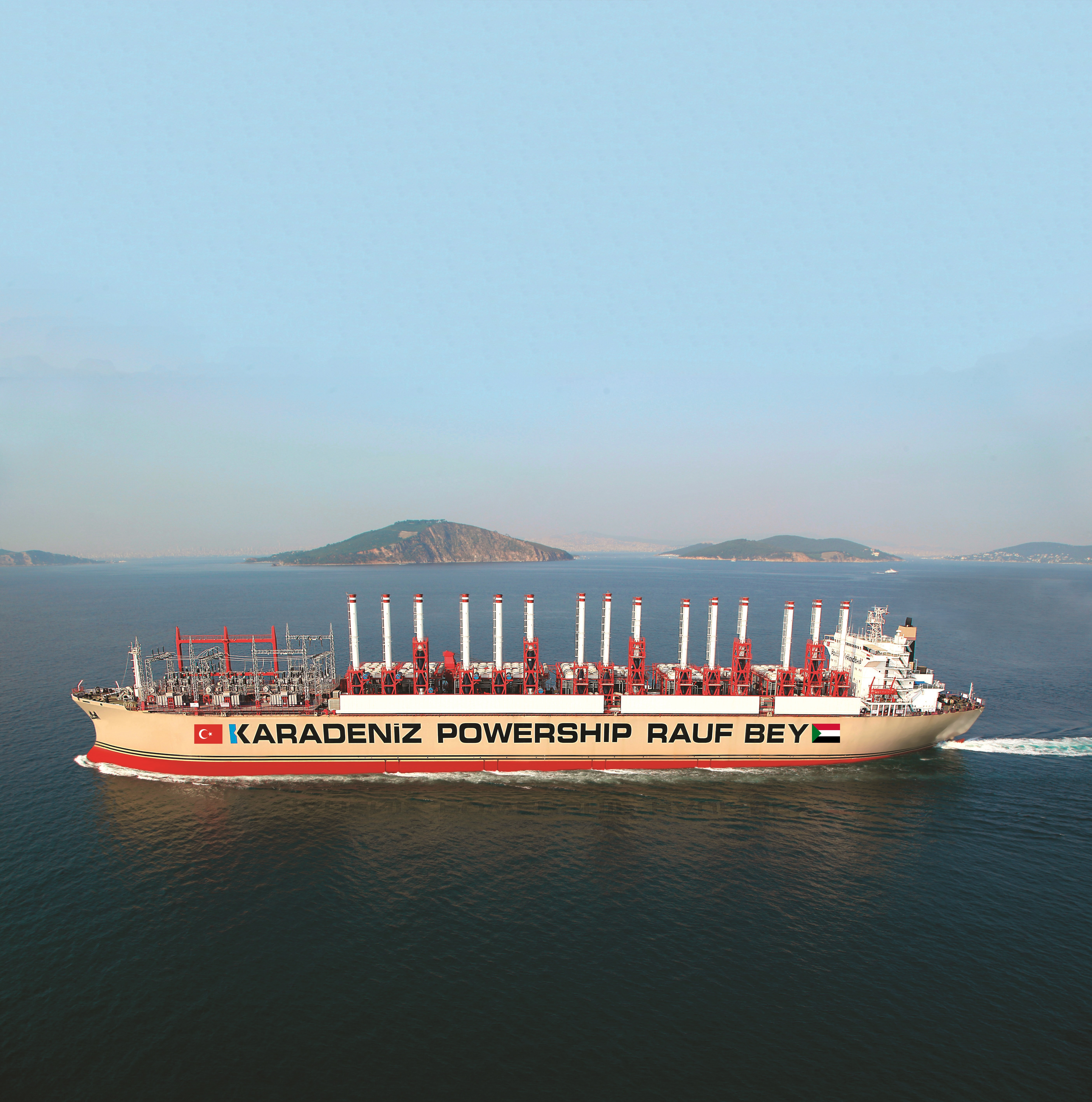
- Karadeniz Powership Rauf Bey

History

Liberia
- Name: Rauf Bey (2009– ); Agios Raphael (2001–09); El Pampero (1991–01); Gulf Grain (1982–91)
- Owner: Karpowership (2009– )
- Operator: Karpowership
- Builder: Ishibras Shipyard, Verolme Estaleiros Reunidos do Brasil, Angra dos Reis, Brazil
- Completed: November 1982
- Homeport: Monrovia, Liberia
- Identification: IMO number: 7925522; MMSI number: 636014325; Callsign: A8TB9

General characteristics
- Class & type: Special Service-Floating Power Plant; formerly Bulk cargo
- Tonnage: 41,449 GT; 75,485 DWT
- Length: 241.89 m (793 ft 7 in) (LOA)
- Beam: 32.20 m (105 ft 8 in)
- Draught: 6.50 m (21 ft 4 in)
- Installed power: 17,960 hp (13,390 kW)
- Propulsion: 8-cylinder diesel engines of Type K8 SZ 70/150CL manufactured by Mecânica Pesada Sao Paulo, Brazil
- Speed: 14.0 knots (25.9 km/h; 16.1 mph)
- Capacity: 179 MW generation (as Powership)

MV Karadeniz Powership Rauf Bey is a Liberia-flagged Powership, a floating power plant, owned and operated by Karpowership. Built in 1982 in Brazil and christened MV Gulf Grain, she sailed as a bulk carrier under various names and flags until she was acquired to be converted 2009 into a Powership in Turkey. She served in Basra, Iraq supplying electricity to the power grid there. Currently, she supplies electricity to Sudan.

== Cargo ship ==
She was built by the Ishibras Shipyard of Verolme Estaleiros Reunidos do Brasil at Angra dos Reis, Brazil as a bulk carrier in November 1982. The 241.89 m (793 ft 7 in) (LOA) long vessel has a beam of 32.20 m (105 ft 8 in) and a draft of 6.50 m (21 ft 4 in). The eight-cylinder diesel engines of Type K8 SZ 70/150CL manufactured by Mecânica Pesada Sao Paulo in Brazil give a total power of 17,960 hp (13,390 kW) propelling the vessel at 14.0 knots (25.9 km/h; 16.1 mph). By 75,485 DWT, she has a cargo capacity of 41,449 GT.

She saw service under the names Gulf Grain, El Pampero and Agios Raphael before she was sold in June 2009 to Karpowership.

== Powership ==
The originally bulk carrier was converted into a Powership and renamed Karadeniz Powership Rauf Bey. The vessel is registered under the Liberian flag with homeport Monrovia.

In August 2010, the Powership with 179 MW generation power set sail to Basra, Iraq to bridge electricity shortage for about one million people in and around Az Zubayr. At that time, she was considered as the "biggest Powership of the world". Another Powership of the fleet, the MV Karadeniz Powership Doğan Bey, has been already serving with 126 MW in the same region of Iraq.

In April 2018, Karpowership signed a contract with Sudanese Thermal Power Generating Company (STPGC) to supply 150 MW to Sudan for 12 months.

== Ship's registry ==
- ex-MV Gulf Grain until July 1991,
- ex-MV El Pampero owned by Navemar S.A. of Argentina and registered in the Bahamas with homeport Nassau until July 2001,
- ex-MV Agios Raphael owned in Cyprus and registered in Panama until June 2009.
