= MV Karadeniz Powership Osman Khan =

Floating power plant

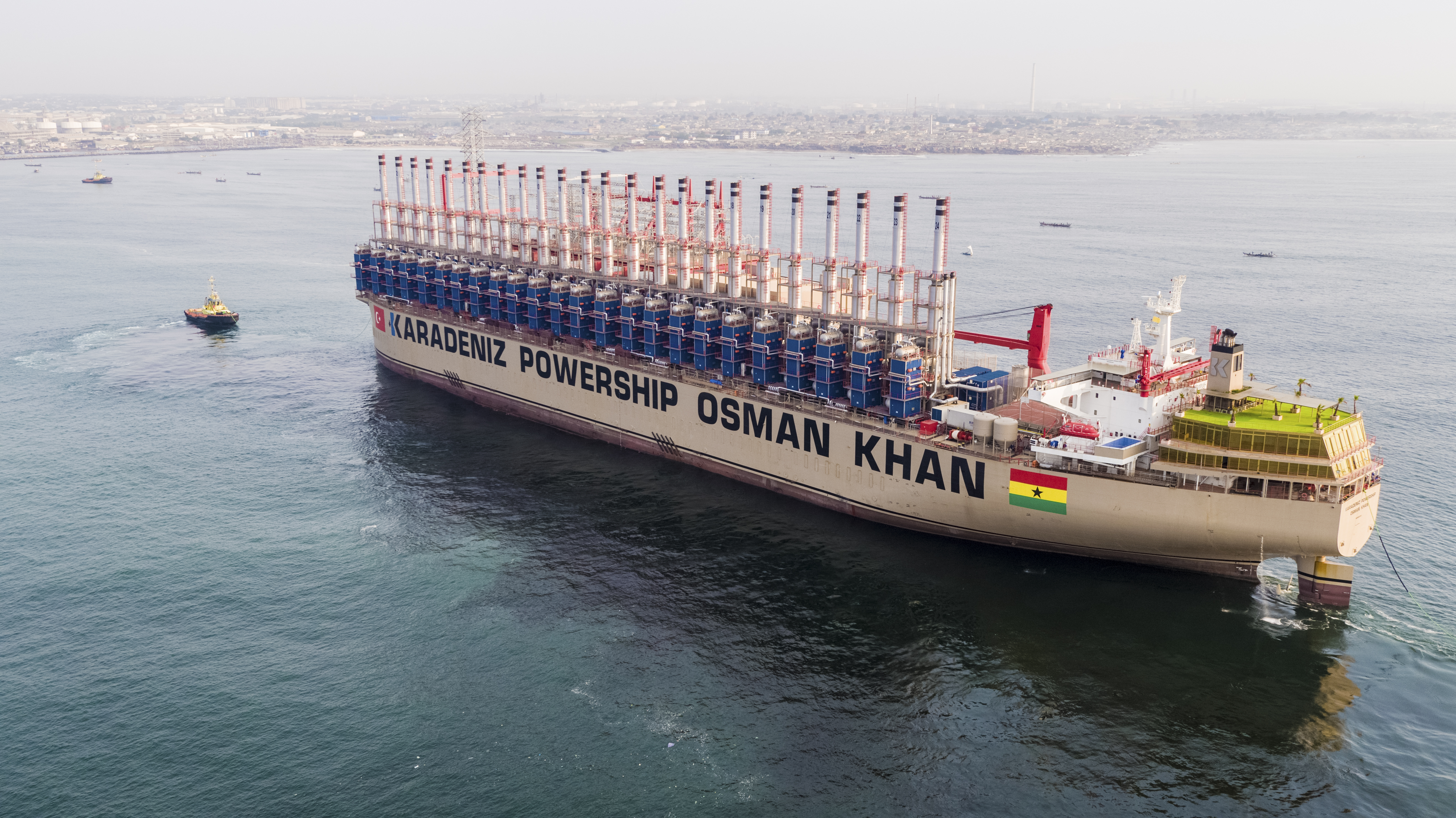

History

Liberia
- Name: KPS Osman Khan
- Owner: Karpowership
- Operator: Karpowership
- Port of registry: Monrovia
- Builder: Samsung Shipbuilding, Geoje, South Korea
- Completed: 2000
- Identification: Call sign: ELXS8, IMO number: 9189158, MMSI number: 636011235

General characteristics
- Class & type: Special Service-Floating Power Plant; formerly Bulk cargo
- Tonnage: 100,330 GT; 184,744 DWT
- Length: 299 m (981 ft 0 in) (LOA)
- Beam: 50 m (164 ft 1 in)
- Draught: 10.71 m (35.1 ft)
- Speed: 8.5 knots (15.7 km/h; 9.8 mph) (max), 6.9 knots (12.8 km/h; 7.9 mph) (avg)
- Capacity: 470 MW generation (as Powership)

MV Karadeniz Powership Osman Khan is a Liberia-flagged floating power plant owned and operated by Karpowership. In 2016, she was launched from the Hat-San Shipyard in Altinova, Yalova, Turkey, marking the beginning of her mission to supply electricity to the Ghana power grid.

== Cargo ship ==
The ship was built in 2000 as a bulk carrier by Samsung Shipbuilding in Geoje, South Korea. The 299 m (981 ft 0 in) long vessel has a beam of 50 m (164 ft 1 in) and a draft of 10.7 m (35 ft 1 in). By 184,744 DWT, she has a cargo capacity of 100,330 GT. She has an average speed of 6.9 knots (12.8 km/h; 7.9 mph) at max. 8.5 knots (15.7 km/h; 9.8 mph).

The vessel was owned by the Australian company Teekay Shipping Australia in Sydney.

== Powership ==
The Turkish company Karadeniz Holding purchased the vessel MV Pacific Triangle at the end of 2014 for US$17 million from Teekay Shipping. The bulk carrier was converted into a Powership with a generation capacity of 470 MW at Hat-San Shipyard in Altinova, Yalova. On November 13, 2016, the Powership, renamed MV Karadeniz Powership Osman Khan, sailed to Ghana in a ceremony attended by the President Recep Tayyip Erdoğan, Prime Minister Binali Yıldırım, Minister of Transport, Maritime and Communication Ahmet Arslan and other officials. She was commissioned to supply electricity to the power grid in Ghana. She is the world's biggest Powership.

== Ship's registry ==
- ex-MV Pacific Triangle, Liberia-flagged, owned by Teekay Shipping Australia in Sydney, Australia.

== See also ==
- List of power stations in Ghana
- Electricity sector in Ghana
