= Karpowership =

Turkish powership manufacturer

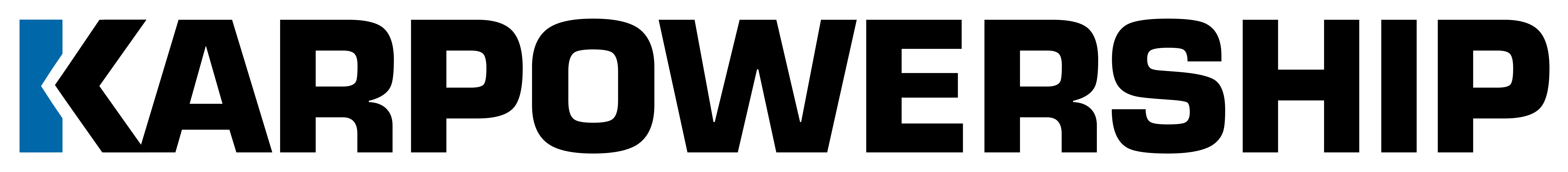
- Type: Private
- Industry: Energy, Powership
- Headquarters: Istanbul, Turkey
- Area served: Worldwide
- Key people: Orhan Karadeniz (CEO); Osman Karadeniz (Chairman)
- Parent: Karadeniz Holding
- Website: www.karpowership.com

Karpowership is a Turkish multinational power generation company that develops and operates floating power plants, as well as onshore energy projects and related infrastructure.

The company is the owner, operator, and builder of a fleet of powerships, comprising more than 45 assets and generating power across four continents, with a total installed capacity exceeding 8,000 MW.

Karpowership constructs its floating plants at its shipyard Karmarine in Yalova, Türkiye and executes all its activities in-house, including design, construction, site preparation, commissioning, fuel supply and electricity delivery.

== History ==
Karpowership serves as the international energy generation brand of Karadeniz Holding, through which the company operates its fleet of floating power plants in various countries.

In 2007, Karpowership developed a project named "Power of Friendship", which supplies electricity to shortage-stricken countries in the Middle East, Africa and Asia.

In December 2008, Karpowership signed a contract with the Ministry of Electricity of Iraq (MoE) to deploy three Powerships of 520 MW in total. In 2010, the first Powership project was launched in Iraq. Between 2010 and 2016, Karpowership supplied electricity to Basra through four Powerships in three different locations.

In June 2012, Karpowership signed a contract with the Lebanese Electricity Utility (EDL) to deploy two Powerships with almost 400 MW capacity in total. Karpowership was operational in Lebanon and supplied 25% of the country's total electricity demand.

Between 2016 and 2018, the company supplied cross-border power to Zambia via a 110 MW Powership moored at the Port of Nacala in northern Mozambique.

Between 2016 and 2021, Karpowership supplied electricity in Indonesia. The company was awarded a 540 MW tender by the state utility PT PLN (Persero) to supply electricity to 5 different islands of the Indonesian Archipelago.

The company entered into African market with a 450 MW project in Ghana in 2014, and continued to grow in Africa with Mozambique, the Gambia, Sierra Leone and Sudan in 2018, Guinea Bissau, Senegal & Guinea Conakry in 2019, Côte D’Ivoire in 2022 and Gabon in 2024.

The company also has Powership operations in Brazil, Dominican Republic, Ecuador, New Caledonia and Guyana.

== Powership ==
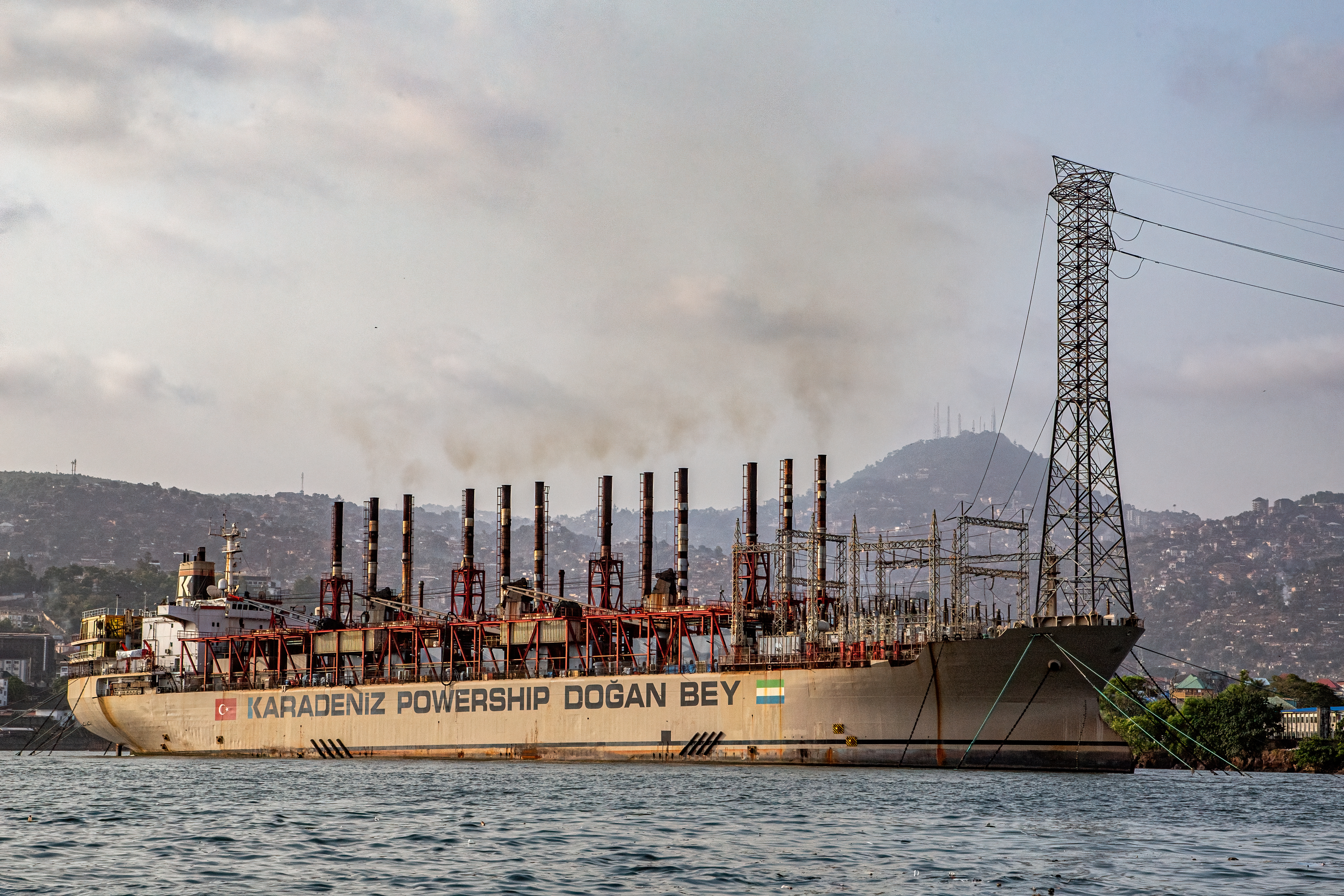
MV Karadeniz Powership Doğan Bey in Freetown, Sierra Leone (2024)

Powerships are barge- or ship-mounted floating power plants that can operate on liquid fuels and/or natural gas. Karpowership's powerships are available under electricity-generation services contracts, power-rental contracts, energy-conversion works contracts or power-purchase agreements.

The freighter Melpomeni was acquired in 2009 by Karpowership with the purpose to turn her into a floating power plant sailing under the Liberian flag. She was renamed Karadeniz Powership Doğan Bey after Nuri Doğan Karadeniz, the COO of the company.

In May 2009, the Sedef Shipyard in Tuzla, Istanbul, was commissioned with the task to convert a cargo ship into a Powership by installing the needed engine generators, transformers, and the electric switchboards on board.

Karadeniz Powership Doğan Bey is the first of its kind, a Powership with dual-fuel diesel engines capable of operating on natural gas as well. Aboard the vessel, twelve 10.53 MW generator units are installed. Three units are present in each one of the ship's four holds, with the fans and funnels being mounted on deck.

Bureau Veritas, an international certification agency with experience in overseeing both shipbuilding and power plant development, classified the vessel following its conversion as a "special service-floating power plant".

In 2024, Karpowership launched Africa’s first LNG-to-power project in Senegal, supplying gas to a floating power plant via a floating storage and regasification unit (FSRU).

In August 2025, Karpowership, through its subsidiary BKPS, signed an agreement with Iraq’s Ministry of Electricity to provide up to 590 MW of electricity using two powerships stationed at ports in Basra.

=== Operations ===
Karpowership has offices and is operational in Africa, Americas, Asia, Europe and the Middle East. Karpowership's International Projects operate out of Istanbul, from where they can supply floating power plants to overseas locations.

==== Ghana ====
Karpowership signed a Power Purchase Agreement (PPA) with the Electricity Company of Ghana (ECG) in June 2014 to supply a total of 450MW of power with two Powerships to the people of Ghana. The first 225MW Powership was delivered in 2015. In 2016, the PPA was consolidated into one single 450MW Powership, and in August 2017, Karpowership deployed a 470MW Powership, the largest in the world, to Ghana. It began operations in September 2017, a month after its arrival.

==== Brazil ====
In May 2024, Karpowership signed an agreement with Brazil's state-owned energy company Petrobras to develop natural gas projects in the Americas. The company has been active in Brazil, supplying floating power solutions to support the country's energy infrastructure.

==== South Africa ====
In April 2021, the Department of Mineral Resources and Energy in South Africa entered into a 20-year power supply agreement with Karpowership to address the ongoing energy crisis. Under this agreement, South Africa's Risk Mitigation IPP Procurement Programme (RMIPPPP) is set to receive the bulk of 1845 MW in new energy capacity through a total of five powerships and three gas ships at three South African harbours (Ngqura, Durban and Saldanha Bay). Energy Department says 20-year contracts for floating powerships will keep prices down. On 1 August 2022, the Minister of Forestry, Fisheries and the Environment denied the appeal by the South African subsidiary to continue their project to deploy three ships with a total capacity of 1220 MW due to lack of consultation, unconvincing environmental reports and "questioned the need and desirability of the proposed project". The minister has allowed the company 180 days to address gaps and defects in their submission for reconsideration. Minister of Electricity sought to decrease the 20-year contract to a 5-year one as it was revealed heavy fuel oil was also to be used.

In 2023, Karpowership bought and gifted a game farm to Ezemvelo KZN Wildlife in exchange for not objecting to mooring a 450 MW ship-mounted power plant at Richards Bay Harbour.

On 26 February 2023, as one of the last acts as Minister of Transport, Fikile Mbalula granted Karpowership a Section 79 permit; one of two outstanding permits. This came after Karpowership parent company, Karadeniz, broke off an existing agreement with a BEE company and signed a secret MOU to partner with Anna Mokgokong in an attempt to acquire the Section 79 permit. Mokgokong's company Tamasa Investment Holdings was to also build an onshore regasification terminal at the Port of Ngqura and required the Section 79 permit.

=== Ships ===
Name	IMO	Class	MW(E)	Location	Ref
Karadeniz Powership Yurdanur Sultan	N/A	Mermaid	120	Brazil/ Sepetiba	
Karadeniz Powership Osman Bey	N/A	Orca	260	Brazil/ Sepetiba	
Karadeniz Powership Zeynep Sultan	8116051	Shark	120	Brazil/ Sepetiba	
Karadeniz Powership Filiz Sultan	N/A	Mermaid	80	Brazil/ Sepetiba	
Karadeniz Powership Süheyla Sultan	N/A	Orca	240	Dominican Republic / Azua	
Karadeniz Powership İrem Sultan	8222252	Shark	110	Dominican Republic / Azua	
Karadeniz Powership Esra Sultan	N/A	Mermaid	80	Dominican Republic / Azua	
Karadeniz Powership Erin Sultan	N/A	Mermaid	120	Ecuador / Guayaquil	
Karadeniz Powership Emre Bey	9216626	Shark	110	Ecuador / Guayaquil	
Karadeniz Powership Murat Bey	N/A	Mermaid	105	Ecuador / Guayaquil	
Karadeniz Powership Deniz Sultan	N/A	Orca	220	Gabon / Alenakiri	
Karadeniz Powership Goksel Bey	9121845	Seal	40	Gabon / Alenakiri	
Karadeniz Powership Osman Khan	9189158	Khan	470	Ghana / Sekondi-Takoradi	
Karadeniz Powership Kaya Bey	7925546	Shark	230	Guinea Conakry / Conakry	
Karadeniz Powership Yasin Bey	9214551	Shark	130	Guinea Conakry / Conakry	
Karadeniz Powership Barış Bey	9166546	Seal	40	Guyana/ new Amsterdam and Georgetown	
Karadeniz Powership Ela Sultan	N/A	Mermaid	80	Guyana/ new Amsterdam and Georgetown	
Karadeniz Powership Orhan Ali Khan	9248514	Khan	420	Iraq / Basrah	
Karadeniz Powership İbrahim Bey	9216638	Shark	130	Ivory Coast / Abidjan	
Karadeniz Powership Koray Bey	9086203	Seal	40	Ivory Coast / Abidjan	
Karadeniz Powership Nezih Bey	9034781	Seal	40	Mozambique / Nacala	
Karadeniz Powership Orhan Bey	N/A	Orca	210	New Caledonia / Noumea	
Karadeniz Powership Ayşegül Sultan	N/A	Orca	230	Senegal / Dakar	
Karadeniz Powership Gökhan Bey	9214563	Shark	130	Senegal / Dakar	
Karadeniz Powership Doğan Bey	8117031	Shark	130	Sierra Leone / Freetown	
Karadeniz Powership Rauf Bey	7925522	Shark	190	Sudan / Port Sudan	
Karadeniz Powership Ebru Sultan	N/A	Mermaid	90	Sudan / Port Sudan	
Karadeniz Powership Fatmagül Sultan	N/A	Orca	210	Karmarine Shipyard	
Karadeniz Powership Onur Sultan	9047441	Khan	420	Karmarine Shipyard	
Karadeniz Powership Orka Sultan	9198252	Khan	420	Karmarine Shipyard	
Karadeniz Powership Mehmet Bey	9232785	Shark	130	Karmarine Shipyard	
Karadeniz Powership Metin Bey	9034779	Seal	30	Karmarine Shipyard	
Karadeniz Powership Goktay Bey	9034793	Seal	30	Karpower Valley Brownsville	
Karadeniz Powership Cankuthan Bey	9165035	Support		Karmarine Shipyard	
Karadeniz LNGT Powership Americas	9045132	LNG - NWS	0		
Karadeniz Powership Belgin Sultan	9178159	Seal	10	Karmarine Shipyard	
Karadeniz Powership Erol Bey	N/A	Mermaid	70	Karmarine Shipyard	
Karadeniz Powership Ozan Bey	N/A			Karmarine Shipyard	
Karadeniz Powership Arya Deniz Sultan	N/A	Orca		Karmarine Shipyard	
Karadeniz Powership Arda Bey	N/A	Orca		Karmarine Shipyard	
Karadeniz Powership TBN	N/A	Orca		Karmarine Shipyard	

== Lifeships ==
Lifeships are emergency aid vessels developed by Karadeniz Holding to provide both immediate relief and longer-term support to disaster-affected communities. Each vessel is equipped with facilities for food service, medical care, childcare, and education, with the capacity to support up to 1,500 people.

Following the Türkiye–Syria earthquake on February 6, 2023, Karadeniz Holding deployed the first Lifeship, Süheyla Sultan, to the port city of İskenderun in Hatay Province. Over the course of its deployment, the vessel provided shelter and services to approximately 12,000 survivors.
