= Pavel Antokolsky =

Russian poet

- Born: Pavel Grigoryevich Antokolsky; 1 July 1896; Saint Petersburg, Russian Empire
- Died: 9 October 1978 (aged 82); Moscow, Soviet Union
- Occupations: Poet, translator, writer

Pavel Grigoryevich Antokolsky (Russian: Па́вел Григо́рьевич Антоко́льский, IPA: [ˈpavʲɪl ɡrʲɪˈɡorʲjɪvʲɪtɕ ɐntɐˈkolʲskʲɪj]; 1 July 1896, Saint Petersburg, Russian Empire – 9 October 1978, Moscow, Soviet Union) was a Soviet and Russian poet, translator and theatre director.

== Early life and career ==
Antokolsky was born in Saint Petersburg. His mother, Olga Pavlovna, was a niece of the sculptor Mark Antokolsky. The family moved to Moscow in 1904, where he attended a private gymnasium. In 1915, he enrolled in the law faculty at Moscow State University but did not complete his studies. From 1919, he worked as a director at the studio that became the Vakhtangov Theatre, remaining there until 1934. His first poetry collection was published in 1922.

== Poetry and wartime ==
During World War II, Antokolsky directed a front-line theatre and joined the Communist Party on 22 June 1941. His son Vladimir, a junior lieutenant born in 1923, was killed in action in 1942. Antokolsky's long narrative poem Son ("The Son," 1943) was written in response to his son's death. The poem received the Stalin Prize, second degree, in 1946.

In 1956, Antokolsky wrote the poem "All we who in his name..." following Nikita Khrushchev's "secret speech" denouncing Stalinism. The poem circulated among Soviet student groups. In the spring of 1945, he served as regime director at the Tomsk Regional Drama Theatre.

== Translation and later career ==
Antokolsky translated works by Victor Hugo into Russian, including Le Dernier jour d'un condamné and Le roi s'amuse. He also translated Georgian, Bulgarian, Azerbaijani, and Ukrainian poetry. He received the Order of the Red Banner of Labour three times (1946, 1956, 1966) and the Order of Lenin in 1976. He died in Moscow on 9 October 1978 and was buried at Vostryakovskoe Cemetery.
