= MV Karadeniz Powership Kaya Bey =

Floating Power Plant

Karadeniz Powership Kaya Bey
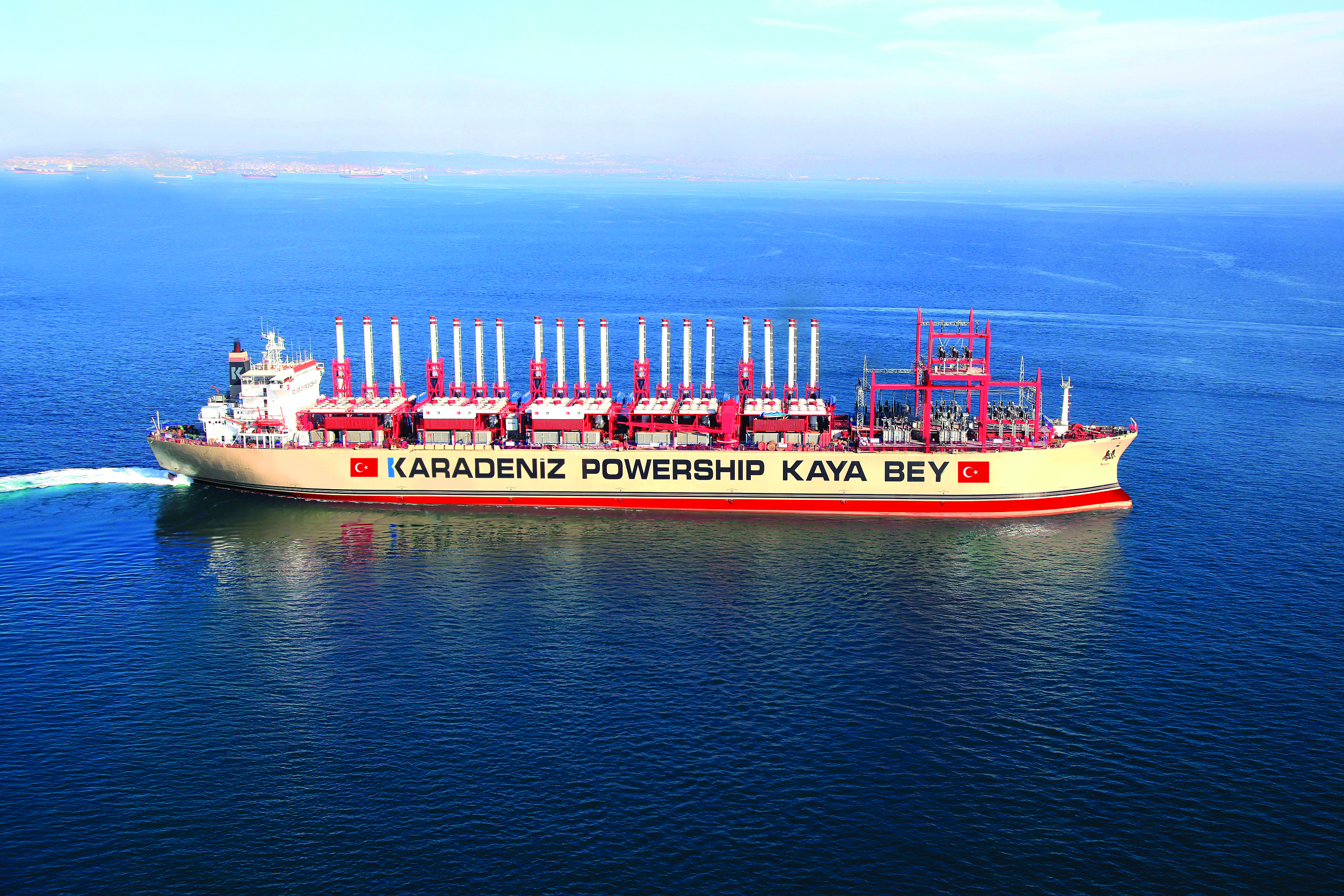
- Karadeniz Powership Kaya Bey

History

Liberia
- Name: Kaya Bey (2009– ); Kamari (2000–09); St Cergue (1991–00); El Amaan (1983–91)
- Owner: Karpowership (2009– )
- Operator: Karpowership
- Builder: Ishibras Shipyard, Verolme Estaleiros Reunidos do Brasil, Angra dos Reis, Brazil
- Completed: 1983
- Homeport: Monrovia, Liberia
- Identification: IMO number: 7925546; MMSI number: 271042525; Callsign: TCZP4

General characteristics
- Class & type: Special Service-Floating Power Plant; formerly Bulk cargo
- Tonnage: 41,521 GT; 75,485 DWT
- Length: 241.89 m (793 ft 7 in) (LOA)
- Beam: 32.20 m (105 ft 8 in)
- Draught: 16.70 m (54 ft 9 in)
- Capacity: 216 MW generation (as Powership)

MV Karadeniz Powership Kaya Bey is a Liberia-flagged powership, a floating oil-burning power plant, owned and operated by Karpowership. Built in 1983 in Brazil and christened MV Gulf Grain, she sailed as a bulk carrier under various names and flags until she was acquired in 2009 to be converted into a Powership in Turkey. The Powership supplied electricity to the power grid in Pakistan, then in Basra, Iraq.

== Cargo ship ==
She was built by the Ishibras Shipyard of Verolme Estaleiros Reunidos do Brasil at Angra dos Reis, Brazil as a bulk carrier in October 1983. The 241.89 m (793 ft 7 in) (LOA) long vessel has a beam of 32.20 m (105 ft 8 in) and a draft of 6.66 m (21 ft 10 in). By 75,485 DWT, she has a cargo capacity of 41,521 GT.

She saw service under the names El-Amaan, St Cergue and Kamari before she was sold in May 2009 to Karpowership.

== Powership ==
She was converted into a Powership and renamed Karadeniz Powership Kaya Bey as the third of the fleet. In 2010 she was considered the "biggest Powership of the world". The vessel is registered under the Liberian flag with homeport Monrovia.

In November 2010 the Powership with 216 MW generation power set sail to Karachi, Pakistan also carrying humanitarian aid for the victims of the 2010 Pakistan floods. She bridged electricity shortage supplying around 20% of the power demand of the 12-million population city of Karachi for a five-year term. The Powership burns heavy fuel oil (HFO), the only available energy resource in Pakistan. After serving in Pakistan, the Powership supplied electricity to Iraq.

== Dispute ==
In March 2012 the Karadeniz Energy Group (Karkey) annulled the energy purchase agreement with the Pakistan National Accountability Bureau (NAB), which covered the service of the Turkish Powerships MV KPS Kaya Bey and the later stationed MV KPS Ali Can Bey, due to non-payment and non-supply of oil. At the end of October 2012 the Pakistani government ordered the repayment of the unused amount of the deposit from the Turkish partner before the ships can leave. Upon a complaint filed by a politician in the Parliament of Pakistan, the Supreme Court of Pakistan ordered the seizure of the retained Powerships due to a fine of US$120 million demanded by the NAB. The case went to international arbitration on March 11, 2013.

On May 16, 2014, after being retained for two years, MV KPS Kaya Bey sailed from Karachi to Dubai for repairs and maintenance, in compliance with an intermediate decision of the International Centre for Settlement of Investment Disputes (ICSID). On August 1 the same year, a second decision of the ICSID enabled the definitive and lasting release of the Powership.

The dispute was also discussed by both countries' prime ministers and state presidents. It was reported that the second Powership and two other vessels of the Turkish company were still in retainment by August 2014.

Tribunal constituted under the World Bank’s arbitral center, ICSID, issued the award in August 2017 in favor of Karkey in the case filed by Karkey against Pakistan. Pakistan has been sentenced to pay the company one of the highest compensation amounts under ICSID.

== Ship's registry ==
- ex-El Amaan until 1991,
- ex-St Cergue until December 2000,
- ex-Kamari registered in Cyprus until May 2009.
