= MV Karadeniz Powership Doğan Bey =

Bulk carrier launched in 1983

Karadeniz Powership Doğan Bey
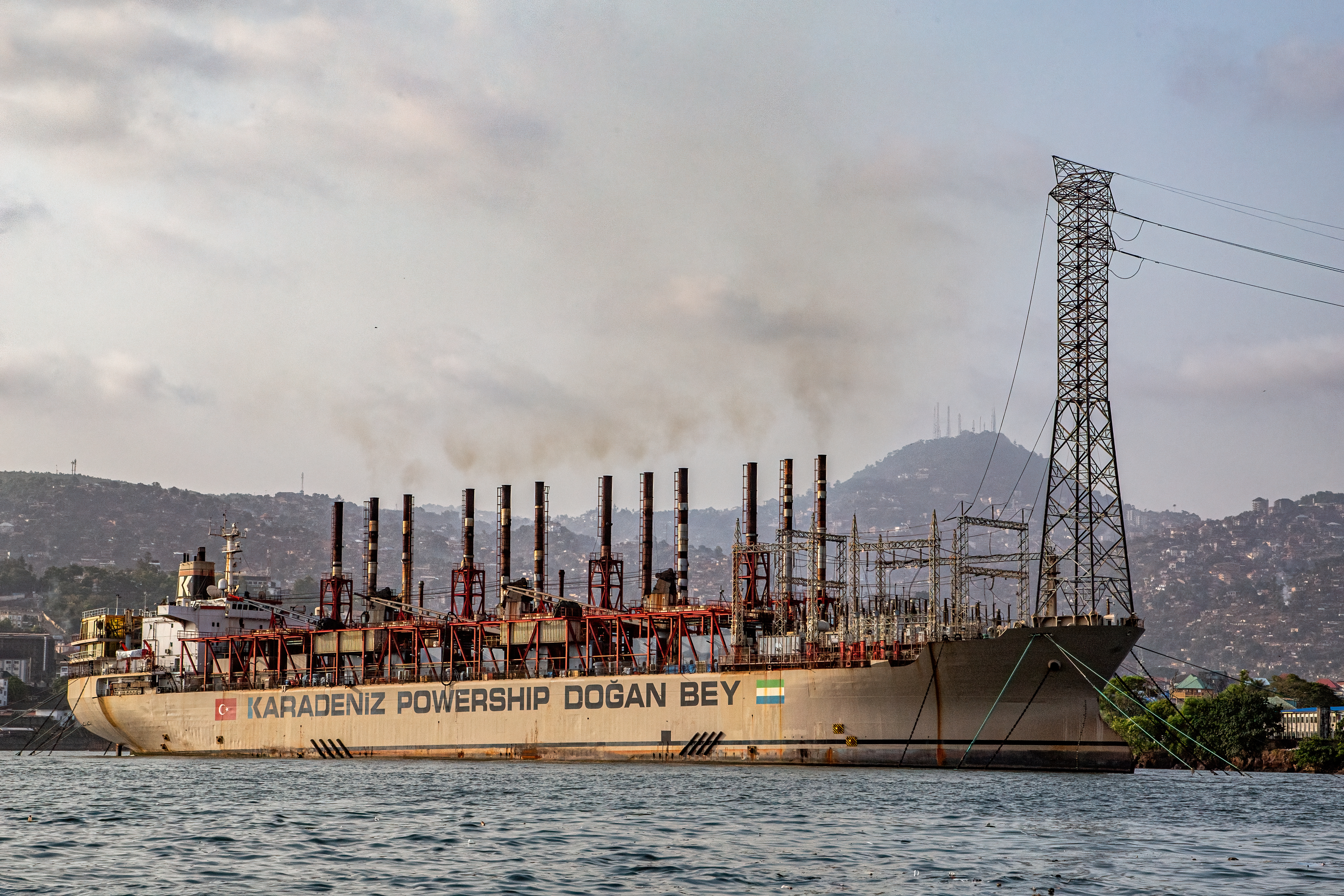
- Doğan Bey moored in Freetown, Sierra Leone (2024)

History

- Name: Karadeniz Powership Doğan Bey; Melpomeni; Seapace; Saqqara; Sono
- Operator: Karpowership
- Port of registry: Liberia
- Builder: Mitsui Engineering & Shipbuilding; Ichihara, Chiba, Japan
- Yard number: 1264
- Completed: 1983
- Identification: IMO number: 8117031

General characteristics
- Class & type: Special Service-Floating Power Plant; formerly Bulk cargo
- Tonnage: 24,729 GT; 41,525 DWT
- Length: 188.14 m (617 ft 3 in) (LOA)
- Beam: 31.00 m (101 ft 8 in)
- Draught: 5.85 m (19 ft 2 in)
- Installed power: MAN B&W diesel engine, 13,100 HP
- Propulsion: Single shaft
- Speed: 14.75 knots (27.32 km/h; 16.97 mph) (avg)
- Capacity: 126 MW generation (as Powership)

The MV Karadeniz Powership Doğan Bey is a Liberia-flagged Powership, a floating power plant, owned and operated by Karpowership. Built 1983 by Mitsui Co. in Ichihara, Chiba, Japan and christened MV Sono, she sailed as a dry cargo ship under various names and flags until in 2010 she was converted into a Powership at the Sedef Shipyard in Tuzla, Turkey. She supplied electricity to the power grid in south-eastern Iraq. Currently, she supplies electricity to Sierra Leone.

== Cargo ship ==
The ship was built in 1983 (according to some sources in 1984) as a bulk carrier with deck mounted cranes by the Japanese shipyard Mitsui Co in Ichihara, Chiba with yard number 1264 and was named Sono. The 188.14 m (617 ft 3 in) long vessel has a beam of 31.00 m (101 ft 8 in) and a draft of 5.85 m (19 ft 2 in). By 41,525 DWT, she has a cargo capacity of 24,729 GT. The ship is propelled by a single screw, which is powered by a 13,100 HP MAN B&W Diesel engine.

Misr Shipping Co. in Egypt purchased and renamed her Saqqara. Later, she was bought by Bright Star Marine in Malta and was renamed Seapace. The Greek company Thenamaris Ships Man. operated the cargo ship under the flag of Malta. Her next owner became another Greek maritime company, Vulcanus Technical Maritime Enterprises S.A., which renamed her to Melpomeni.

=== Sister ships ===
- Seaboxer II, Malta (ex-Aton) (IMO 8117029)
- Radonezh, Liberia (ex-Abydos) (IMO 8117017)
- Searider, Malta (ex-Thebes) (IMO 8204286)

== Powership ==
The freighter Melpomeni was finally acquired in 2009 by Karpowership, a subsidiary of Karadeniz Holding, with the purpose to turn her into a floating power plant sailing under the Liberian flag. She was renamed Karadeniz Powership Doğan Bey after Nuri Doğan Karadeniz, the COO of the parent company.

The Sedef Shipyard in Tuzla, Istanbul was commissioned by May 2009 with the task to convert the cargo ship into a Powership by installing the needed engine generators, transformers and the electric switchboards on board.

Doğan Bey is the first of its kind, a Powership with dual-fuel diesel engines installed on board. Aboard the vessel, twelve generator units are installed having 10.53 MW each. Three units are packed in one of the ship's four holds and fans and funnels mounted on deck.

Bureau Veritas, an international certification agency with experience in overseeing both shipbuilding and power plant development, classified the vessel following its conversion as "special service-floating power plant".

On April 3, 2010, the floating power plant was ready to go to its first mission in Iraq. After a sending-off ceremony held at the Sedef Shipyard in presence of the Turkish and Iraqi ministers of energy, she sailed to Basra, arriving there on May 1.

Doğan Bey was moored at Berth #9 of Umm Qasr Port, south-eastern Iraq, at the country's hub of imports and exports. The power plant on the ship's deck generated electricity using a refined fuel provided by the Iraqi Department of Energy and transmitted it to the national power grid. It is reported that the Powership had the ability to supply Umm Qasr with all the electric energy required and some left over. The power plant on the ship is operated and maintained by Turkish personnel, while for security around 70 local guards were hired. Doğan Bey provided electricity in Iraq for the next five years following a contract signed with the local Department of Energy.

In January 2018, Karpowership signed a contract with Sierra Leone's national utility company, Electricity Distribution and Supply Authority (EDSA) to supply 30 MW of power to Freetown for a duration of 5 years. Doğan Bey is currently in Sierra Leone.

== Ship's registry ==
- ex-MV Sono
- ex-MV Saqqara, Egypt-flagged, owned by Misr Shipping Co. and operated by The Egyptian Navigation Co.
- ex-MV Seapace, Malta-flagged, owned by Bright Star Marine, Malta and operated by Thenamaris Ships Man., Greece.
- ex-MV Melpomeni, Malta-flagged, owned and operated by Vulcanus Technical Maritime Enterprises S.A., Greece
