= Powership =

Floating power station

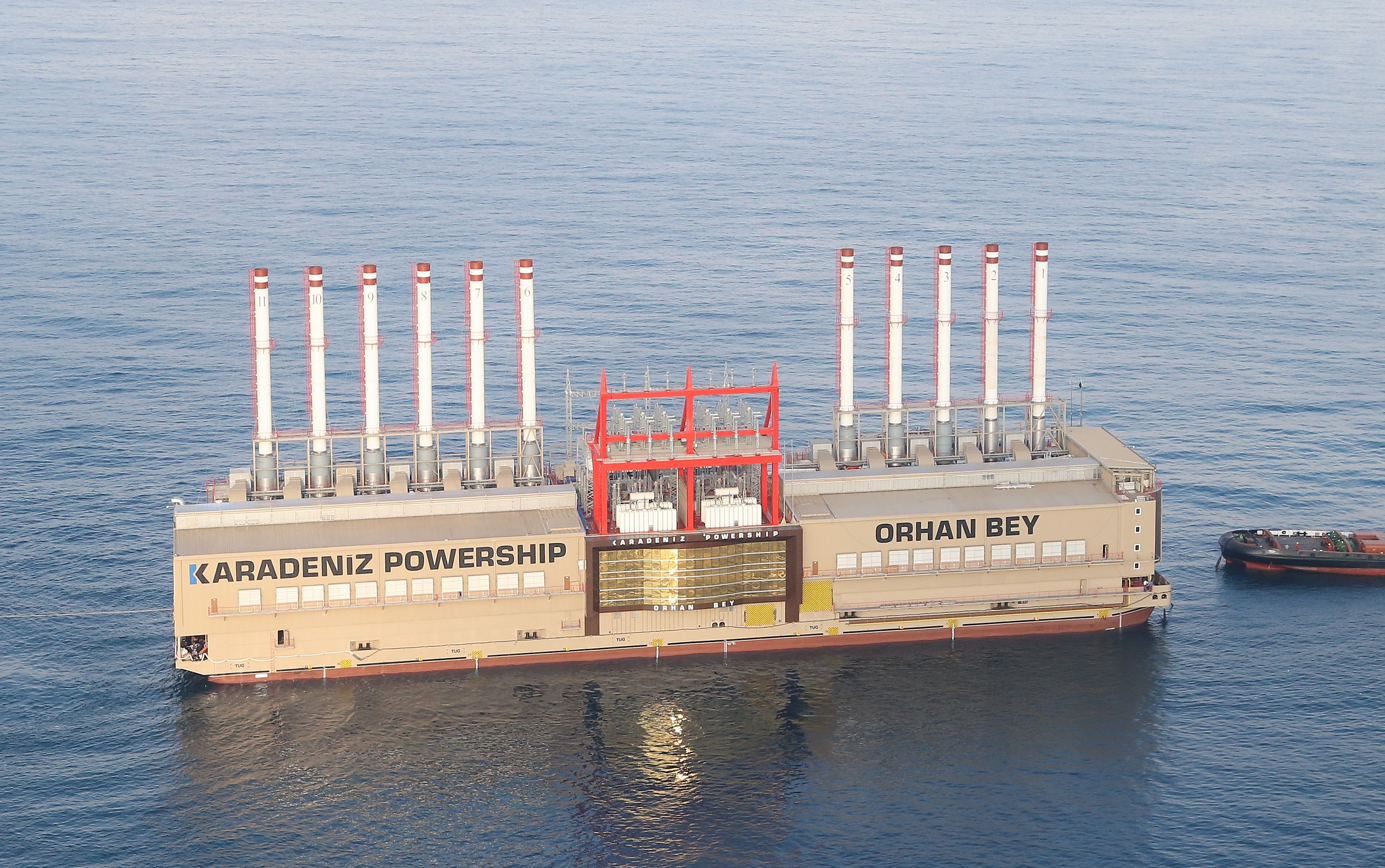
MV Orhan Bey, a power ship which was formerly a bulk carrier ship.

A powership (or power ship) is a special purpose ship, on which a power plant is installed to serve as a power generation resource.

Converted from existing ships, powerships are self-propelled, ready to go infrastructure for developing countries that plug into national grids where required. Unmotorised powerships, known as power barges, are power plants installed on a deck barge. These are sometimes called "floating power plants" or "barge mounted power plants". They were initially developed during World War II by General Electric for the War Production Board as a transportable large-scale power generation resource.

Powerships or power barges can be equipped with single or multiple gas turbines, reciprocating diesel and gas engines, boilers or nuclear reactors for electricity generation. Bureau Veritas, an international certification agency with experience in overseeing both shipbuilding and power plant development, classifies such floating power plants as "special service power plants".

== History ==
One of the earliest use of a ship as a power plant was the USS Lexington. During a 30-day power shortage in the winter of 1929 and 1930, the turbo-electric engines of the aircraft carrier provided Tacoma with electricity.

The SS Jacona was one of the first permanent powerships. It was converted in 1931 by the Newport News Shipbuilding and Drydock Company of Virginia for the New England Public Service Company of Augusta, Maine. The idea came to the president of the Augusta firm, when one winter a severe winter storm took out a lot of the New England major power transmission lines. The role of the Jacona would be to dock as near as possible to the affected area and hook into the local power grid, restoring power. During the summer months the Jacona would hook into vacation area power grids where power needs are extremely low during off season and extremely high during the summer vacation season. The Jacona was fitted with steam boilers which drove two generators which could produce 10 MW each.

At one time the US Navy used its submarines when disaster hit a local community that brought down the commercial power grid, which led to the idea of powerships for the US Navy, and an early US Navy powership was the USS Saranac, a former US Navy naval ship. Saranac was a 1942 built fleet oiler before her conversion into a powership following the Second World War to serve in the US Navy and Army. In 1957, she was sold to Hugo Neu Corporation of New York City and was used then as a power facility abroad by the International Steel and Metal Corporation. In 1959, she was renamed Somerset.

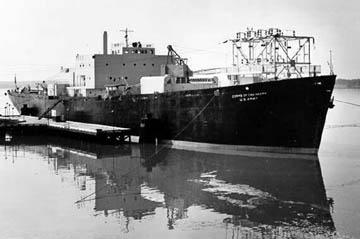
MH-1A, the first floating nuclear powership

The first floating nuclear reactor ship was the MH-1A, used in the Panama canal zone from 1968 to 1975. This ship (named Sturgis) was decommissioned and scrapped over the period of 2015 to 2019.

During the 1990s, power barges became a popular way of providing energy to developing nations, with companies building power barges including equipment suppliers like General Electric, Westinghouse, Wärtsilä, and MAN; and by developers such as Smith Cogeneration, AES, GMR Vasavi, which operate floating power plants for customers located in New York City (United States), Khulna (Bangladesh), the Dominican Republic, Brazil, Ecuador, Angola, Nigeria, Thailand, Effassu (Ghana), as well as in the Philippines, Jamaica, Kenya and Malaysia. Engineering, procurement and construction companies such Power Barge Corporation, Waller Marine Inc, Hyundai, IHI Corporation and Mitsui offer gas turbine power barge construction programs, and Karadeniz Energy, MAN and Wärtsilä offer medium speed engine power barges.

In April 2011, Waller Marine finalized installation in Venezuela of two large floating power generation barges into a prepared basin at Tacoa. The two 171 MW barges, each supporting a GE 7FA dual fuel industrial gas turbine, are connected to the grid and soon supply much needed power to Caracas. Power Barge Corporation recently delivered a 96 MW gas turbine power barge to Angola, a 72 MW Wartsila power barge to Panama and a 105 MW gas turbine power barge to Venezuela.

Starting in 2007 and finally finishing in 2018 the Russian Federation constructed the nuclear power barge Akademik Lomonosov, which was used to replace the aging Bilibino Nuclear Power Plant in the Northeastern Chukotka region. In late May 2020, it began operating in the Arctic port city of Pevek, supplying power to the nearby gold mines and settlements. In 2018, two Chinese companies announced that they would build a fleet of nuclear power barges for the South China Sea islands but the project was suspended in May 2023.

== Economics ==
Powerships (as opposed to power barges) are generally based on existing ships repurposed to produce electricity. Powerships utilizing new purpose-built ships would not be competitive to a purpose-built power barge due to the higher cost of construction. The crew quarters and propulsion systems are under-utilized during the power plant operational period which can be up to the life of the power plant. Some recently built powerships are existing large bulk carriers, which are fitted with used reciprocating engines and new state-of-the-art, large-bore dual-fuel diesel engines that run on heavy fuel or natural gas to generate electricity, transformers and electric switchboards. The only other powerships were based on US Naval vessels.

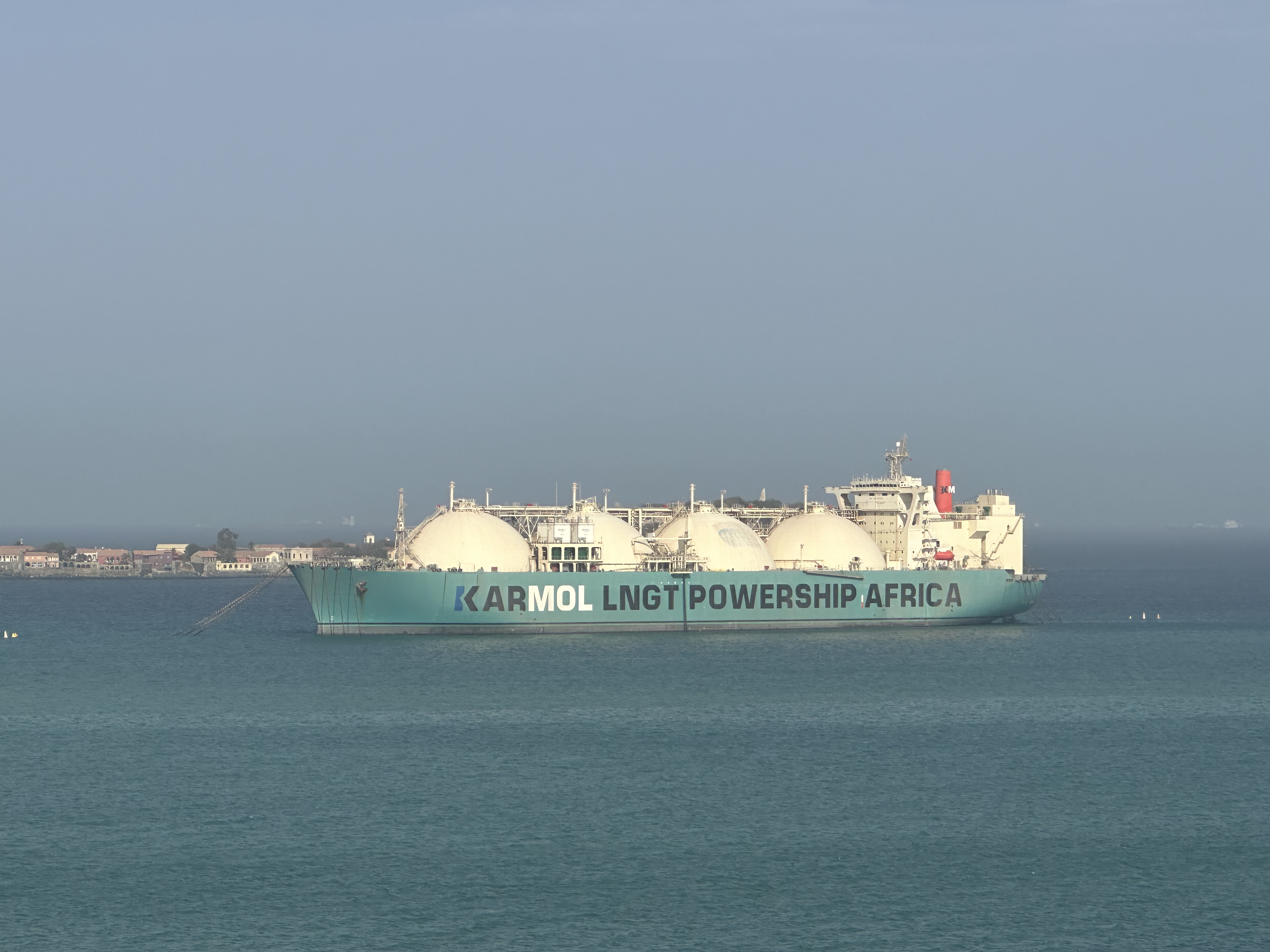
KARMOL LNGT Powership Africa off Dakar, Senegal.

== Use ==
Power barges and powerships offer a number of advantages over other forms of power plant. Due to their mobility, powerships can be connected to local power grids to temporarily cover demands whenever on site power plants are insufficient or the building of new power plants will take time, while dual-fuel engines on board can be powered by either liquid fuels or gas. The power barge and powership are able to use any infrastructure available at the site on which she is required.

Powerships and power barges are generally considered a solution to bridge the gap for a certain time until a local power plant is built or the high demand in electricity supply is over.

Today there are over 75 power barges deployed and operating around the world. The utilization rate of power barges is around 95% with only one or two power barges available in the global market at any one time.

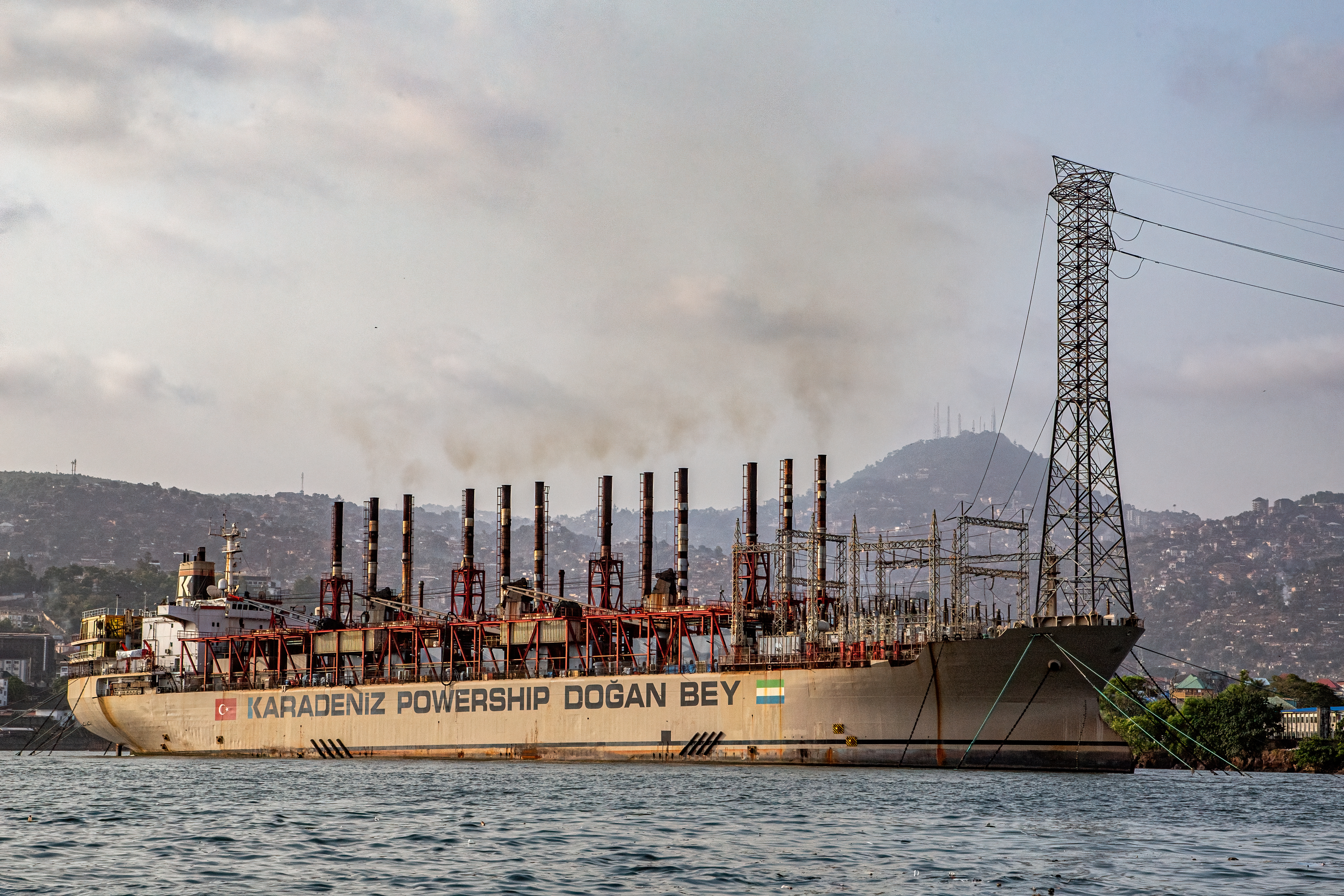
MV Karadeniz Powership Doğan Bey, Freetown, Sierra Leone

Karadeniz Powership Co. Ltd., trading as Karpowership, a subsidiary of Karadeniz Energy Group based in Turkey, developed and carries out a project named "Power of Friendship" that aims to provide a total of 2,010 MW of electricity to more than ten shortage-stricken countries in the Middle East, northern Africa and south Asia with ten different ships by the end of 2010. The first powership of the project, which can supply 144 MW power, went into service at the beginning of 2010 off the shore near Basra in south-eastern Iraq, and the second powership is on its way to the same place.

== See also ==
- MH-1A, a floating power station constructed as part of the Army Nuclear Power Program
- Floating nuclear power plant
- Floating wind turbine
