= 2024 in Lebanon =

- Decades: 2000s; 2010s; 2020s
- See also: Other events of 2024; Timeline of Lebanese history

Events in the year 2024 in Lebanon.

== Incumbents ==
Photo	Post	Name
	President of Lebanon	Vacant
	Prime Minister of Lebanon	Najib Mikati

== Events ==
Ongoing: Israel–Hezbollah conflict (2023–present).

=== January ===
- 2 January – Assassination of Saleh al-Arouri: Israel conducts an airstrike in the Dahieh neighborhood of Beirut, resulting in the assassination of Saleh al-Arouri, the deputy chairman of the Hamas political bureau.
- 8 January – Israel assassinates Wissam al-Tawil, the deputy commander of Hezbollah's Redwan Force, in Majdel Selm.
- 9 January – Hezbollah launches a drone attack on the Israel Defense Force (IDF) Northern Command headquarters in Safed, Israel, marking its deepest incursion into Israeli territory since the outbreak of hostilities. In retaliation, Israel assassinates Ali Hussein Barji, the commander of Hezbollah's air force in Southern Lebanon.

=== February ===
- 8 February
  - An IDF drone targets a car in Nabatieh. Israeli media reports that Abbas al-Dabs, a regional Hezbollah commander, is assassinated in the attack.
  - Veterans protesting outside the Lebanese parliament and the Prime Minister's residence are met with tear gas by security forces.
- 11 February – A five-story building collapses in Choueifat.
- 14 February – A rocket attack from Lebanon against a military base kills a person and injures others in Safed, Israel, while Israeli airstrikes kill three civilians in Souaneh and a Hezbollah fighter in Aadchit, in southern Lebanon; eleven others are wounded. Seven people are killed in a rocket attack on an apartment building in Nabatieh.
- 26 February – Israel Air Force (IAF) jets conduct strikes on Hezbollah positions.

=== March ===
- 2 March – An IDF strike on a car in the coastal road of Naqoura kills a senior Hezbollah official and two other members of Hezbollah's Imam Hussein Division. It is reported that among them was the grandson of Hassan Nasrallah.
- 4 March
  - An anti-tank missile from Lebanon kills an Indian foreign worker and injures seven others in Margaliot, Israel.
  - Three volunteer rescue workers are killed in an attack on an Islamic Health Authority center in Odaisseh.
- 5 March – Two Hezbollah members and a woman are killed in an IDF raid in Hula in response to the attack on 4 March.
- 26 March – The IAF launches airstrikes against Hezbollah targets near the towns of Ras Baalbek and Hermel in Baalbek-Hermel Governorate, killing at least three Hezbollah members.

=== April ===
- 8 April – Killing of Pascal Suleiman: Pascal Suleiman, a Lebanese Forces coordinator in the Byblos District, is abducted and murdered by a Syrian gang in a car theft. In response, activists block roads and attack Syrian refugees demanding them to leave the country.
- 10 April – A man sanctioned by the United States for smuggling money to Iranian-backed groups is found killed in Beit Mery.
- 16 April – The IDF conducts an airstrike and assassinates Ismail Yusuf Baz, the commander of Hezbollah's coastal sector in Lebanon.
- 23 April – An IAF airstrike kills two people and injures six others in Hanine.
- 30 April – An explosion and subsequent fire at a Beirut restaurant kills nine people.

=== May ===
- 5 May – Israeli air raids in Meiss Ej Jabal cause "massive destruction," according to a Lebanese state-run agency, killing four civilians and wounding two others. In response, Hezbollah fires dozens of Katyusha and Falaq rockets towards Kiryat Shmona in northern Israel.
- 16 May – A Lebanese Army raid to arrest drug traffickers in the Shatila refugee camp leads to the death of one and the injury of another.
- 31 May – A medic is killed and another injured during an Israeli airstrike against an ambulance in Naqoura.

=== June ===
- 5 June – 2024 Beirut US embassy shooting: Three alleged members of ISIS attack the U.S embassy in the Awkar suburb of Beirut. The Lebanese Army captures one suspect, who is of Syrian nationality, and kills another.
- 6 June – Hezbollah strikes an Iron Dome battery in Ramot Naftali, Israel.
- 9 June – Two people are killed in Israeli airstrikes near Aitaroun according to the National News Agency.
- 12 June – Israel kills three Hezbollah fighters and Taleb Abdullah, a senior commander, in southern Lebanon. Hezbollah retaliates by launching over 250 rockets towards northern Israel, the most the group has sent in the war.
- 17 June – Hezbollah commander Muhammad Ahmed Ayoub is allegedly killed in an Israeli airstrike in Selaa, with further strikes occurring against Hezbollah targets across southern Lebanon.
- 19 June:
  - Hezbollah announces that an Israeli strike killed three of its fighters.
  - Hezbollah secretary general Hassan Nasrallah threatens Cyprus if it allows Israel to use its airports and bases for military exercises.

=== July ===
- 3 July –
  - Senior Hezbollah field commander Mohammed Nasser is killed in an Israeli airstrike in Tyre.
  - Hezbollah launches a barrage of at least 100 Katyusha rockets towards northern Israel, targeting IDF positions, in retaliation for the killing of Nasser.
- 4 July – Hezbollah launches at least 200 rockets and a swarm of drones at ten IDF sites and threatens to expand its targeting range, in retaliation for the killing of Mohammed Nasser, a top Hezbollah commander.
- 9 July – Hezbollah launches dozens of rockets at the Israeli-occupied Golan Heights, Syria killing two Israelis.
- 15 July – An Israeli airstrike on Bint Jbeil, kills three civilians and injures three others. The IDF says that its fighter jets struck a Hezbollah weapons storage facility in the area.
- 16 July – Three Syrian children are killed by an Israeli airstrike on the village of Umm al-Tut in southern Lebanon, while two others are killed during a strike on the Kfar Tebnit-Khardali road.
- 26 July – U.S. President Joe Biden adds Lebanon to the Deferred Enforced Departure list, temporarily protecting Lebanese citizens residing in the United States from deportation for 18 months, in response to growing tensions between Israel and Hezbollah in southern Lebanon.
- 27 July – Majdal Shams attack:
  - Twelve people, including several children, are killed in rocket strikes on the Druze village of Majdal Shams in the Israeli-Occupied Golan Heights. Israel claims that Hezbollah is responsible for the attack, but Hezbollah denies any involvement.
  - Israeli Prime Minister Benjamin Netanyahu vows that Hezbollah will "pay a heavy price" which "it has not paid so far" in response to the attack.
- 28 July – Several nations, including the United States, Australia, and multiple European nations release travel advisories urging all their citizens not to travel to Lebanon, and for those residing there to leave as soon as possible in anticipation of an Israeli attack against Hezbollah.
- 30 July –
  - An Israeli civilian is killed in the HaGoshrim kibbutz by a rocket fired from Lebanon.
  - 2024 Haret Hreik airstrike: Israel launches a missile attack on southern Beirut, killing senior Hezbollah commander Fuad Shukr and at least four civilians and injuring 80 others.

=== August ===
- 3 August – The United States embassy in Beirut urges its citizens to leave the country amid increasing tensions in the Middle East.
- 8 August –
  - One Lebanese civilian and a Hezbollah militant are killed and three Lebanese civilians are injured in Israeli strikes in southern Lebanon.
  - Hezbollah fires 25 rockets at the Israeli-occupied Golan Heights and fifteen rockets at Shlomi and Kabri in Upper Galilee, Israel. All rockets are intercepted by the Iron Dome.
- 9 August – Samer al-Hajj, a Hamas security official for the Ain al-Hilweh Palestinian refugee camp, is assassinated by an Israeli drone strike in Sidon.
- 12 August – Hezbollah fires 30 Katyusha rockets targeting the IDF 146th Division headquarters in Ga'aton and an IDF surveillance station in Metula. An Israeli Iron Dome interceptor missile destroys an Avdon residence.
- 13 August – The IAF launches airstrikes on Hezbollah targets in Kfar Kila, Marwahin, Meiss Ej Jabal and Aita al-Shaab.
- 15 August – Hezbollah launches four rockets at IDF targets in Shamir and Malkia in Upper Galilee which were intercepted by the Iron Dome causing a fire in Shamir and Ruwaysat al-Alam of Kfarchouba in southern Lebanon.
- 17 August –
  - An Israeli airstrike on a residential building in Nabatieh kills ten people, including a mother and her to children, and injured five others. The IDF claims that it was a Hezbollah storage facility.
  - Hezbollah reportedly strikes the Ayelet HaShahar kibbutz in Upper Galilee, Israel, wounding two Israeli soldiers in retaliation.
  - 2024 Lebanese blackout: The state electricity company Électricité du Liban runs out of fuel reserves and announces that it can no longer supply power to the country, leading to a complete nationwide blackout.
- 19 August –
  - Several Israeli civilians are injured in Ya'ara in Hezbollah rocket launches and drone strikes in Western Galilee that were intercepted by the Iron Dome. Hezbollah claims that it attacked and repelled Israeli soldiers attempting to infiltrate southern Lebanon through the Hadab Aita forest and inflicted casualties.
  - Israeli airstrikes strike Hezbollah infrastructure in Aita al-Shaab, Beit Lif and Hula.
- 20 August –
  - The IAF launches airstrikes on Baalbek.
  - Four people are killed and two others are injured by Israeli strikes in Daraya, Mount Lebanon Governorate, according to the Lebanese Health Ministry. In response, Hezbollah launches drone strikes on IDF positions in the Israeli-occupied Golan Heights.
- 21 August – Khalil al-Muqdah, a commander in the Al-Aqsa Martyrs' Brigades, is killed during an Israeli airstrike on his vehicle in Sidon.
- 22 August –
  - The IDF launches airstrikes on Hezbollah targets in Chihine and related infrastructure in southern Lebanon.
  - Hezbollah shells and launches Katyusha rockets on IDF outposts in Ramot Naftali, Biranit, Zaura, Kiryat Shmona, Jal al-Allam, Malikiya, al-Marj, Matla and Ghajar in the Golan Heights.
- 23 August –
  - Hezbollah launches rocket strikes on IDF targets in Mount Meron and al-Malikiyah that were intercepted by the Iron Dome and caused wildfires.
  - The IDF claims it killed Hezbollah militants following airstrikes and shelling on Tayr Harfa and Shebaa.
- 25 August – August 2024 Lebanon strikes: The IDF launches preemptive strikes on southern Lebanon.
- 28 August –Three Palestinian fighters and one Hezbollah militant are killed in a drone strike on a vehicle at a checkpoint on the Lebanon–Syria border.
- 29 August – Israeli airstrikes hit Hezbollah targets in Kafr Kila and Yarine.

=== September ===
- 2 September – Two people are killed, including a contractor working for UNIFIL, during an Israeli airstrike on a vehicle on the Tyre-Naqoura road.
- 3 September – Riad Salameh, the former governor of the Banque du Liban, is arrested amid a financial investigation. He is subsequently charged with embezzling $42 million in public funds.
- 4 September – A civilian is killed and seven others are injured in Israeli airstrikes and shelling in southern Lebanon.
- 7 September – Three Lebanese paramedics are killed and two others are wounded in an Israeli airstrike while they were firefighting in Faroun. Two Amal militants are also killed in southern Lebanon. Hezbollah launches over 100 missiles and artillery at IDF targets in Mount Neria, Biranit, Hadab Yaroun and Raheb in retaliation.
- 8 September –
  - IDF claims Hezbollah militants are killed in airstrikes on Hezbollah targets in Aitaroun, Maroun al-Ras and Yaroun.
  - Hezbollah launches Katyusha rockets on Kiryat Shmona and Shamir in northern Israel.
- 9 September – A Hezbollah militant is killed and two civilians are injured in an Israeli airstrike in Saghbine.
- 17 September –
  - At least twelve people are killed and thousands of others including Hezbollah members and medics are injured after pagers that they were using explode nationwide, including in Beirut. Among those reported injured is the Iranian ambassador, Mojtaba Amani.
  - Three Hezbollah militants are killed and two others injured in Israeli airstrikes on Blida.
- 18 September – Another series of explosions involving Hezbollah communication devices are reported across Lebanon. At least 25 people are killed, while 600 others are injured.
- 19 September – The IAF strikes more than 100 Hezbollah targets in southern Lebanon, destroying multiple rocket launch systems and weapons depots. Lebanese security forces say the raids are the most intense since the conflict began. Israeli fighter jets are also reported over Beirut. One Hezbollah militant is killed.
- 20 September – Assassination of Ibrahim Aqil: The IAF launches an airstrike on Dahieh, Beirut targeting Hezbollah’s operations commander Ibrahim Aqil. At least 45 people are killed, while more than 60 others are injured. Hezbollah also confirms that Ahmed Wahbi, a top commander who oversaw the military operations of the Redwan Force during the Gaza war until early 2024, was killed in the attack.
- 22 September – Hezbollah launches a barrage of rockets at an IDF base in Haifa, Israel, in retaliation for the assassination of Ibrahim Aqil. An Israeli civilian is slightly injured by an Iron Dome interception.
- 23 September –
  - September 2024 Lebanon strikes: The IAF conducts over 1,300 airstrikes against Hezbollah in southern Lebanon, killing at least 569 people, including 50 children, and wounding over 1,835 others.
  - UNIFIL advises all posted civilian employees to evacuate southern Lebanon.
  - The IDF advises Lebanese civilians in southern Lebanon to evacuate north.
- 24 September –
  - The IDF announces that they killed Ibrahim Qubaisi, Hezbollah's missile and rocket force commander, in an airstrike in Beirut.
  - The Lebanese Football Association suspends all football matches indefinitely amid Israeli airstrikes on the country.
- 25 September –
  - Hezbollah launches a ballistic missile targeting the Mossad headquarters in Tel Aviv, which is intercepted, while Israel conducts a further 260 airstrikes across Lebanon.
  - The United States, the European Union, and several other countries call for an immediate 21-day ceasefire along the Blue Line on the Israel–Lebanon border.
- 26 September –
  - Over 22,000 residents in Lebanon have crossed into Syria to escape ongoing Israeli airstrikes and potential escalation of conflict.
  - Two people are killed, including Mohammad Hussein Srour, a senior Hezbollah commander, and 15 injured during an airstrike in Beirut. 115 airstrikes across the rest of Lebanon kill at least 60 and injure 81.
  - Israel rejects proposals from the United States, Australia, and the European Union to initiate a temporary 21-day ceasefire with Hezbollah.
- 27 September – At least fifteen airstrikes are carried out against Beirut, in what is described as the worst attack in the city so far. Israel claims they have targeted Hezbollah's central headquarters. Four buildings are destroyed. Hezbollah Secretary-General Hassan Nasrallah is also killed in the attacks, along with Abbas Nilforoushan, an Iranian Islamic Revolutionary Guard Corps deputy commander. Interim Prime Minister Najib Mikati announces three days of national mourning in Lebanon for Nasrallah beginning on 30 September.
- 28 September – The IDF begins a blockade of Beirut–Rafic Hariri International Airport in order to prevent the shipment of Iranian weapons to Lebanon. The blockade will not affect the operation of civilian flights at the airport.
- 29 September – At least 105 people are killed by Israeli airstrikes in Lebanon, including 32 in Ain El Delb and 21 in Baalbek-Hermel Governorate. At least 359 others are injured. Hezbollah confirms that Nabil Qaouk, the group's senior official, and Ali Karaki, a senior commander, were killed in the airstrikes in Dahieh.
- 30 September –
  - Three militants of the Popular Front for the Liberation of Palestine are killed during an Israeli airstrike in Kola District, Beirut. Separately, Hamas's commander in Lebanon, Fatah Sharif, is killed alongside his family in Sidon.
  - Five children belonging to the Imam al-Mahdi Scouts are killed in an airstrike in Charkiyeh.
  - Israel tells the United States it will launch an imminent ground invasion of Southern Lebanon. The military operation will focus on clearing out Hezbollah infrastructure near Israeli border communities, according to officials.
  - At least 95 people are killed and 172 others are injured in Israeli airstrikes across Lebanon.
  - A Lebanese Army soldier is killed in an Israeli drone strike in Wazzani.

=== October ===
- 1 October –
  - 2024 Israeli invasion of Lebanon: Israeli forces enter southern Lebanon as a ground operation against Hezbollah begins.
  - Israel launches an airstrike in the Ain al-Hilweh refugee camp in Sidon targeting Munir al-Maqdah, an official with the Al-Aqsa Martyrs' Brigades in Lebanon.
- 2 October – Hezbollah kills two Israeli soldiers and wounds 18 others who conducted an incursion into Lebanon.
- 3 October –
  - Nine medics are killed after an Israeli airstrike on an Islamic Health Authority office in Beirut, bringing the death toll of the medics killed in the country in the last two weeks to 97.
  - Two Lebanese army soldiers are killed in separate Israeli strikes on south Lebanon.
  - The Lebanese Armed Forces open fire on Israeli troops near Bint Jbeil, Nabatieh Governorate, for the first time since the invasion began.
  - The Hellenic Air Force evacuates Greek and Cypriot nationals from Beirut–Rafic Hariri International Airport in Lebanon.
  - Senior Hezbollah official Hashem Safieddine, who is expected to succeed Hassan Nasrallah as the group's secretary-general following his assassination, is killed by an Israeli airstrike in Beirut.
- 10 October – An Israeli airstrike in central Beirut reportedly targeting senior Hezbollah official Wafic Safa kills at least 22 people and injures 117 others.
- 13 October – The IDF forcibly enters a UNIFIL outpost in Ramyeh, while 15 peacekeepers are injured by smoke coming from nearby munitions rounds.
- 14 October – At least 21 people are killed in an Israeli airstrike on an apartment building in Aitou.
- 16 October – An Israeli airstrike on the municipal building of Nabatieh kills at least 16 people, including the town's mayor Ahmad Kahil.
- 19 October – A drone attack from Lebanon is made on the residence of Israeli Prime Minister Benjamin Netanyahu in Caesarea. No casualties are reported, while Hezbollah claims responsibility for the attack.
- 20 October – Three Lebanese soldiers are killed in an Israeli strike on their truck after being mistakenly identified as Hezbollah militants, prompting an apology from the IDF.
- 25 October – Three journalists working for Al Mayadeen and Al Manar are killed in an Israeli airstrike on a guesthouse in Hasbaya.
- 29 October –
  - At least 60 people are killed in Israeli airstrikes in the Bekaa Valley.
  - Hezbollah elects Naim Qassem as its new Secretary-General.

=== November ===
- 17 November – Mohammed Afif, the media chief of Hezbollah, is killed along with three others in an Israeli airstrike on the offices of the Lebanese branch of the Arab Socialist Ba'ath Party – Syria Region in the Ras el-Nabaa neighbourhood of Beirut.
- 27 November – A ceasefire agreement comes into effect between Israel and Hezbollah, under which both of its forces would withdraw from southern Lebanon south of the Litani River in exchange for the Lebanese army being deployed in the area.

== Holidays ==
- 1 January – New Year's Day
- 6 January – Epiphany and Armenian Christmas
- 9 February – St. Maroun Day
- 25 March – Annunciation Day
- 29 March – Good Friday
- 31 March – Easter Sunday
- 10 April – Eid al-Fitr
- 1 May – Labour Day
- 25 May – Liberation and Resistance Day
- 17 June – Eid al-Adha
- 7 July – Islamic New Year
- 15 August – Assumption Day
- 16 September – The Prophet's Birthday
- 22 November – Lebanese Independence Day
- 25 December – Christmas Day

== Deaths ==
- 8 January – Wissam al-Tawil, 53–54, militant, senior commander of Hezbollah.
- 9 January – Ali Hussein Barji, militant.
- 17 January – Hussein Madi, 85, painter and sculptor.
- 26 February – Fadi Ibrahim, 67, actor and director
- 8 April – Pascal Suleiman, IT specialist and politician, Lebanese Forces official
- 19 May – Ali Al-Kourani, 79, Shia cleric
- 7 July – Anwar Sabbah, 90, politician
- 30 July – Fuad Shukr, 63, Hezbollah's Jihad Council member
- 12 August – Samir Chamas, 81, actor and writer
- 14 August – Georges Corm, 84, economist and author
- 25 August – Salim Al-Huss, 94, former Prime Minister (1976-1980, 1987-1990 and 1998-2000).
- 15 September – Elias Khoury, 76, novelist and advocate
- 27 September –
  - Hassan Nasrallah, 64, Secretary-General of Hezbollah
  - Ali Karaki, 56–67, commander of the southern front of Hezbollah
