= Lebanon–Turkey relations =

- Lebanon: Turkey

Diplomatic mission
- Embassy of Lebanon, Ankara: Embassy of Turkey, Beirut

Lebanon–Turkey relations are the bilateral relations between Lebanon and Turkey. Lebanon has an embassy in Ankara and a consulate general in Istanbul. Turkey has an embassy in Beirut. The two nations are connected through history as Lebanon gained independence from the Ottoman Empire. Both countries are members of the Union for the Mediterranean and Organisation of Islamic Cooperation. Turkey has been a big provider of aid to Lebanon.

== Historical relations ==
The Ottoman Empire, which controlled Lebanon from 1516 to 1918, had Lebanon as the most diverse region in the Ottoman Empire. There were several ethnic and religious tensions, notably the infamous 1840 Lebanon conflict and 1860 Mount Lebanon civil war which devastated Lebanon and the Ottomans further imposed strict rule in Lebanon.

During the World War I, the Ottomans imposed a forcible blockade to prevent supplies from being taken by the French and the British. However, this resulted in the Great Famine of Mount Lebanon, which claimed the lives of a half of the Lebanese population at the time. This formed the basic disdain and hostility against Turkey among Lebanese population.

== Modern relations ==
=== Humanitarian aid ===
During the 2006 Lebanon War, in tandem with shipments of aid the Palestinians sent on 19 July and 27 July, the Red Crescent announced on 31 July that two Arctic trucks carrying medical aid, foodstuffs and kitchen utensils were being sent from Turkey to Lebanon.

In 2013, following the increasing shortages of electricity in Lebanon, Turkey supplied the country with MV Karadeniz Powership Fatmagül Sultan and MV Karadeniz Powership Orhan Bey to ensure electric development for the country.

During the Lebanese liquidity crisis, Turkey provided humanitarian assistance to Lebanon in April 2022. They delivered shipments of food, baby formula, and basic needs.

=== Competing with Iran ===
The Turkish Government under Recep Tayyip Erdoğan has perceived Hezbollah, a Shi'a paramilitary and political group backed by Iran, with a negative perception, based on historical trauma in Lebanon and the threat to Turkish legacies in Lebanon. Thus Turkey has sought to maintain closer tie with Lebanon, to dismantle Iranian influence inside Lebanon. The influx of Hezbollah fighters coming to Syria fighting against the Syrian National Army is also the reason why Turkey tries to establish stronger ties with Lebanon in order to weaken Iran's role in Lebanon.

=== Turkish influence ===
While Lebanon has been relatively out of the knowledge of the Turkish population, the recent political brawl had led to some several fallouts of relationship. In September 2019, Lebanese President Michel Aoun tweeted his criticism on the Ottoman rule and expressed concerns about the return of Turkey to Lebanon, and summoned the Turkish ambassador as well. Lebanon recognizes the Armenian Genocide.

After the 2020 Beirut explosions, Vice President of Turkey, Fuat Oktay, and Foreign Minister, Mevlüt Çavuşoğlu, visited Lebanon and met Lebanese President Michel Aoun and Parliament Speaker Nabih Berri. During the visit, Çavuşoğlu said:

We also stand with our kin, the Turks and Turkmens in Lebanon and around the world. We will grant Turkish citizenship to our brothers who say 'I am Turkish, I am Turkmen,' and express their desire to become a citizen. These are our [Turkish] President [Recep Tayyip] Erdoğan's instructions.

—

=== Israel-Lebanon conflicts ===
Following the end of Bashar Al-Asad's regime in Syria, the ongoing conflict between Lebanon and Israel and the ongoing economic situation in Lebanon, Turkish Energy Minister Alparslan Bayraktar has said that Turkey is willing to supply electricity to both countries.

Following the escalation of Israeli military operations in Lebanon in May 2026, Turkish Foreign Minister Hakan Fidan described Israel's actions in Lebanon as "blatant aggression." He further stated that a ceasefire is needed on all fronts.

== Resident diplomatic missions ==
- Lebanon has an embassy in Ankara and a consulate-general in Istanbul.
- Turkey has an embassy in Beirut.

== See also ==
- Foreign relations of Lebanon
- Foreign relations of Turkey
- Turks in Lebanon
