= Falak =

Falak or similar can mean:

- al-Falaq, a sura in the Qur'an
- Falak music, a Central Asian musical genre
- Falak (Arabian legend), a giant serpent in Arabian legend
- Falak (1988 film), an Indian Hindi-language film by Shashilal K. Nair
- Baby Falak (2010–2012), two-year-old Indian child abuse victim, see Death of Baby Falak
- Falak, Fars, a village in Fars, Iran
- Falak, South Khorasan, a village in South Khorasan, Iran

== See also ==
- Falaq (disambiguation)
- Falaknuma Palace, Hyderabad, India
