= List of power stations in Lebanon =

This article lists all power stations in Lebanon.

== Thermal ==
Station	Coordinates	Capacity (MW)	Fuel	Year commissioned	Operator
Zouk	33°58′12″N 35°36′14″E	607	Fuel oil	1984–1987	Électricité du Liban
Zahrani	33°29′46″N 35°20′17″E	435	Fuel oil	1998–2001	Électricité du Liban
Deir Ammar	34°27′52″N 35°53′37″E	435	Fuel oil	1998–2002	Électricité du Liban
Jiyeh	33°38′50″N 35°23′58″E	346	Fuel oil	1970–1981	Électricité du Liban
Hreisheh	34°22′47″N 35°45′34″E	75	Fuel oil	1983	Électricité du Liban
Tyre	33°16′34″N 35°13′44″E	70	Fuel oil	1996	Électricité du Liban
Baalbek	34°01′15″N 36°11′30″E	70	Fuel oil	1996	Électricité du Liban
Ksara	33°49′18″N 35°53′54″E	217	Fuel oil	2015	Électricité de Zahlé

== Powerships ==
In May 2021, Turkish Karadeniz Powership Co. ceased supplying electricity to Lebanon. Karadeniz was the only powership operator in Lebanon, with the two ships listed in table below being the only powerships in Lebanon. Both ships have been moved away from Lebanon, so the table below is historic only.

Name of ship	Coordinates where moored	Capacity (MW)	Fuel	Years in service	Operator
MV Karadeniz Powership Fatmagül Sultan	33°58′20″N 35°36′07″E	203	Fuel oil / gas	2013-2021	Karpowership
MV Karadeniz Powership Orhan Bey	33°38′59″N 35°24′08″E	203	Fuel oil / gas	2013-2021	Karpowership

== Hydroelectric ==
Station	Coordinates	Capacity (MW)	Year commissioned	Operator
Al Awwali - Paul Arqash	33°34′32″N 35°30′30″E	108		Électricité du Liban
Joun - Charles Helou	33°34′35″N 35°25′53″E	48		Électricité du Liban
Markaba - Ibrahim Abdel Al	33°29′44″N 35°39′38″E	36		Électricité du Liban
Nahr el Bared 1 - Ouyoun es Samak	34°26′26″N 36°00′30″E	13.5		Électricité du Liban
Nahr el Bared 2 - Rawda	34°28′47″N 35°59′06″E	3.7		Électricité du Liban
Safa		13.4		Électricité du Liban
Blaouza		4.6	1961	Électricité de Kadicha
Mar Lisha		3.3		Électricité de Kadicha
Abou Ali		3	1932	Electricité de Kadicha
Bsharreh		1.6	1920	Electricité de Kadicha
Wadi el Aarayesh	33°51′58″N 35°53′08″E		1925	Electricité de Zahlé

== See also ==
- Energy in Lebanon
- List of largest power stations in the world
