= List of Lebanese Armenians =

This is a list of Lebanese-Armenians from Lebanon categorized by subject.

== Politics ==
- Khatchig Babikian - attorney, politician, member of Parliament, minister
- Laury Haytayan - civic activist
- Émile Lahoud - President of Lebanon
- Nazar Najarian - politician, former Secretary-General of the Kataeb Party
- Arthur Nazarian - politician, Member of Parliament
- Karim Pakradouni - politician, ex-Minister, former President of Phalange (Kataeb) Party
- Hagop Pakradounian - politician, Member of Parliament

== Arts ==
Media

- Zaven Kouyoumdjian - talk show host
- Paula Yacoubian - TV presenter

Music

- John Dolmayan - drummer of the American band System of a Down
- Adiss Harmandian - singer
- Guy Manoukian - composer, pianist
- Tigran Mansurian - composer, 2004 Grammy awards nominee
- Manuel Menengichian - singer
- Maria Nalbandian - singer
- Nourhanne - singer
- Haig Papazian - violinist in Lebanese indie rock band Mashrou' Leila
- George Pehlivanian - musician
- Nicole Saba - singer
- Serj Tankian - lead vocalist, songwriter, keyboardist of American band, System of a Down

Others

- Simon Abkarian - actor
- Krikor Agopian - painter
- Shaunt Basmajian - poet
- Pierre Chammassian - comedian
- Sylva Channessian - Miss Lebanon and Miss World Finalist 1973
- Ardashes Der-Khachadourian - linguist and editor
- Paul Guiragossian - painter
- Tulip Joshi - actress and model (Indian father, Lebanese-Armenian mother)
- Hovik Keuchkerian - actor and comedian
- Noura Kevorkian - writer, director, producer
- Mariam Nour - television personality

== Religion ==
- Aram I - Catholicoss of Great House of Cilicia

== Science ==
- Ardem Patapoutian - molecular biologist and neuroscientist, won Nobel Prize in Physiology or Medicine

== Sports ==
- Levon Altonian - former football player who played for Homenetmen and Lebanon
- Mardek Chabarian - former football player who played for Lebanon
- Agop Donabidian - former football player who played for Nejmeh and Lebanon
- Wartan Ghazarian - former football player who played for Lebanon
- Gretta Taslakian - sprinter, Olympian

== See also ==
- Armenians in Lebanon
- List of Armenian Catholicoi of Cilicia headquartered in Antelias, Lebanon
- List of Armenian Catholic Patriarchs of Cilicia headquartered in Beirut, Lebanon
