= 2021 Lebanon blackout =

Power outage in Lebanon

The 2021 Lebanon blackout was a power outage in Lebanon that started on 9 October 2021, after two of the country's power plants shut down when they ran out of diesel fuel. The two power stations provided 40% of Lebanon's electricity. Due to this, the power grid was shut down nationwide.

== Background ==
Because of the ongoing Lebanese liquidity crisis, the Lebanese pound lost over 90% of its value, leaving the government unable to pay for fuel imports, resulting in a general shortage of fuel in Lebanon, including for its power plants. The fuel shortage also meant that people and businesses could not run their private fuel-powered electricity generators.

== Outage ==
The power outage started on 9 October, after the Zahrani Power Station ran out of fuel. The day before, the Deir Ammar Power Station had also stopped running for the same reason. With both plants shut down, national power production was limited to 270 megawatts, making the grid severely unstable, so that the grid was shut down nationwide at noon that day. Power had not been expected to come back on for several days, although that turned out to be wrong.

On 10 October, Banque du Liban, Lebanon's central bank, released $100 million to the Lebanese Energy Ministry to enable it to import fuel. In the meantime, the Lebanese army delivered 6,000 kilolitres (1.6 million gallons) of diesel fuel to both of the two power plants, and power was restored that day, after 24 hours of the blackout.

== Protests ==
Protests took place in Halba outside the offices of Électricité du Liban, the state-owned power company, as well as protesters blocking roads with burning tires in Tripoli.

== See also ==
- Energy in Lebanon
- Energy crisis
- 2024 Lebanon blackout
