= Haytayan =

Haytayan is a surname. Notable people with the surname include:

- Céline Haytayan (fl. 2022), Canadian politician
- Laury Haytayan (born 1975), Lebanese oil and gas expert
