= Ali Hussein Barji =

Lebanese militant (died 2024)

- علي حسين برجي
- Died: 9 January 2024 (allegedly)
- Military career
- Allegiance: Hezbollah
- Conflicts: Syrian civil war; Israel–Hezbollah conflict (2023–present) †

Ali Hussein Barji (Arabic: علي حسين برجي; allegedly died on 9 January 2024) was a Lebanese militant and the commander of Hezbollah's aerial forces in southern Lebanon. He was reportedly killed by an Israeli airstrike in Khirbet Selm, Lebanon, during the 2023–2024 Israel–Hezbollah conflict.

== Military career ==
Barji played a key role in the development of Hezbollah's suicide drone system. During the Syrian civil war, he was one of the highest-ranking Hezbollah officials engaged in combat in the Idlib region. Barji orchestrated numerous drone attacks on Israeli forces during the 2023–2024 Israel–Hezbollah conflict. Notably, he orchestrated a strike on an Israeli airbase in Mount Meron on 6 January 2024, and targeted Israel's Northern Command headquarters in Safed on 9 January 2024.

== Death ==
On 9 January 2024, he was killed in an Israeli airstrike while attending the funeral of Wissam al-Tawil, another Hezbollah senior commander who had been killed the previous day. Israel stated that his killing was a response to the drone attack in Safed that had occurred earlier that day.
