= Energy in Lebanon =

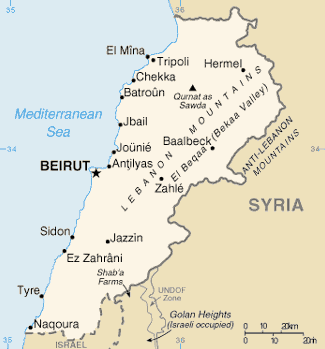
Map of Lebanon

Energy in Lebanon is dominated by oil, which represents more than 95% of the primary energy consumed in 2017. The great majority of energy used in the country is imported. The energy market in Lebanon is characterized by sharply rising consumption, and frequent shortages due to dilapidated infrastructure partly destroyed by the civil war that ravaged the country between 1975 and 1990.

Since the 1990s, however, major work has been undertaken by the public authorities to increase production, diversify the energy mix which is highly dependent on imported fossil fuels, and connect many households without access to electricity. The consumption of primary energy has thus increased by more than 4 times between 1990 and 2017, going from around 2 to more than 8 tonnes of oil equivalent over this period. But large gaps between generation capacity and electricity demand persist.

The primary energy use in 2009 in Lebanon was 77 TWh, 18 MWh per capita. In 2019, the total solar PV capacity was 78 MW, and it reached 1300 MW at the end of 2023.

== Overview ==
Energy in Lebanon
	Capita	Prim. energy	Production	Import	Electricity	CO_{2}-emission
	Million	TWh	TWh	TWh	TWh	Mt
2004	3.54	63	3	60	8.85	15.29
2007	4.10	46	2	46	8.97	11.35
2008	4.14	61	2	61	9.51	15.23
2009	4.22	77	2	78	13.14	19.33
Change 2004–2009	19%	23%	–26%	29%	48%	26%
Mtoe = 11.63 TWh, Prim. energy includes energy losses.

== History ==
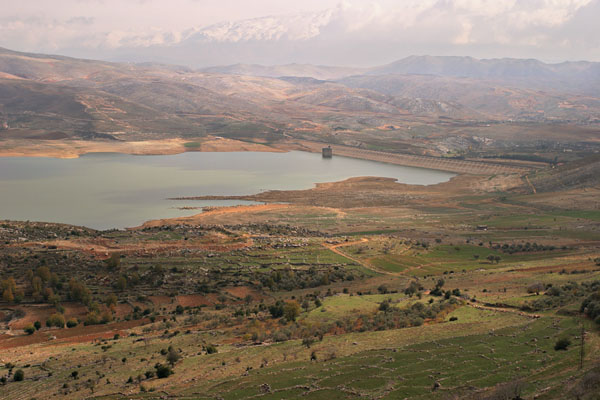
Qaraoun dam

Electricity in Lebanon was first introduced to power the capital city's tramways, managed by the Compagnie des Tramsways et de l'Electricite de Beyrouth, founded in 1906. In 1923, the latter merged with the Compagnie du Gaz et de l'Eclairage de Beyrouth, itself founded in 1895, to become la Societe des Tramways et de l'Electricite.

By 1952, an estimated 30 private companies provided electricity in different parts of the country.

Electricite du Liban, the public entity that currently is the country's primary provider, was founded in 1954, under the name Office d'Electricite et des Transports en Commun. Ensued a period during which the state invested massively in infrastructure, notably the first major thermoelectric plant, which started operating in 1956 in Zouk. The priority, however, was given to hydroelectric power generation, which in 1963 amounted to more than half of the country's total production of electricity. In particular, the government inaugurated in 1961 a vast artificial lake near Qaraoun, in the Beqaa, whose runoff was funnelled, via tunnels under Mount Lebanon, through a succession of three hydroelectric plants. Access to cheap fuel from Iraq and Saudi Arabia, combined with natural conditions largely unsuited to hydroelectric power, quickly led the country to favor thermoelectric plants.

Although Electricite du Liban dominates the electricity market since the latter's nationalization in 1964, it coexists with independent entities running the hydropower plants on the Litani, Nahr Ibrahim, and Bared rivers, as well as distribution concessions in the towns of Zahle, Jbeil, Aley, and Bhamdoun.

== Electricity ==
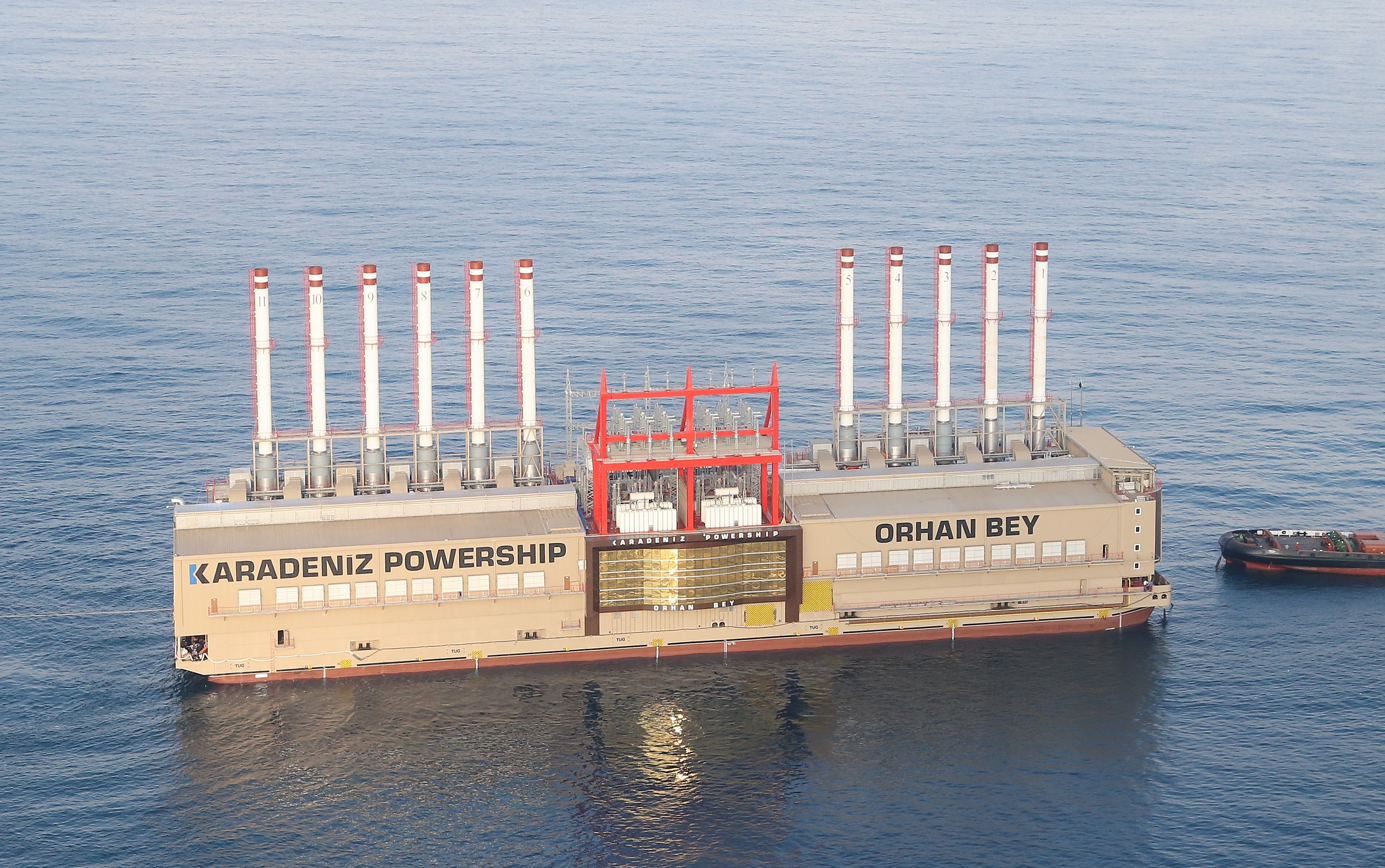
Thermoelectric barge

As of August 2016, electricity generation capacity in Lebanon still did not meet the country's needs. The peak electricity demand in the country in 2020 was 3,500 MW, but the total grid capacity was only 2,200 MW. The country suffers frequent blackouts, and many households and businesses rely on private diesel generators for electricity. Domestic electricity is delivered at 230 V 50 Hz.

In May 2021, Turkish Karpowership, which provided Lebanon with 370 megawatts (MW) at a cost of $850 million per year, ceased supplying electricity due to payment arrears of $100 million, and legal threats to its two barges, MV Karadeniz Powership Fatmagül Sultan and MV Karadeniz Powership Orhan Bey.

Arab Gas Pipeline route

In August 2021, Lebanese president announced a plan to divert its natural gas from Egypt to Jordan to produce electricity there to be added to the Lebanese grid via Syria.

There was a power blackout throughout Lebanon in October 2021 after Lebanon's two largest power stations—the Zahrani and the Deir Ammar power stations—were shut down due to fuel shortages, leaving Lebanon with no centrally generated electricity, and not enough fuel for private electricity generators. Power was restored the next day, after the Lebanese army delivered fuel out of its reserves.

=== Solar power ===
A major support for the expansion of solar energy in Lebanon is the Net Metering policy which has been adopted and approved by the Électricité du Liban (EDL). Its advantages include legal and technical simplicity, in addition to the free installation of meters by EDL.

Up until 2020 Lebanon had 100MW of total solar PV capacity. In 2021, another 100MW were added. In 2022, 250MW were added to bring the total solar PV capacity to 450MW. All of this capacity was added by citizens and companies investing in off-grid solar PV systems.

== Gas ==
The Arab Gas Pipeline is a natural gas pipeline exporting Egyptian natural gas to Jordan, Syria and Lebanon, with a separate line to Israel. Regular gas supplies started on 19 October 2009 with the gas being delivered to the Deir Ammar power station. In August 2021, Lebanon announced a plan to divert its natural gas to Jordan to produce electricity to be added to the Lebanese grid via Syria.

== See also ==
- List of power stations in Lebanon
- Trans-Arabian Pipeline
- Renewable energy by country
- MV Karadeniz Powership Orhan Bey
