= Électricité du Liban =

- Founded: July,1964

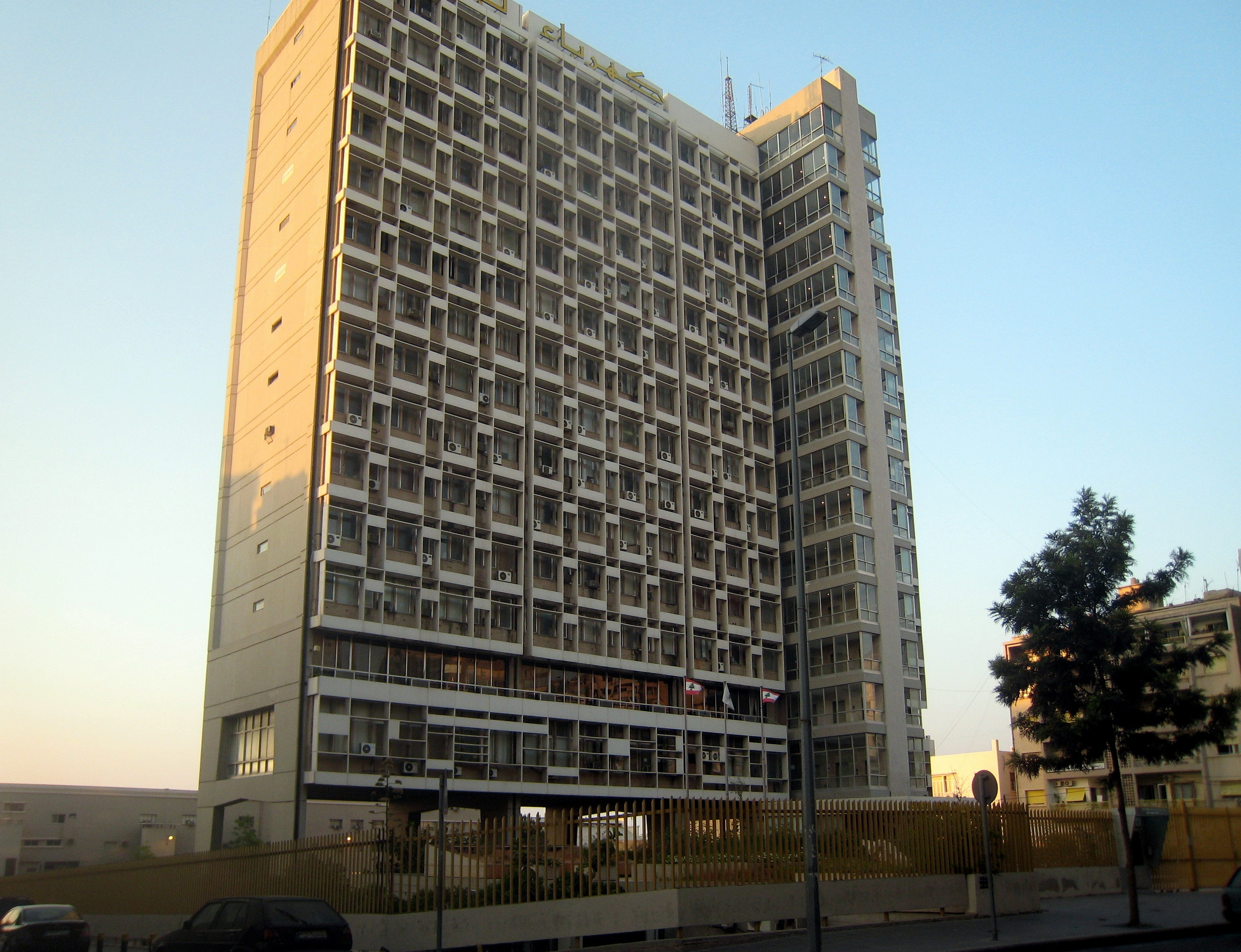
EDL corporate headquarters, Beirut, before destruction in 2020

Électricité du Liban (Electricity of Lebanon; EDL) is a public industrial and commercial establishment in Lebanon which controls 90% of the country's electricity production, transmission and distribution activities.

== History ==
=== Ottoman Gas Company of Beirut (1908) ===
In 1908, the Société Ottomane du Gaz de Beyrouth distributed electricity in the city of Beirut, replaced by the Société d'Électricité de Beyrouth in 1923, a company incorporated under French law. Before 1939, the company operated a 4,500 kW diesel power plant and a 6,400 kW hydraulic plant. In March 1954, the Lebanese State bought the Beirut Electricity Company, which became the Electricity Office. The Zouk power station went into production in 1956.

At the end of the Second World War, Lebanon produced 80 MW in 1948, 280 MW in 1957, and 692 MW in 1964. Electricity was produced by private and disparate production units. The Qaraoun dam was commissioned in 1961.

=== Office of Electricity of Lebanon (1964) ===
The Office of Electricity of Lebanon (Électricité du Liban, EDL) was created in July 1964, and was granted a monopoly of the production, transport and distribution of electricity in Lebanon. Until the 1975-1990 Lebanese Civil War, the EDL provided normal distribution, and even distributed electricity to Syria. Until the early 1980s, including the first years of the conflict, the EDL remained profitable and self-financed its development projects.

=== Since 1990s ===
In the 1990s the management of the company began to crumble, to the point of getting rid of its accounting department in 2001. When the conflicts emerged, the infrastructure was not upgraded. In 1975 EDL had 5,000 employees, which was reduced to 2,500 by 2009. The 2006 Israeli-Lebanese conflict affected EDL production plants. A daily 3-hour load shedding was implemented. In response to that, small companies have emerged, providing households with expensive privately generated electricity during the daily rationing period.

In June 2010, the Minister of Energy Gebran Bassil announced that from 2014-2015 load shedding will cease by increasing production capacity from 1,685 MW in 2011 to 5,000 MW in 2015. In 2020, however, the reforms were still blocked, and the country's production capacity did not exceed 3,000 MW.

==== Lebanese Crisis ====
In July 2020, due to the country's severe economic crisis resulting in Central Bank's failure to pay fuel shipments, EDL was forced to reduce production drastically. A harsh rationing schedule was defined, leaving the country with only a few hours of centrally produced electricity per day.

On 4 August 2020, following a huge double explosion at the port of Beirut, EDL's headquarters located near the port was completely destroyed, as well as the control center of the national grid it housed. The explosion caused the death of several people inside the building. Control of the national network was transferred to Bsalim and temporarily carried out manually. Following this disaster, Central Bank committed itself to pay all fuel shipments to ensure almost round-the-clock electricity production, for a few months only.

In May 2021, Turkish Karpowership, which provided Lebanon with 370 megawatts (MW) at a cost of $850 million per year, ceased supplying electricity due to payment arrears and legal threats to its two barges, MV Karadeniz Powership Fatmagül Sultan and MV Karadeniz Powership Orhan Bey.

Beginning June 2021, EDL was again forced to cut off production, averaging electricity supply to less than 4 daily hours. EDL warned several times that total backout was imminent.

There was a power blackout throughout Lebanon in October 2021 after Lebanon’s two largest power stations—the Zahrani and the Deir Ammar power stations—were shut down due to fuel shortages, leaving Lebanon with no centrally generated electricity, and not enough fuel for private electricity generators.

Despite promises that centrally generated electricity supply will reach 12 daily hours "soon", households are not getting more than a few hours of it every day (currently four hours a day, in Beirut, as of November 27, 2021).

On 17 August 2024, Électricité du Liban (EDL) made a public statement announcing that it had completely used up all its fuel reserves, forcing all of its power plants to shut down power generating operations as a result. As a result, the company reported that beginning at noon EEST, there would be an indefinite and complete black out in all territories of Lebanon which would impact “essential facilities such as the airport, port, water pumps, sewage systems, and prisons”. Regions cut off from electricity included several fundamental institutions of Lebanon, which included the Port of Beirut and the Beirut–Rafic Hariri International Airport. Fadi Al-Hassan, the Director General of Civil Aviation at the Beirut Airport, stated that the airport was forced to use generators to provide electrical power.

== Privatisation ==
Electricity reform continues to be a major political issue in Lebanon. In 2002, international donors at the Paris II conference pledged to provide finance to the electricity sector in Lebanon on condition of structural reforms. A law providing for the privatisation of the electricity sector was adopted in 2002, at the initiative of the Hariri government. However, the reforms were never implemented.

In 2010, Minister of Energy Gebran Bassil launched another reform plan focusing on increasing production capacity, and providing for delegating collection and distribution to the private sector, which was done in 2012. The plan provoked daily protests by employees in the sector, 70% of whom (i.e. 2,000 workers) had been made redundant. Controversies over the financing of new investments, the technological options to be favored, the choice of companies, the acceptance of works, the partial privatization of production had considerably delayed the implementation of the plan and power cuts continued.

== See also ==
- Energy in Lebanon
