= Mariam Nour =

Lebanese television personality (born 1936)

- مريم نور
- Born: Marie-Noëlle Yeghiayan; May 24, 1936 (age 90); Douma, Lebanon
- Citizenship: American, Lebanese
- Occupation: TV Personality

Mariam Nour (Arabic: مريم نور, born May 24, 1936) is a Lebanese television personality and author, who discusses food and lifestyle issues in the Lebanese and Arab media, and an expert in the Macrobiotic diet and alternative medicine.

== Life and career ==
Nour was born in Douma, Lebanon as Marie Manuel Yeghiayan to an Armenian father and Lebanese mother, she mentioned that Musa al-Sadr had named her as Mariam Nour.

She traveled to the United States where she was taught by Osho and Michio Kushi. She survived hereditary breast cancer as she healed herself naturally.

With her return to Lebanon in the late 1990s, Nour brought new age ideas to the Arab world. She presented many programs on the Lebanese Al Jadeed (New TV) station and appeared at various times on Al Jazeera Arabic and other Arab stations promoting her views and lifestyle. Nour is a dual citizen of Lebanon and the United States.

== See also ==
- List of Lebanese Armenians
- Armenians in Lebanon
- Armenian diaspora
