= Souaneh =

- Town
- Interactive map of Souaneh
- Country: Lebanon
- Governorate: Nabatieh Governorate

Souaneh (Arabic: صوانة) is a village located in southern Lebanon, within the Marjayoun District of the Nabatieh Governorate. Geographically, it is situated at approximately 33.2336°N latitude and 35.439°E longitude, with an elevation of about 547 meters (1,795 feet) above sea level. Souaneh has an area of 4,969 km². The village is in proximity to other localities, including Tebnine, Touline, and Khorbet Selm.

== Demographics ==
Souaneh has a predominantly Shiite Muslim population, consistent with the demographic composition of the Marjayoun District. In 2014, voter registration data indicated that 99.69% of registered voters were Muslim, with 98.43% identifying as Shiite Muslims.

Souaneh has a population of approximately 2,937 people, with a median age of 28.2 years. The community has historically relied on agriculture, small businesses, and trade as key economic activities.

Souaneh is home to several prominent families, including Al Amin, Ftouni, Hamadeh, Basal, El Hawe, Mouzannar, Sultan... many of whom have deep historical and social ties to the region. In recent decades, migration has influenced the village's demographics, with many families having members who have settled in West Africa, South America, and the Gulf states, contributing to the local economy through remittances.

== Administration ==
Souaneh does not have an established municipal government and is instead administered by a local Mukhtar.
