= Laury Haytayan =

Lebanese journalist

- Born: 13 October 1975 (age 50); Antelias, Lebanon
- Education: Lebanese American University; University of Exeter

Laury Haytayan is a Lebanese oil and gas expert in the Middle East and North Africa. Since 2011, she has been leading the parliamentary capacity development portfolio at the Natural Resource Governance Institute (NRGI) in the MENA region, focusing on the legislative and oversight roles of Arab parliamentarians in advancing reforms in the Middle East Oil and Gas sector.

== Personal life ==
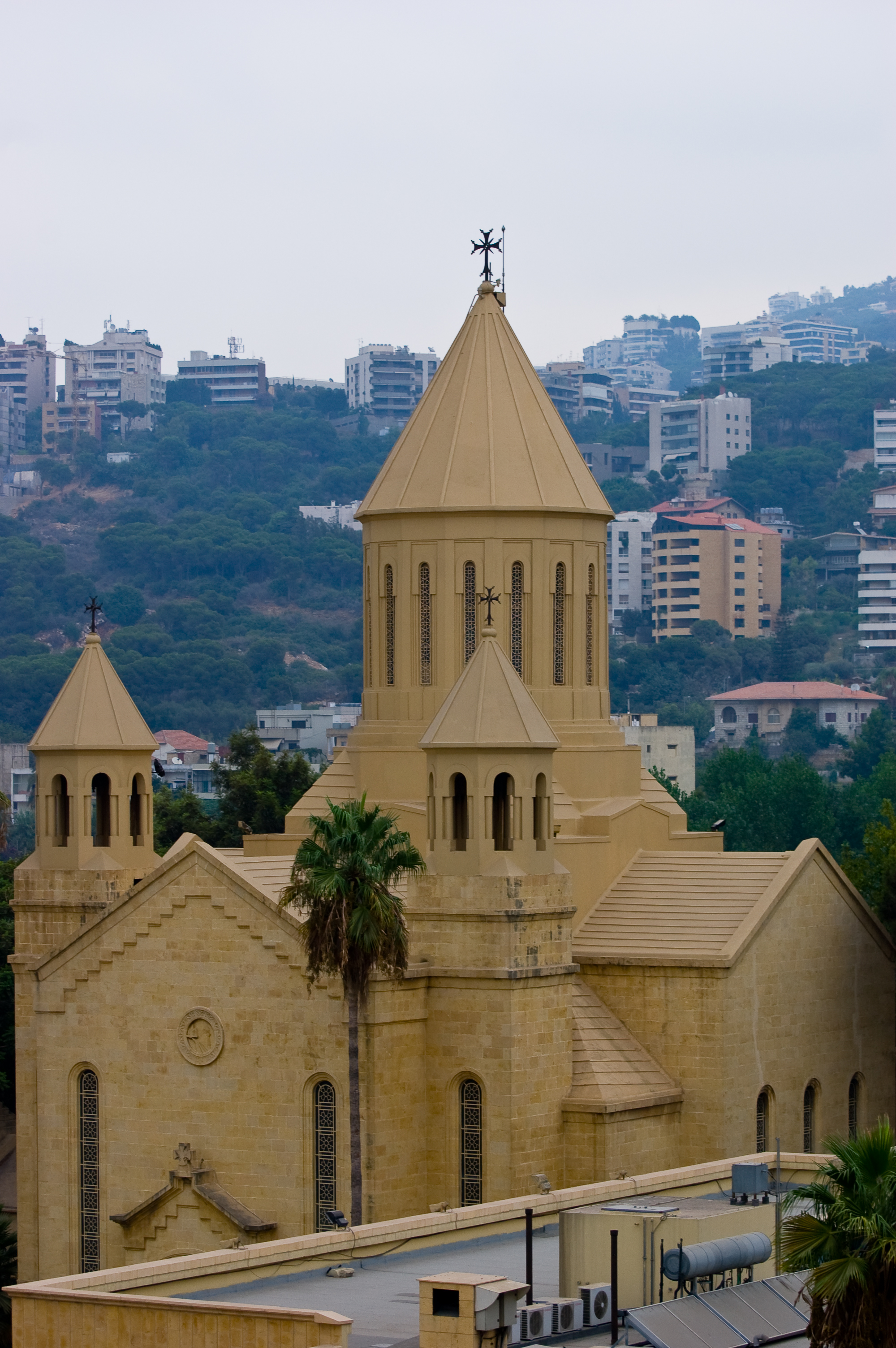
Antelias

Laury Haytayan was born to Armenian parents Garabed and Mayram Haytayan on 13 October 1975, exactly six months after the start of the Lebanese Civil War. She was born and raised in Antelias, a town on the coast of the Metn District in the Mount Lebanon Governorate.

Haytayan pursued her bachelor's degree of arts in Communication Design from the Lebanese American University in Ras Beirut. The area was earlier restricted to Christians.

She later earned a master's degree in 'Middle East Politics' from the University of Exeter in Devon, United Kingdom. Laury later shifted her focus to the Oil and Gas Sector in Lebanon, as a means for national development and peace building.

She speaks Arabic, English, French and Armenian.

== Career life ==
Haytayan is the MENA Senior Officer at the Natural Resource Governance Institute (NRGI). This was formerly the Revenue Watch Institute, a framework of the Natural Resource Charter. She leads both regional parliamentary and media programs and was involved in the development of a MENA extractive industries knowledge hub. Prior to joining NRGI, Haytayan was the executive director of Arab Region Parliamentarians Against Corruption (ARPAC), a chapter within the Global Organization of Parliamentarians Against Corruption. She worked with parliamentarians from Arab parliament, developing strategies and action plans to strengthen the oversight and legislative capacities of parliamentarians to promote accountability and transparency.

Previously, she was in charge of regional grass root projects focused on promoting the role of women in development and policy making in several GCC countries, specifically in Bahrain, Yemen and Saudi Arabia. She also worked as grant manager, advocacy specialist and trainer for several international NGOs, including International Research and Exchanges Board (IREX), Agricultural Cooperative Development International/Volunteers in Overseas Cooperative Assistance (ACDI/VOCA), and Economic and Social Commission for Western Asia (ESCWA), focusing mainly on civil society democracy campaigns in Lebanon and Iraq.

She was invited by the Carter Center for the Election monitoring of the Tunisian parliamentary elections in 2011, the first elections following the Tunisian Revolution and the ousting of Zine El Abidine Ben Ali.

Since 2004, Haytayan started working with different stakeholders such as youth, women, devastated communities and parliamentarians to build "pro-active" societies, and to promote a culture of accountability and transparency, and rule of law in public spheres and institutions.

Haytayan received the Gold Shield of Excellence Award by the Arab Women Council in 2014 for her role in promoting social responsibility.

Haytayan was honored on International Women's Day in 2015 by the Green Party of Lebanon for her work in supporting the participation of women in politics.

In 2013 she ran for parliamentary elections in the Armenian Orthodox seat in Beirut. She also ran in the 2018 Lebanese parliamentary elections. In 2025 she teaches geopolitics at the American University of Beirut. She also hosts a podcast and a monthly webinar on energy transition.

== Publications ==
- "Beirut", Cities of the Middle East and North Africa: A Historical Encyclopedia, edited by Michael Dumper & Bruce Stanley, December 2006 (English)
- "Ohanes Pacha", Nairi Armenian Periodical, December 2008 (Arabic)
- "What Unites Us", Nairi Armenian Periodical, December 2009 (Arabic)
- "Armenian Christians in Jerusalem: 1700 years of Peaceful Presence", Politics and Religion Journal, Volume V (No.2), autumn 2011 (English)

== Articles ==
Haytayan was featured in the Moscow-based news agency Interfax discussing Lebanon's energy sector. She was quoted saying "Currently, I am not optimistic at all. A system that is incapable to deal with its rubbish is unable to manage a hydrocarbon sector. According to the 3D seismic survey offshore Lebanon, there is great potential. However, the risks in Lebanon are very high, which puts [the country] in a weak position vis-a-vis the companies. The government needs to show real interest in institutional reforms before anything else."

Haytayan was interviewed by the Voice of America about the challenges and opportunities of oil and gas discoveries in Lebanon, she says: "This goes beyond oil and gas, the sector could be used to rebuild trust in the government"

Haytayan was interviewed by Executive Magazine about the importance of Beneficial Ownership in the oil and gas sector and especially in Lebanon. She is quoted saying: In many cases throughout the global oil and gas industry those companies bidding for - and sometimes winning - petroleum contracts have close ties to the government through connections that influence the award. These companies can mask the identity of their ownership: "They’re hiding behind companies and law firms, behind shell companies or even entities that do not exist" In another interview with the same magazine, she spoke on how civil society can already begin preparing for potential EITI implementation in Lebanon. "Civil society has to get together and they have to elect representatives" who will eventually be part of the MSG, she says. "If you don’t have representatives from civil society, you cannot start with the EITI because you don’t have the major body [the MSG] running the whole initiative." She also wrote an article for the magazine about the Extractive Industries Transparency Initiative (EITI) and how it could benefit a country such as Lebanon

Haytayan was interviewed by L’Orient Le Jour after receiving the Golden Award from the Arab Women Council in Dubai, for her achievement in “Social Accountability. In this interview she stressed on the need to have women role models in the region to encourage young ladies and women to pursue a career in difficult domains such as politics and public affairs”

During an interview with NOW News, she said: The more Civil Society is informed, better it will be able to advocate for a more transparent and accountable process, building the capacity and technical expertise is crucial especially the sector is not developed yet. NGOs will need to advocate for open bidding, for publishing contracts, for the need to make the fiscal terms known.

She was interviewed by iloubnan on the eve of the first parliamentary extension in May 2013, and said: It's a bullet in democracy for Lebanon.

== Television Interviews ==
- Haytayan was interviewed on LBCI’s "naharkonsaid" to discuss the parliamentary elections of May 2013 and her program as candidate (2013) Video on YouTube
- Haytayan was interviewed on Al Jadeed with Georges Salibi in "Esbou3 fi Saa'a" to discuss her program as a candidate for parliamentary elections and her views on Lebanon's current affairs. (19 October 2014)
- Haytayan was interviewed with Shada Omar on "Kalima Horra" on Télé Liban to discuss the second extension of the Lebanese parliament in November 2014. She was the guest of the program along with MPs Walid Khoury and Joseph Maalouf (November 2014) Video on YouTube
- Haytayan was interviewed on Al Jazeera English to discuss the oil and gas sector in Lebanon. Haytayan said, "We are happy it has stopped for now. Initially, everything was moving at a very fast pace. The vast majority of people didn't know anything about the sector, and so could not hold the government accountable; plus, we need to know how to manage people's expectations."
- Haytayan made an appearance in August 2015 on the pan-Arab news website "Arab Economic News", where she discussed the gas sector in both Cyprus and Israel, and how Lebanon could learn from their experience.

== See also ==
- Zaven Kouyoumdjian
- Natural Resource Charter
- ESCWA
- Armenians in Lebanon
