= Yamli =

Arabic transliteration and search engine

- Type: Start-up
- Industry: Internet, Search Engine
- Founded: 2007
- Headquarters: Cambridge, United States
- Key people: Habib Haddad; Imad Jureidini
- Website: http://www.yamli.com

Yamli.com (Arabic: يملي yamlī, "[he] dictates") is an Arabic transliteration and smart search engine that enables users to type Arabic words phonetically using Latin characters. Founded in 2006 by Habib Haddad and Imad Jureidini, Yamli introduced one of the first web-based, real-time transliteration engines powered by a probabilistic language model. The service quickly became popular among Arabic speakers accustomed to writing in Arabizi (informal Arabic in Latin script).

== History ==
Before Yamli's launch, most transliteration tools were static, rule-based input methods installed locally or limited to academic use. Yamli's web-based system was among the first to apply adaptive, statistical modeling to transliteration, predicting the most likely Arabic word from ambiguous Latin input and improving accuracy through user interaction. This approach preceded similar technologies later developed by larger platforms such as Google Input Tools and paved the way for modern predictive typing systems for complex scripts.

== Products ==
=== Smart Arabic keyboard ===
Yamli's Smart Arabic Keyboard was launched in November 2007. It allowed users to type Arabic by spelling their words phonetically using Latin characters. The real time transliteration engine is designed to be:

- flexible to accept many different input spellings for the same output word.
- accurate to allow the user to type quickly without the need for constant corrections.
- adaptive to learn from the input patterns and dialects of the users

It is also possible for other websites and blogs to use Yamli's typing technology through a free JavaScript API. The Arabic Keyboard API allows a website publisher to easily convert text input fields to accept Arabic input in Latin form.

=== Yamli search ===
Arabic and Arabic dialects content on the web exists in two forms: in Arabic Script and in Latin phonetic representations (Arabic Chat Alphabet). Finding relevant content for an Arabic query on a traditional search engine can be difficult because it requires trying many Latin variations of that query. Yamli Search seeks to address this problem by expanding an Arabic search query to its most frequently used Latin spellings. The search query is forwarded to a traditional search engine, returning a larger number of relevant results than the original query would have.

The following are examples of Latin query expansions automatically performed by Yamli Search:

- محمد بن راشد: Mohammed Bin Rashid, Mohamad Ben Rached, Mo7amed Bn Rachid, etc. ...
- حبيبي يا نور العين: Habibi ya nor el ein, 7abibi ya noor el 3ayn, etc. ...

Yamli Search queries are forwarded to Google for web and news, Wikipedia for encyclopedic searches, Bing for image searches and YouTube for movie and video searches.

== History ==
Yamli's typing technology originated during the July 2006 war in Lebanon, when co-founder Habib Haddad was looking for news about the war online. Without access to an Arabic keyboard and not being used to one, Haddad had difficulties finding up-to-date information, which is generally first available in Arabic. After working on prototypes of an Arabic transliteration engine for several months, Haddad, along with co-founder Imad Jureidini, founded Language Analytics LLC in July 2007. In November 2007, Language Analytics launched Yamli.com, featuring the Smart Arabic Keyboard to allow users to type Arabic without an Arabic keyboard, as well as a basic search engine front end to Google. This first search engine did not include the expanded query capabilities of Yamli Arabic Search. The typing technology was made to third-party websites in March 2008 in the form of a free API. The search engine was updated to include the query expansion capabilities in December 2008.

== Timeline ==
- Language Analytics LLC founded in July 2007
- Yamli.com launched on November 15, 2007
- Arabic keyboard API beta released in March 2008
- Arabic keyboard API officially launched on October 8, 2008.
- Yamli Arabic Search launched on December 15, 2008

== Awards ==
Yamli has won the "Best Web Technology Award" at the "Pan Arab Web Awards 2008", and the audience choice award at the WebInnovatorsGroup 17. Yamli founder Habib Haddad was featured on the World Economic Forum's 2009 Young Global Leader List.

== Competition ==
1. Yabhath

2. clavierarabehub Retrieved 2021-12-18.
