= Majdal Selem =

Majdal Selem مجدل سلم
- Municipality
- Location within Lebanon
- Coordinates: 33°13′18″N 35°27′52″E
- Grid position: 193/291 PAL
- Country: Lebanon
- Governorate: Nabatieh Governorate
- District: Marjayoun District

Area
  - Total: 12.05 km^{2} (4.65 sq mi)
- Elevation: 560 m (1,840 ft)
- Time zone: UTC+2 (EET)
  - Summer (DST): UTC+3 (EEST)
- Dialing code: +961

Majdal Selem (Arabic: مجدل سلم) is a municipality in the Marjayoun District in Southern Lebanon.

== Etymology ==
According to E. H. Palmer, the name Majdal Islim means Islim's watch-tower, p.n.

Kherbet Selem means Fortress of Peace, or Peace Fortress.

== History ==
In 1596, it was named as a village, Majdal Salim, in the Ottoman nahiya (subdistrict) of Tibnin under the Liwa Safad, with a population of 51 households and 8 bachelors, all Muslim. The villagers paid a fixed tax-rate of 25 % on agricultural products, such as wheat, barley, olive trees, fruit trees, vegetable and fruit garden, orchard, goats, beehives, in addition to "occasional revenues" and a press for olive oil or grape syrup; a total of 9,110 akçe.

In 1875, Victor Guérin found that the village had about 300 Metawileh inhabitants. He further noted: "A mosque, now abandoned and falling into ruins, has succeeded here a Byzantine church, the materials of which have been used in building it. Over one of the windows is a stone (apparently once the lintel) with an old Greek inscription, the characters of which are too much defaced to be read. A monolithic column lies beside it, half buried in the ground, surmounted by a capital sculptured in form of open basket work."

In 1881, the PEF's Survey of Western Palestine (SWP) described it as a "large village, built of stone, of ancient appearance, containing about 500 [..] Metawileh [..]. Situated on table land, surrounded by olives and arable land. Water supply from a large masonry birket and many cisterns." They further noted: "Village containing several good lintels and remains of ruins; an ancient road leads from the village to the Birkeh."

On 15 February 1993, the village was attacked by Israeli helicopter gunships following an attack on SLA positions earlier in the day. During the 1996 Israeli seventeen day bombardment of south Lebanon the Nepalese UNIFIL position in Majdal Selem was hit by eight shells and extensively damaged.

On 5 December 1997, three civilians were killed by a roadside bomb. The bomb was believed to have been planted by an Israeli commando special unit. Including this event forty-three civilians had been killed in southern Lebanon in 1997.

On 8 January 2024, Israeli forces killed Wissam al-Tawil, the deputy commander of Hezbollah's Redwan Force, in an airstrike against his vehicle in Majdal Selem. . Following the 2026 conflict with Israel, Hezbollah buried 39 of is fighters in a mass funeral alongside 4 civilians killed during the war .

== Demographics ==
In 2014 Muslims made up 99.61% of registered voters in Majdal Selem. 99.37% of the voters were Shiite Muslims.

== Bibliography ==
- Conder, C.R.; Kitchener, H.H. (1881). The Survey of Western Palestine: Memoirs of the Topography, Orography, Hydrography, and Archaeology. Vol. 1. London: Committee of the Palestine Exploration Fund.
- Guérin, V. (1880). Description Géographique Historique et Archéologique de la Palestine (in French). Vol. 3: Galilee, pt. 2. Paris: L'Imprimerie Nationale.
- Hütteroth, W.-D.; Abdulfattah, K. (1977). Historical Geography of Palestine, Transjordan and Southern Syria in the Late 16th Century. Erlanger Geographische Arbeiten, Sonderband 5. Erlangen, Germany: Vorstand der Fränkischen Geographischen Gesellschaft. ISBN 3-920405-41-2.
- Palmer, E.H. (1881). The Survey of Western Palestine: Arabic and English Name Lists Collected During the Survey by Lieutenants Conder and Kitchener, R. E. Transliterated and Explained by E.H. Palmer. Committee of the Palestine Exploration Fund.
- Rhode, H. (1979). Administration and Population of the Sancak of Safed in the Sixteenth Century. Columbia University. Archived from the original on 2016-10-10.
