= 2024 Lebanon blackout =

Nationwide power outage

- Part of Lebanese liquidity crisis
- Date: 17 August 2024 – End of August 2024
- Time: 12:00 p.m. (EEST)
- Location: Lebanon (nationwide)
- Type: Power outage
- Cause: Fuel shortages, inability to pay Iraq for fuel
- Outcome: Complete shutdown of essential institutions

The 2024 Lebanon blackout was a total nationwide power outage across Lebanon that began on 17 August 2024 due to the state electricity company of Lebanon, Électricité du Liban, running out of fuel reserves for its power plants. The blackout led to widespread water shortages due to the inability of Lebanese water corporations to pump water in effective amounts, as well as the halting of several fundamental institutions across Lebanon, including, wastewater treatment systems, ports, airports, and prisons.

== Background ==
The great majority of energy used in Lebanon is imported. The energy market in Lebanon is characterized by sharply rising consumption, and frequent shortages due to dilapidated infrastructure partly destroyed by the civil war that ravaged the country between 1975 and 1990.

There was a power blackout throughout Lebanon in October 2021 after Lebanon's two largest power stations—the Zahrani and the Deir Ammar power stations—were shut down due to fuel shortages, leaving Lebanon with no centrally generated electricity, and not enough fuel for private electricity generators. Power was restored the next day, after the Lebanese army delivered fuel out of its reserves.

Due to the Lebanese government's inability to procure enough money to pay for foreign fuel imports from states such as Iraq, the amount of electricity produced for the nation has significantly decreased, causing the frequency of power outages across Lebanon to increase.

The economic crisis came in conjunction with increasing military activity between Israel and Hezbollah, with an Israeli strike on 17 August killing ten Syrian nationals just before the beginning of the blackout.

== Blackout ==
On 17 August 2024, Électricité du Liban (EDL) made a public statement announcing that it had completely used up all its fuel reserves, forcing all of its power plants to shut down power generating operations as a result. As a result, the company reported that beginning at noon EEST, there would be an indefinite and complete black out in all territories of Lebanon which would impact “essential facilities such as the airport, port, water pumps, sewage systems, and prisons.” Regions cut off from electricity included several fundamental institutions of Lebanon, which included the Port of Beirut and the Beirut–Rafic Hariri International Airport. Fadi Al-Hassan, the Director General of Civil Aviation at Beirut Airport, stated that the airport was forced to use generators to provide electrical power. Lebanese officials claimed that the blackout would last between 24 and 48 hours.

The last power plant providing energy for the Lebanese electrical grid was the Zahrani power plant in Southern Lebanon, which was forced to shut off production and release a statement reporting that it had drained all of its fuel resources after using up all measures to limit fuel consumption and extend electricity production. Contrary to the estimated 24 to 48 hour return of power expressed by the Lebanese government, officials of the Zahrani power plant did not give an estimated timeline for when power would be restored, and in what stages.

EDL stated that in addition to the ongoing economic crisis, increasing military activity and cross-border shelling between Israel and Hezbollah was implied to have contributed to the shortage of fuel due to its use in operations against Israel.

Following the initial announcement, the South Lebanon Water Corporation issued a statement declaring it critical for Lebanese citizens to limit water use and to save water due to the blackout preventing the corporation from being able to pump enough water to fill the needs of the nation. Energy Minister Walid Fayyad assigned EDL together with the Litani River Authority toward allocating all remaining resources and services towards providing as much water supply as possible.

Writers from Crisis24 stated that the blackouts potentially resulted in widespread disruptions in traffic and automotive transport due to non-functional traffic lights, shutdowns of filling stations and ATMs nationwide, disruptions in Lebanese business practices, and shutdowns in security measures such as electric fences and alarm networks that could significantly increase the prevalence of opportunistic looting, vandalism, trespassing, and other forms of criminal activity. The writers also remarked on the possibility of widespread demonstrations against the government if the blackout continued for an extended period of time.

In a telephone interview, Fayyad stated that the nation had agreed to receive fuel shipments from Egypt, which he stated would arrive by 23 August.

== Responses ==
Lebanese Forces MP Razi al-Hajj harshly criticized the fact that forty billion USD– amounting to almost half of Lebanon's US$100 billion in public debt– had been pushed into the energy sector with the intention of providing 24-hour electricity to the nation just to end up with a total blackout. He blamed Lebanese government officials for consistently pursuing short-term solutions and never trying to determine and fix the root causes of the nation's chronic energy scarcity, and stated that decentralization of the Lebanese energy sector would solve these issues.

The Lebanese Minister of Energy accused the Banque du Liban of causing the blackout due to not being able to pay Iraq for fuel imports, while the bank in turn accused parliament of not granting it the authorization to do so. Acting Central Bank Governor Wassim Mansouri stated that the bank had been limited to paying for fuel imports with emergency reserves in foreign currency, which he asserted needed parliamentary authorization to conduct. MP Sagih Atieh accused EDL of “failing to collect taxes. This is the direct reason for the crisis” resulting in EDL not having enough funds to pay for Iraqi fuel imports in addition to other institutions not paying necessary dues to keep the energy sector functional.

=== International ===
Algeria: Algerian Prime Minister Nadir Larbaoui told Najib Mikati during a phone call that Lebanon will be immediately supplied with quantities of fuel to help overcome the crisis.

Iraq: Concurrent with the blackout, Iraq declined to renew its contract to give Lebanon fuel in exchange for services due to financial concerns, specifically regarding the decision of the Banque du Liban against approving a $700 million credit line in order to keep Lebanon within the limits of the agreement. Prime Minister of Lebanon Najib Mikati attempted to convince Iraq to waive its debt of US$700 million from the initial which included a visit to Baghdad, which was declined. Prime Minister of Iraq Mohammed Shia' Al Sudani stated that he would renew the agreement with another US$700 million added onto the original debt, which would cause the debt owed to Iraq by Lebanon to double to US$1.4 billion. This proposal was declined by the Banque du Liban.

== See also ==
- 2021 Lebanon blackout
- 2024 Venezuela blackouts
- 2024 Cuba blackout
