= Natural Resource Charter =

The Natural Resource Charter is a global initiative to assist governments and societies of countries rich in non-renewable natural resources to effectively govern those resources in a way that generates economic growth, promotes the welfare of the population and is environmentally sustainable.

The Charter is made up of 12 best practice principles, which cover the sequence of choices faced by governments in relation to resource extraction. These range from how to create the right environment for responsible investment, to fiscal terms, contracts, institutions and regulations, to macroeconomic management and strategies for sustainable development.

The Natural Resource Charter has also developed an assessment framework, allowing governments and societies to assess their performance in natural resource governance according to the 12 precepts. In 2012 this assessment framework was piloted in Nigeria by a group of Nigerian civil society specialists on the petroleum sector, leading to the publication of an assessment report with traffic light scoring according to the precepts of the Charter.

In 2011 the Charter was adopted by the African Union Heads of State steering committee for the New Partnership for Africa's Development as a flagship Natural Resource Governance Programme starting in 2012.

== History ==
The Charter document was initially written by a group of leading experts on natural resource governance including Paul Collier, Michael Spence, Robert Conrad and Anthony Venables amongst other senior economists, lawyers and political scientists. It received input from a range of stakeholders during a 12-month public consultation prior to the launch of the Charter in 2010. A second edition was published by the Natural Resource Governance Institute in 2014, with drafting led by Jim Cust and David Manley.

== People ==
The Natural Resource Charter is led by an oversight board chaired by former Mexican president Ernesto Zedillo, and joined by Abdulatif Al-Hamad, Luisa Diogo, Mo Ibrahim, and Shengman Zhang.

The work of the Charter secretariat and updates to the document were guided by a Technical Advisory Group of international experts, chaired by Michael Spence.
