= Falak, Fars =

Falak فلك
- Village
- Location within Iran
- Coordinates: 30°03′46″N 52°24′15″E
- Country: Iran
- Province: Fars
- County: Sepidan
- Bakhsh: Beyza
- Rural District: Banesh

Population (2006)
  - Total: 147
- Time zone: UTC+3:30 (IRST)
  - Summer (DST): UTC+4:30 (IRDT)

Falak (Persian: فلك; also known as Fūlak) is a village in Banesh Rural District, Beyza District, Sepidan County, Fars province, Iran. At the 2006 census, its population was 147, in 37 families.
