= Yeprem and Martha Philibosian Armenian Evangelical College =

- Beirut, Beirut; Lebanon

Information
- Type: Private
- Established: 1923
- Principal: Armen Urneshlian
- Grades: Kindergarten – secondary
- Religious affiliation: Armenian Evangelical Church
- Website: Armenian Evangelical College

The Yeprem and Martha Philibosian Armenian Evangelical College (A.E.C.) (Armenian: Հայ Աւետարանական Գոլէճ, Arabic: المدرسة الأرمنية الانجيلية العالية) was founded in 1923 in Beirut, Lebanon. There are three sections to the school: a kindergarten for children aged 4–6 years, a primary section for children 6–12 years and a secondary level for those aged 12–18 years.
