= Falaq =

Falaq may refer to:

- Al-Falaq, the 113th chapter of the Quran
- Falaq-1, Iranian made missile system
- Falaq-2, Second-generation of Falaq missile system
- Falaq (radar), Iranian air surveillance radar system
- Falaq Naaz (born 1991), Indian actress

== See also ==
- Falak (disambiguation)
- Falaque Rashid Roy, Indian actress
