= Killing of Pascal Suleiman =

Killing of a Lebanese Christian figure in Lebanon

- Date: 7 April 2024
- Location: Kharbeh, Lebanon (Abduction) Northern Syria (Body found)
- Type: Abduction and murder by shooting
- Cause: Car theft
- Perpetrators: Syrian gang members (per LAF and ISF)
- Deaths: Pascal Sleiman
- Arrests: 6
- Suspects: 11

On April 9, 2024, Pascal Suleiman, a senior figure in the Christian Lebanese Forces party, was abducted and killed in the area of Byblos, Lebanon. Approximately a day and a half later, his body was found in Syria, sparking outrage among the Christian population in Lebanon, venting their anger on Syrian refugees, that fled the Syrian civil war, for several days.

== Background ==
From the years of 2011–2016, there was an influx of over 1.5 million refugees from Syria to the neighboring country of Lebanon. As the numbers of Syrians in Lebanon have grown, so have tensions; the attitude towards reception of Syrians in Lebanon quickly became opposed to. The influx of Syrians into Lebanon has resulted in economic, political, social and religious tensions in Lebanon.

Pascal Sleiman (Arabic: باسكال سليمان) was a Lebanese IT expert from the village of Mayfouq that worked for Byblos Bank for 20 years. He was a member of the Lebanese Forces (LF) and was appointed the coordinator of the party in the Byblos District. He was married to Micheline Wehbe and had three children. Multiple Lebanese Forces members have been assassinated prior. In the same year, Elias Hasrouni, a Lebanese Forces veteran, was found murdered in his car in Ain Ebil which the LF and other parties accused Hezbollah of involvement. In 2002, LF student leader Ramzi Irani was abducted and later found dead in 2002, which occurred during the Syrian occupation of Lebanon as part of a string of political assassinations against Syria's critics.

== Abduction and killing ==
On the afternoon of April 7, 2024, Pascal Sleiman, the coordinator for the Christian Lebanese Forces party in the Byblos area, got into his car after returning home from a relative’s funeral. While driving in a black Audi at around 6:15 p.m. on Sunday in the area of Kharbeh, he was ambushed and kidnapped by unidentified assailants of Syrian nationality who blocked him while he was driving and forced his car off the road.

During his abduction he was calling a friend and he was heard through the phone saying "I have children, don't kill me" which were his last known words. News got out of his kidnapping and protestors blocked roads demanding a safe return and attempted to impose pressure on security forces to find Suleiman's whereabouts.

A day and a half later, his body was found by Syrian soldiers in the Hawit area of Syria and a video of his alleged corpse circulated online. Sleiman's body was delivered to the Basel al-Assad Hospital in Homs by the Lebanese Red Cross and then transported to Lebanon.

== Aftermath ==
Suleiman's funeral was held on 12 April at the Church of Saint George, Byblos. The ceremony was initiated by Maronite patriarch Bechara Boutros al-Rahi. The Lebanese-Christian community called the citizens of Lebanon to unite, and participate in the funeral ceremony in solidarity of his "martyrdom".

== Investigations and reactions ==
Initially, it was claimed that Hezbollah was behind the abduction, however, leaks from the Lebanese security forces showed that a gang of Syrian refugees was responsible. The Lebanese Army arrested three Syrians and a Lebanese mole for questioning and to find the victim's whereabouts. With the cooperation of a unit of the Syrian army, they were able to arrest the four kidnappers of Syrian nationalities including the alleged leader named Bilal Mohammad Dello. Eleven have been implicated in the case, however five are in the run and are believed to have fled to Syria. Three of which are considered to be the main leaders behind the operation.

Official judicial sources said that Suleiman was killed by a car theft gang, however the Lebanese Forces and allied parties claim it was a political assassination particularly orchestrated by Hezbollah and the Syrian regime, who have been known to have assassinated numerous critics and opposition politicians. Hezbollah secretary general, Hassan Nasrallah, denied these claims in a speech and added that the accusations were intended to cause sectarian strife.

The discovery of Suleiman's body in Syria and leaks that implicated Syrian nationals, angered the Christians in Lebanon, who attacked Syrian refugees in the streets between Jbeil and other places across the country. On April 10, local Christians in Bourj Hammoud, a suburb of Beirut, declared to the Syrian migrants in the area that they must vacate all businesses and apartments in Bourj Hammoud by April 12. The following day, Christians distributed leaflets in the Ashrafieh neighborhood of Beirut, issuing an ultimatum to the Syrian refugees to leave the area by April 12 (the next day). Leader of the Lebanese Forces, Samir Geagea, called for calm and personally visited Jbeil.

Following the killing, the Lebanese Interior Minister declared that the presence of Syrians in Lebanon must end, and security forces were instructed to enforce Lebanese law on the Syrian refugees within Lebanon's territory. The minister of the displaced, Issam Sharafeddine, even called for the execution of the murderers and the LF reportedly adopted an even firmer stance concerning the presence of Syrian refugees.

On 24 May 2025, the Lebanese Army announced that Syria handed over one of the main suspects in the killing. The statement read, "The detainee is the leader of a kidnapping, theft and forgery gang and has a large number of arrest warrants against him. An investigation has been initiated under the supervision of the competent judiciary".

On August 25, 2025 the Lebanese Army announced they arrested a man linked to the abduction and killing of Sleiman. According to sources the investigations revealed he was involvement in a wide criminal network engaged in car theft, smuggling into Syria, kidnappings, drug trafficking, and forgery. His arrest follows the earlier handover of another suspect by Syrian authorities in May 2025. The two of them are considered key figures in Sleiman’s murder case.

On August 2026, Mount Lebanon’s First Investigating Judge, Nada Asmar, officially issued her 17-page judicial indictment. The indictment officially ruled out an initial theory that Suleiman's killing was merely a botched carjacking. The judge declared the operation a planned, premeditated crime conducted by an organized criminal ring with forensic reports verified that Suleiman was severely beaten with weapons and tortured outside his car before being placed inside.

== See also ==
- List of extrajudicial killings and political violence in Lebanon
