= Talfazat-ART =

Talfazat is an Arabic IPTV network, streaming 19 live Arabic TV channels and On-Demand Arabic videos including news, entertainment, music and sports channels

Many of the on Demand shows are recorded series that are premiered during Arabic TV’s Prime season of Ramadan

Users who are registered with Talfazat can watch programs on the proprietary player on the website or on their Televisions. The same content can be accessed on a television through a top set box that is connected to the public internet. Both of these processes can be referred to as IPTV

Talfazat is powered by Neulion IPTV technology.

== Channels Offered ==
 (As of February 22, 2012)

- 2MTV
- Abu Dhabi Emirates
- Abu Dhabi Sports
- Addounia TV
- Al Alam
- Al Alan
- Al Baghdadia
- Al Diyar
- Al Rai TV
- Arab Woman Channel
- Future TV
- Hannibal
- Infinity
- Mehwar
- OTV
- Palestine TV
- Sama Dubai
- Sudan TV
- Tele Liban

== Availability ==
Currently Talfazat is available in the U.S. and Canada.

== Legality ==
Talfazat is a legitimately legal service which pays for the rights to broadcast its channels.

== Sources ==
Official Website IPTV technology
