= Habib Haddad =

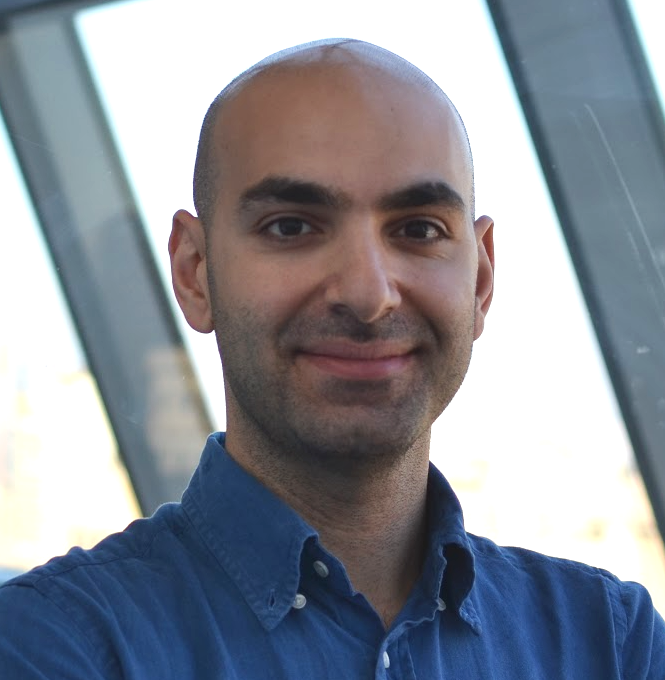
- Born: 1980 (age 45–46); Beirut, Lebanon
- Education: BS American University in Beirut, MS, University of Southern California,
- Occupation: E14 Fund
- Awards: 2009 Young Global Leader, 2011 Top Innovator under 35,

Habib Haddad (born 1980) is a serial entrepreneur and early stage investor. He is currently the president and managing director of the E14 Fund a venture fund in partnership with MIT. Haddad began his career as a founding engineer at a computer vision startup in 2004, and later worked on early GPU technologies at ATI Technologies prior to its acquisition by Advanced Micro Devices (AMD). He subsequently founded Yamli, which introduced one of the first probabilistic transliteration models and became an early example of an interactive natural-language-processing web product. The company was acquired by Yahoo in 2011.

He has been named by the World Economic Forum as a Young Global Leader in 2009 and as a top innovator under 35 (TR35) by the MIT Technology Review. Haddad's work in the MENA region is credited with playing a key role in strengthening its entrepreneurship ecosystem.

== Education ==
Haddad holds a Bachelor of Computer and Communication Engineering from the American University in Beirut and a master's degree in electrical engineering from the University of Southern California.

== Career ==
Haddad is currently the president and managing director of the E14 Fund that invests in spin-offs from MIT.

In 2004, he became a founding engineer at Mok3 (later Everyscape), an image-based modeling software company spun out of MIT's Computer Science and Artificial Intelligence Laboratory (CSAIL). He remained with the company until 2005, after which he joined ATI Technologies as a senior software engineer, working on its first GPU driver prior to ATI's acquisition by Advanced Micro Devices (AMD).

In 2007, Haddad founded Yamli, which introduced a probabilistic language model focused on transliteration and became one of the early interactive natural-language-processing web platforms. Yamli was acquired by Yahoo! in 2012.

From 2012 to 2016, he served as the founding chief executive officer of Wamda, a regional platform of programs and networks supporting entrepreneurship across the Middle East and North Africa with investments that include Careem and LittleBits.

== Social Impact ==
In 2006, he founded Relief Lebanon to support relief efforts during the 2006 war in Lebanon. The grass root effort was featured by the "101 Stories to Tell" initiative by the UNDP in February 2009.

In 2009, Haddad along with two other Middle East technology entrepreneurs, founded, YallaStartup, a non-governmental organization that aims to foster early stage entrepreneurship and startup creation. It was one of the first support organizations for MENA Entrepreneurs.

In 2011 he co-created Alive.in, a website that brought 1000 volunteers to transcribe and translate voicemails from the Egyptian protesters after the government shutdown of the internet. He started the company when Google and Twitter launched a project to allow people to leave a voice mail that will be then put on Twitter, Haddad came up with an idea to crowd source translation of those voices in real time from Arabic to other languages.

In 2020, Haddad co-launched Beirut Box with his wife, Hala Hanna and friends Diala Ezzelidn, Hashim Sarkis (Dean of MIT's School of Architecture and Planning), a fundraising initiative engaging restaurants in Boston and beyond to raise money for relief and recovery after the Beirut explosion.

Habib Haddad serves on the board of LebNet, a nonprofit organization for Lebanese professionals and entrepreneurs, and has been Chairman of its Board of Directors since at least 2023.

== Awards ==
- 2009: The World Economic Forum recognized Haddad as a Young Global Leader. 30 under 30 Most Powerful Arabs, Arabian Business.
- 2011: Named as a Top Innovator under 35 (TR35) by the MIT Technology Review.
- 2009, 2015: Distinguished Alumni Award, American University of Beirut.
- 2013: The Arab Thought Foundation awarded him the "Arab Creativity Award". The same year the American University Beirut honoured the entrepreneur as a distinguished alum.
- 2012: Young Entrepreneur Award, Takreem
- 2015: Most powerful 100 Arabs under 40, Arabian Business.
- 2016: American University of Beirut counts him among 150 AUB History Makers for the university's 150-year anniversary.
- 2024: 10 Very Important Humans beyond Boston's AI revolution

== Leadership ==
- Member of the Technology Pioneers selection committee of the World Economic Forum (2013–present)
- Co-Chair World Economic Forum Summit on the Middle East & North Africa (2011)
- Vice Chair of the Global Agenda Council on Entrepreneurship (2013), Member of to the Global Agenda Council on Innovation (2014–2015) – World Economic Forum
- Member of the World Economic Forum Global Future Council on Systems and Platforms (2016–present)
- Academy Member, Global Teacher Prize
- Advisory Board Member, Faculty of Engineering and Architecture, American University of Beirut
