= Radwan Force =

Special operations unit of Hezbollah

Al-Hajj Radwan Force
- فوج الحاج رضوان
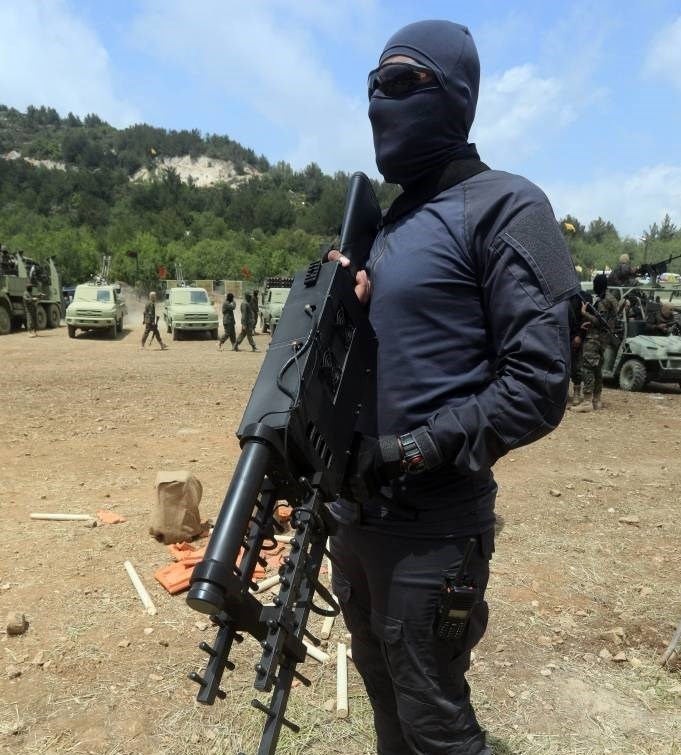
- A militant of the Radwan Force in May 2023
- Active: 2008–present
- Country: Lebanon
- Allegiance: Hezbollah
- Type: Special forces
- Role: Military-security unit, direct action, raiding, ambush, sniping, reconnaissance
- Size: c. 2,500 (est. 2022)
- Part of: Hezbollah's military wing
- Nickname: Unit 125
- Engagements: Syrian civil war; Al-Qusayr offensive; Qalamoun offensive (2017); Operation Spring Shield; 2024 Syrian opposition offensives; 2024 Homs offensive; Israel–Hezbollah conflict (2023–present); 2024 Lebanon War; 2026 Lebanon war; Battle of Bint Jbeil (2026); Battle of Khiam (2026)

Commanders
- Current commander: Vacant
- Notable commanders: Ibrahim Aqil X Ahmed Wehbe X Haytham Ali Tabatabai X Hamza Ibrahim Haidar †; Abu Ali Reda Abbas X (Note: Also known as Abu Hussein Barish)

The al-Hajj Radwan Force (Arabic: فوج الحاج رضوان, romanized: Fawj al-Ḥajj Raḍwān, lit. 'al-Hajj Radwan Regiment', also spelled Redwan or Ridwan) is a special forces unit of Hezbollah. According to Alma Center, its main mission is to infiltrate the territory of Israel, with specific attention to Galilee and northern Israel.

Hezbollah has trained special forces fighters since the 1990s, which are today part of the Radwan Force. Originally known as the "Rapid Intervention Force" or the "Intervention Unit", the unit was renamed in 2008 to honor Imad Fayez Mughniyeh, a senior Hezbollah leader also known as "Hajj Radwan." The Radwan Forces have particular experience in raids and small unit tactics.

The unit has been active in various conflicts, including the Syrian civil war and the ongoing skirmishes along the Lebanon–Israel border. The unit has been involved in the fighting since October 7, 2023, and is expected by Israeli officials to lead any future Hezbollah incursions into Israel.

== Mission ==
The Radwan Force is a special operations unit in Hezbollah’s armed forces. According to Tal Beeri, it is tasked with launching offensive attacks into Israeli territory and capturing civilian communities in the Galilee. Israeli officials expect the Radwan Force to lead any future Hezbollah infiltration into Israel, similar to the October 7 attacks by Hamas. In addition, the Radwan Force conducts reconnaissance and intelligence operations against Israeli targets using UAVs. The unit's sophistication and advanced weaponry explain how Hezbollah's has increasingly been viewed as a hybrid actor, especially sophisticated for a non-state actor, since the 2006 Lebanon War. and according to Hezbollah, perform "ambushes, assassinations, or operations that require deep infiltration."

== History ==
The Radwan Force was founded in 2006 as the Intervention Unit, a special offensive force to assist Hezbollah’s territorial units, and established with the assistance of the IRGC Quds Force. Under the command of senior Hezbollah militant leader Imad Mughniyeh, the unit was responsible for the 2006 Hezbollah cross-border raid that led to the outbreak of the 2006 Lebanon War. After Mughniyeh's killing, the unit was renamed for his operational alias Hajj Radwan (الحاج رضوان) in April 2008.

The existence of the Radwan Force was revealed during Ashura ceremonies in 2014 in the Dahiya neighborhood of Beirut, when militants of a distinct unit were photographed while providing security. At this time, the Radwan Force was allegedly commanded by a man named Muhammad Ali Hamadi.

As of 2023, the unit's commander was Haytham Ali Tabataba’i, who the United States added to its list of Specially Designated Global Terrorists (SDGT) in 2016. After the death of Ibrahim Aqil in September 2024, Abu Ali Reda Abbas was appointed head of the unit.

=== Involvement in the Syrian civil war ===
The Radwan Unit gained prominence as an elite reputation in its involvement in brutal fighting in Lebanon and Syria as part of Hezbollah's involvement in the Syrian civil war to support the government of Syrian President Bashar al-Assad. According to analysts, Hezbollah in general, and the Radwan Force in particular, gained significant battlefield experience and combat arms coordination. According to Israeli researcher Dima Adamsky, the cooperation with advanced regular armed forces in Syria enabled the Radwan Force to transition from advanced infantry to a commando force, capable to achieve significant operational and strategic effects in a war against Israel.

Early in the war, the unit was stationed in Aleppo area and contributed to battles of al-Qusayr and of al-Qalamoun, being decisive for the Syrian government's victories. Troops were later garrisoned in northern Syria and Saraqib in Idlib Governorate, operating with Harakat Hezbollah al-Nujaba and Liwa Fatemiyoun and suffering significant casualties against regular Turkish Armed Forces.

The Radwan Force area of operations also includes the Quneitra Governorate and Daraa, integrated with the Syrian Arab Army and Shiite militias. In the South, the Radwan Force cooperates with the 4th Armoured Division, and with the Russian Naval Infantry Unit 810.

In May 2017, Radwan Unit was allegedly withdrawn from Syria and redeployed on in southern Lebanon.

In February 2020, Radwan Unit was targeted by the Turkish Air Force as part of Operation Spring Shield, suffering over two dozen of casualties.

In the spring of 2023, the unit took part in rare public military exercises by Hezbollah, displaying its arsenal and simulating an infiltration into Israeli territory.

=== Gaza war ===
After the outbreak of the Gaza war, Hezbollah transferred medical teams and Radwan Force militants to the Israel–Syria border. The Radwan Force led Hezbollah's participation in the Israel–Hezbollah cross-border attacks during the war and took the lead for Hezbollah's operations in the broader, longstanding Hezbollah–Israel conflict. After the October 7 attacks, Israeli security officials cited the Radwan Unit as a force it could no longer accept on the Israel–Lebanon border. According to IDF Spokesman Daniel Hagari, the focus of Israel's actions in southern Lebanon was to force the Radwan Unit away from the border, either via a diplomatic solution that moved the force north of the Litani River or a major Israeli military offensive.

On 8 January 2024, in the village of Majdel Selm, an Israeli airstrike killed Wissam al-Tawil, a deputy head within the force with another Hezbollah fighter, the first death of a commander announced by Hezbollah since the October 7 attacks. As of February 2024, about 50 Radwan fighters had been killed in the previous 4 months, including Abbas Raad, the son of Lebanese Parliament member Mohammed Raad.

On 20 September 2024, an Israeli air strike in Dahieh in southern Beirut killed commander Ibrahim Aqil, head of the training unit Ahmed Wehbe, and 13 other Radwan Force commanders, who were at a meeting of Radwan Force leaders.

== Organisation ==
According to Tal Beeri, the Radwan Force consists of around 2,500 troops, with most of them having fought in Syria by 2024. The unit has an independent chain of command and order of battle. Under the Radwan Force command, several small, squad-level subunits (Arabic: شُعبة, romanized: Shu’aba, lit. 'Section') operate autonomously. Each sub-unit amounts to 7-10 militants based in Shiite villages in Lebanon. These villages function as logisitical reference points for squads. Squads are garrisoned in the vicinity of villages, with ammunition and self-sustainment supplies stored for emergencies. While being garrisoned near amicable villages, militants are kept separated from civilian population.

This organisation allows squad commanders to operate with significant tactical autonomy, without being dependent on external (and insecure) logistical assistance.

Additionally, the unit consists of combat engineers who, apart from military training, are also trained in cyber and information gathering fields.

According to Einav Halabi, three psychological care facilities operate in southern Lebanon in order to assist Radwan Force members.

According to American-Israeli news enterprise All Israel News, the commander up to 23 November 2023 was Khalil Shahimi.

== Selection and training ==
Militants are admitted into the Radwan Force after a careful vetting process. Training begins only after the screening procedure.

Training includes sniper training, anti-tank warfare, hand-to-hand combat, explosives training, tactical driving, as well as training for special forces. This latter variety of training includes a “captivity workshop”, in order to teach the trainee to behave in case of capture, and operation of intelligence-gathering UAVs.

The Radwan Force’s training also emphasizes physical fitness, long-distance running, mountain navigation, and tactical warfare. The unit’s operatives receive training directly from the IRGC-GF Saberin Unit, as well as specialised tactical and tunnel warfare training with North Korea.

== Insignia ==
The al-Hajj Radwan Force insignia consists of a roaring lion holding the Zulfiqar sword.

== Equipment ==
According to Tal Beeri, the Radwan Force has access to all weapons in Hezbollah's arsenal which may be relevant for its operations, including every weapon pertaining to infantry and commando warfare available on the arms market. Combat accessories, including of Western and Russian origin, are also used.

The Radwan Force employs small, highly mobile units on motorcycles, quad bikes, and light all-terrain vehicles equipped with Russian-made Kornet ATGMs.

=== Uniforms ===
On the occasion of their exposure in 2014, militants of the Radwan Force wore black uniforms, helmets, balaclavas, and dark goggles concealing their features and were armed with assault rifles typical of commando units.

According to the Israel Defense Forces-linked Meir Amit Intelligence and Terrorism Information Center, a 2023 video shows a Radwan Force member in a red beret and with an al-Radwan badge on his sleeve.

== See also ==
- Hezbollah armed strength
- 2006 Lebanon War
