= Wissam al-Tawil =

Lebanese militant (1970–2024)

- وسام الطويل
- Born: 1970; Tyre, Lebanon
- Died: 8 January 2024 (aged 53–54); Majdel Selm, Lebanon
- Cause of death: Airstrike by Israel
- Relatives: 2 Unknown Brothers
- Military career
- Allegiance: Hezbollah
- Branch: Redwan Force
- Service years: 1989–2024
- Nickname: Jawad
- Conflicts: South Lebanon conflict; 2006 Lebanon War; Syrian Civil War; Israel–Hezbollah conflict (2023–present) †

Wissam al-Tawil (Arabic: وسام الطويل; 1970 – 8 January 2024), also known as Jawad al-Tawil (Arabic: جواد الطويل), was a Lebanese militant and senior commander of Hezbollah's Radwan Force.

After joining Hezbollah in 1989, he participated in some of the group's biggest military engagements, including the 2006 Hezbollah cross-border raid that sparked the 2006 Lebanon War. During the Syrian Civil War, Tawil led the group's coordination with the Syrian Army and was a close aide of Mustafa Badreddine, Hezbollah's chief commander in Syria. Tawil also maintained close ties with Imad Mughniyeh and Qasem Soleimani, the former head of Iran's IRGC Quds Force.

== Early life and military career ==
Born in Tyre, Lebanon in 1970, al-Tawil joined Hezbollah in 1989 and actively engaged in numerous guerrilla attacks against Israeli forces and their Lebanese allies during the South Lebanon conflict. He was a member of a Hezbollah special unit that crossed into Israel during the 2006 Hezbollah cross-border raid that led to the capture of two Israeli soldiers Eldad Regev and Ehud Goldwasser and sparked the monthslong 2006 Lebanon War. During his years with Hezbollah, Tawil was close with the group's founding military chief Imad Mughniyeh, until the latter's assassination in 2008. He also had close links with Qasem Soleimani, head of Iran's Quds Force.

When Hezbollah intervened in the Syrian Civil War in 2011, al-Tawil was in charge of coordinating between Hezbollah and the Syrian Army in fighting against the Syrian rebels and in supporting the Syrian government led by Bashar al-Assad as a close aide to Mustafa Badreddine, Hezbollah's chief commander in Syria. He also participated in the Houthi takeover in Yemen, facilitating the transfer of long-range missiles to Yemen's Houthi movement.

At the time of his death, he held the position of deputy commander within Hezbollah's elite Radwan Unit. According to Israel, he was responsible for the strike on Israel's air force base in Mount Meron, which occurred two days before his assassination.

== Death ==
On 8 January 2024, al-Tawil was killed by an Israeli airstrike against a vehicle in the village of Majdel Selm in Lebanon. Another person was also killed in the airstrike. According to a security official, his killing was a "painful blow" to Hezbollah. At the time of his death, he was the highest ranking Hezbollah official killed during the Israel–Hezbollah conflict (2023–present). According to some Arab media outlets, he was reportedly the brother-in-law of Hassan Nasrallah, the secretary-general of Hezbollah.

In response to al-Tawil's killing, Hezbollah launched a drone attack on Israel's Northern Command headquarters in Safed on the following day, situated approximately 20 kilometres (12 mi) from the border.
