= Kherbet Selem =

Kherbet Selem خربة سلم
- Municipality
- Location within Lebanon
- Coordinates: 33°13′45″N 35°25′00″E
- Grid position: 190/292 PAL
- Country: Lebanon
- Governorate: Nabatieh Governorate
- District: Bint Jbeil District
- Established: 2001
- Elevation: 630 m (2,070 ft)
- Time zone: UTC+2 (EET)
  - Summer (DST): UTC+3 (EEST)
- Dialing code: +961

Kherbet Selem (Arabic: خربة سلم) is a municipality in southern Lebanon.

The municipality of Kherbet Selem is located in the Kaza of Bint Jbeil, one of the eight mohafazats (governorates) of Lebanon. Khirbet Selm is 104 kilometers (64.6256 mi) away from Beirut the capital of Lebanon. The village's elevation is 630 meters (2067.03 ft – 688.968 yd) above sea level. Kherbet Selem surface stretches for 379 hectares (12.60 km^{2} – 9.46294 mi^{2}).

== Etymology ==
The name of the town means "the ruins of Selem". Kherbeh means ruins, and Selem is likely Salem, a Canaanite deity.

== History ==
In 1875 Victor Guérin described it: "In the middle of a deep and broad ravine the Wady el-Hadjr, a sort of rocky islet lying north and south. Oblong and narrow, it serves as the site of a village called Kh. Selem, which contains a population of 130 Metawileh."

He further noted: "Here are found the remains of an ancient church, such as cut stones, shafts more or less broken, and a circular baptismal font. Here I also saw several Greek crosses engraved on lintels of doors, cisterns, presses cut in the rock, and even some houses still standing which may be older than the Mussulman invasion."

In 1881, the PEF's Survey of Western Palestine (SWP) described it: "A village, built of stone, containing 200 Metawileh, on ridge, with spring and cisterns; arable cultivation around."

They further noted: "South of the village there is a level area of rock, in the middle of which one column is standing. Another column and two or three pedestals form part of a wall on the west. There are no capitals. This was probably a Christian church. The columns are not well dressed."

On july, 12 2026, the Hezbollah militia buried in a mass funeral ceremony 30 of its fighters originary from the village and killed during the 2026 conflict with Israel .

== Demographics ==
In 2014 Muslims made up 99.24% of registered voters in Kherbet Selem. 97.60% of the voters were Shiite Muslims.

== Bibliography ==
- Conder, C.R.; Kitchener, H.H. (1881). The Survey of Western Palestine: Memoirs of the Topography, Orography, Hydrography, and Archaeology. Vol. 1. London: Committee of the Palestine Exploration Fund.
- Guérin, V. (1880). Description Géographique Historique et Archéologique de la Palestine (in French). Vol. 3: Galilee, pt. 2. Paris: L'Imprimerie Nationale.
- Palmer, E.H. (1881). The Survey of Western Palestine: Arabic and English Name Lists Collected During the Survey by Lieutenants Conder and Kitchener, R. E. Transliterated and Explained by E.H. Palmer. Committee of the Palestine Exploration Fund.
