= MV Karadeniz Powership Orhan Bey =

Floating power plant

Karadeniz Powership Orhan Bey
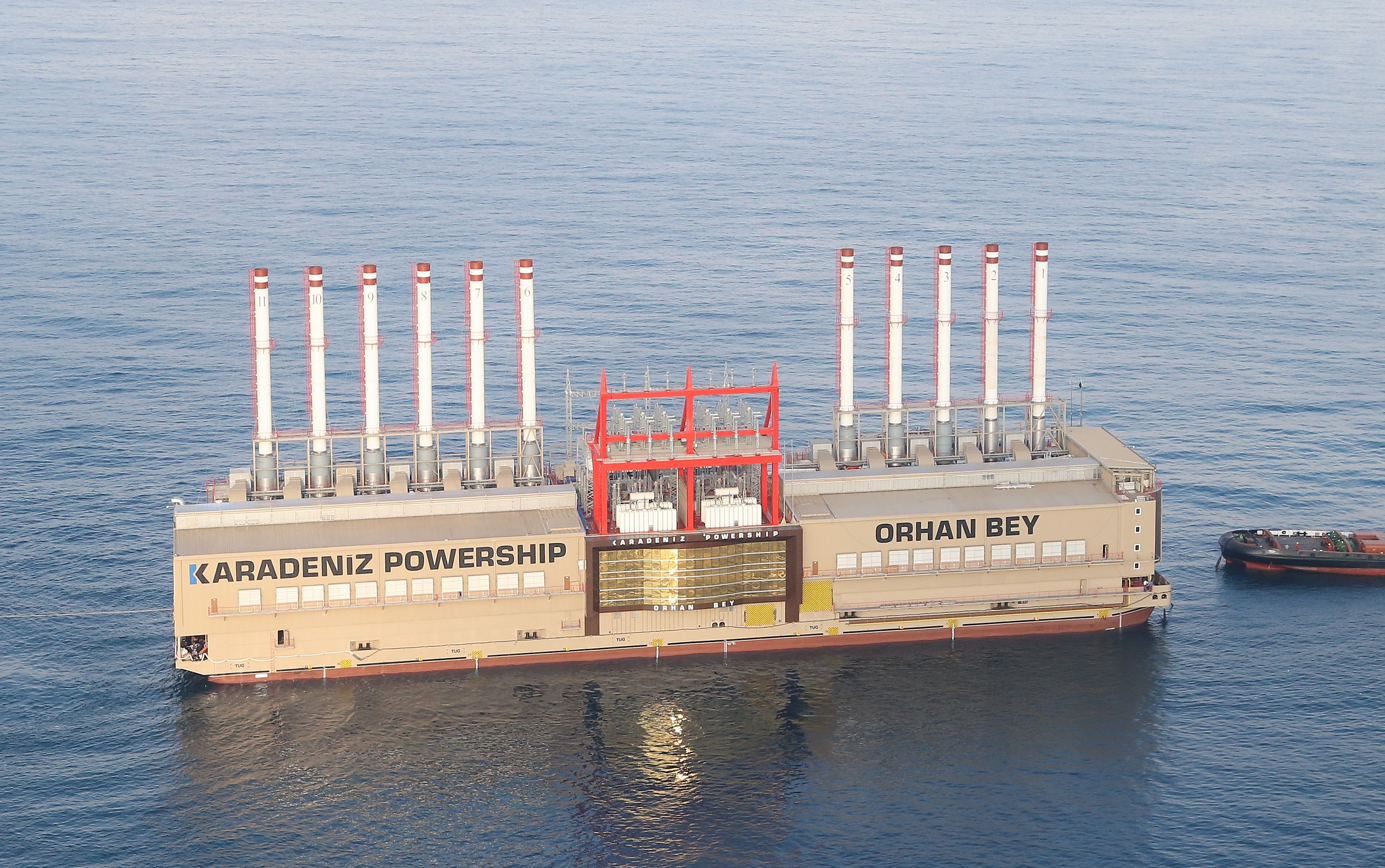
- Karadeniz Powership Orhan Bey

History
- Owner: Karpowership (2009– )
- Operator: Karpowership
- Builder: Sedef Shipyard, Tuzla, Istanbul, Turkey
- Completed: July 2013

General characteristics
- Class & type: Special Service-Floating Power Plant
- Capacity: 202 MW generation (as Powership)

MV Karadeniz Powership Orhan Bey is a power barge, a floating power plant, owned and operated by Karpowership. She was commissioned in 2013, and initially contracted to supply electricity to the power grid in Lebanon.

== Powership ==
Built in August 2013 by Sedef Shipyard in Tuzla, Istanbul, she was renamed Karadeniz Powership Orhan Bey after the Karadeniz Holding's vice chairperson. Equipped with eleven electric generators and four high-voltage transformers, the Powership has an installed generation capacity of 202 MW on dual-fuel (HFO- and gas-fired). The Powership's fuel tanks capacity allows her to generate ten days long uninterrupted power.

Arrived in Beirut, Lebanon on August 12, 2013, she joined the other fleet member MV Karadeniz Powership Fatmagül Sultan, which was already generating electricity. Moored facing Jieh Power Plant, Orhan Bey was connected to the grid on September 3, 2013. According to a power purchase agreement, worth US$370 million, signed on July 13, 2012 in Beirut with the Lebanese Government, the two powerships supply a total of 270 MW electricity in Lebanon, covering 27% of the power needs of the country.

At the end of 2016, the contract capacity was increased to 370 MW of reliable power from the Powerships for another 2 years. 370 MW contract is being served by 406 MW installed capacity, dual-fuel, and combined-cycle Powerships located in Zouk and Jieh municipalities.

The contract expired in September 2021, while Électricité du Liban owed Karpowership overdue payments in excess of $100 million. Powership has stopped its supplies on 1 October 2021.

As of 6 January 2023 Karadeniz Powership Orhan Bey is supplying SLN-Eramet Doniambo ferronickel production unit near Nouméa, New Caledonia.
