= MV Karadeniz Powership Fatmagül Sultan =

Karadeniz Powership Fatmagül Sultan
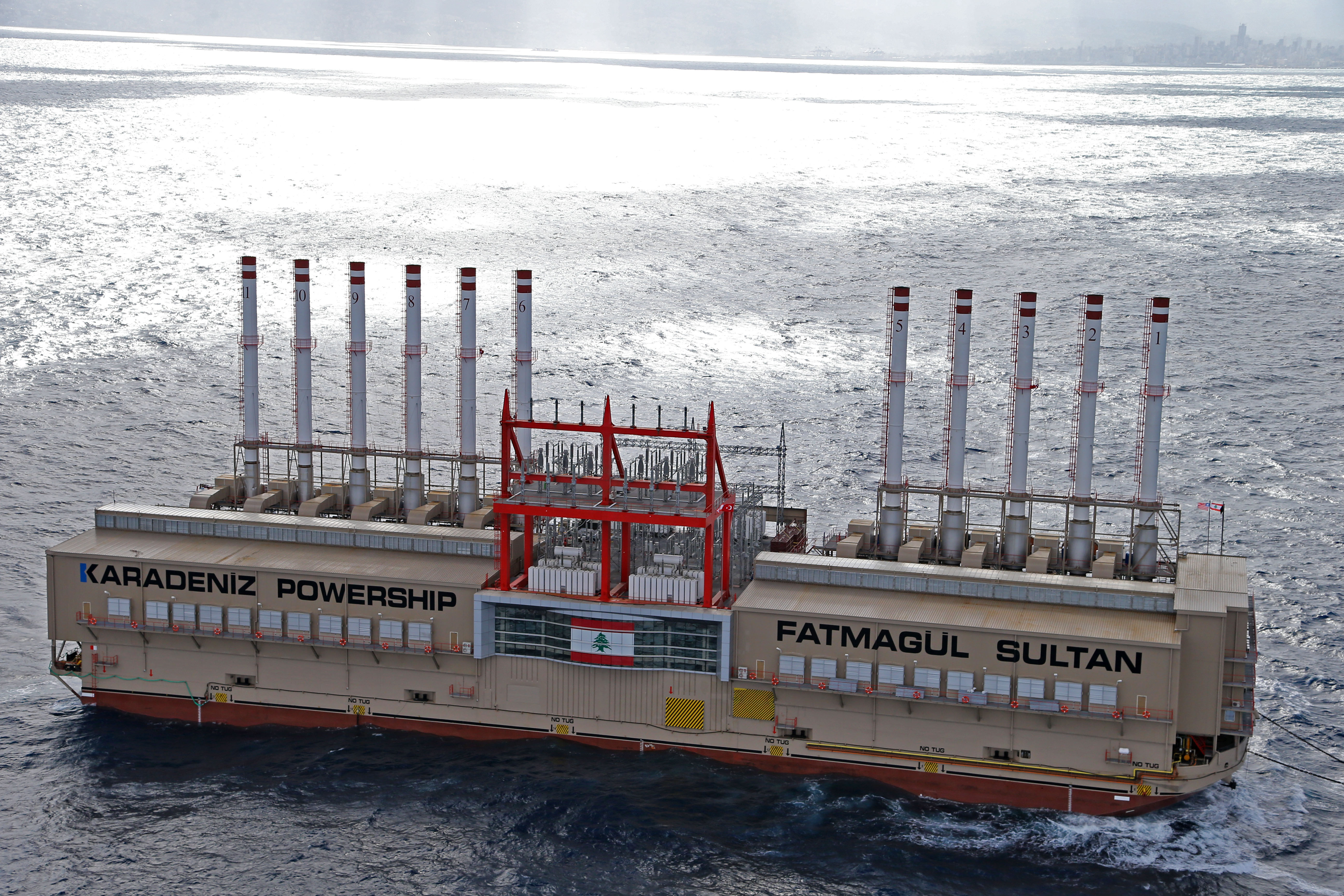
- Karadeniz Powership Fatmagül Sultan

History

Liberia
- Name: Karadeniz Powership Fatmagül Sultan
- Owner: Karpowership

General characteristics
- Class & type: Special Service-Floating Power Plant
- Length: 142.0 m (465 ft 11 in) (LOA)
- Beam: 42.0 m (137 ft 10 in)
- Capacity: 202 MW generation (as Powership)

The MV Karadeniz Powership Fatmagül Sultan is a Liberia-flagged Powership, a floating power plant, owned and operated by Karpowership. Built as a barge, she was converted into a Powership in 2013 at Sedef Shipyard in Tuzla, Istanbul, Turkey. She was commissioned to supply electricity to the power grid in Lebanon.

== Ship ==
The 142.0 m (465 ft 11 in) long vessel has a beam of 42.0 m (137 ft 10 in).

== Powership ==
Converted into a power barge by Sedef Shipyard in Tuzla, Istanbul in 2013, she was renamed Fatmagül Sultan after the sister of Karadeniz Holding's chairperson. Equipped with eleven electric generators, four high-voltage transformers and operated by a crew of sixty technicians and engineers, the Powership has an installed generation capacity of 202 MW on dual-fuel (HFO- and gas-fired). The Powership's fuel tanks capacity allows her to generate ten days long uninterrupted power.

According to a power purchase agreement, worth US$370 million, signed on July 13, 2012, in Beirut with the Lebanese Government, the Powership is the first of two to supply a total of 406.2 MW electricity in Lebanon. The Powership left Turkey on February 8, 2013, heading for Lebanon. She arrived at her destination after one week voyage. Following a ceremony held in Beirut in early April 2013 in presence of Gebran Bassil, Lebanese Minister of Energy and Water, the Powership began to supply 188 MW electricity to the grid in Lebanon, where the demand on electric power grew up more than expected from 2011 on through increased consumption and the influx of refugees of the Syrian Civil War. For a period of three years, at least 15% of the country's electric power needs is generated by the Powership. "This makes out additional two hours' electricity a day for the power-shortages beset country" as stated by the general manager of Électricité du Liban, main Power Utility of Lebanon.

The contract expired in September 2021, while Électricité du Liban owed Karpowership overdue payments in excess of $100 million. Powership has stopped its supplies on 1 October 2021.
