= 2026 in Lebanon =

- Decades: 2000s; 2010s; 2020s
- See also: History of Lebanon; Timeline of Lebanese history; List of years in Lebanon

Events in the year 2026 in Lebanon.

== Incumbents ==
Photo	Post	Name
	President of Lebanon	Joseph Aoun
	Prime Minister of Lebanon	Nawaf Salam

== Events ==
=== January ===
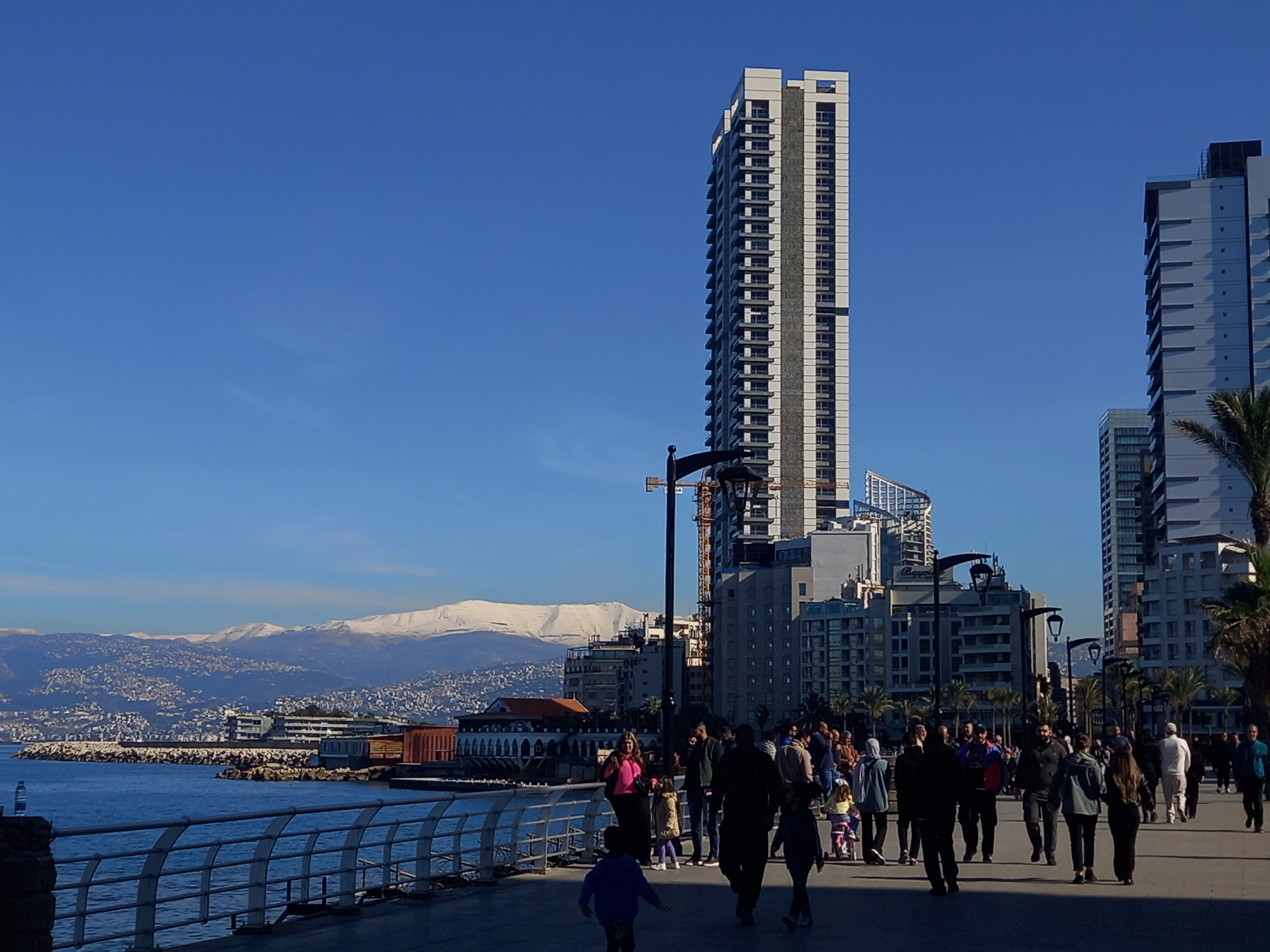
The seafront promenade (Corniche) in Beirut on 4 January 2026.

- 9 January – The government signs an agreement with an international consortium consisting of TotalEnergies, Eni, and QatarEnergy to develop the Block 8 gas field off the coast of southern Lebanon.
- 12 January – The Le Commodore Hotel Beirut ceases operations after having been in existence since 1943.
- 13 January – The United States designates the Lebanese chapter of the Muslim Brotherhood as a foreign terrorist organization, citing its support for Hamas.
- 15 January – Authorities announce the arrest of a Syrian national in Byblos on suspicion of providing financial support for Assad loyalist fighters in Syria on behalf of exiled senior officials of the Assad regime.
- 26 January – The Qatar Fund for Development announces a $430 million aid package to Lebanon, primarily to support its energy sector.
- 30 January – The government approves an agreement allowing for the repatriation of Syrian nationals serving prison sentences in Lebanon.

=== February ===
- 8 February – Fifteen people are killed in the collapse of two adjoining residential buildings in Tripoli.
- 9 February – Atwi Atwi, an official of the Islamic Group and former mayor of Al-Hebbariyah, is abducted in a cross-border raid by Israeli forces.
- 10 February – The United States imposes sanctions on the gold trading firm Jood SARL, citing its role in raising funds for Hezbollah.
- 16 February – FIFA president Gianni Infantino is granted a Lebanese passport on account of his marriage to a Lebanese national.

=== March ===
- 2 March –
  - 2026 Israeli–United States strikes on Iran: Hezbollah carries out an aerial attack on Israel in retaliation for the assassination of Iran's supreme leader, Ali Khamenei. In response, Israel launches a military operation in Lebanon.
  - The government bans military activities by Hezbollah.
- 4 March – Israeli strikes on a hotel and residential areas in the towns of Aramoun and Saadiyat, in the south of Beirut, kill 11 people and injure four others.
- 5 March – The government prohibits activities by members of Iran's Islamic Revolutionary Guard Corps within Lebanon and instructs authorities to detain and deport individuals linked to the group. The cabinet also introduces a visa requirement for Iranian nationals entering the country.
- 6 March –
  - At least 41 people are killed, including three soldiers, and 40 more injured in a series of Israeli airstrikes in and around Al-Nabi Shayth, Beqaa Valley.
  - Three Ghanaian UN peacekeepers are injured in an Israeli missile strike in southern Lebanon.
- 8 March –
  - An Israeli airstrike on a hotel in central Beirut kills at least four people and injures 10 others.
  - Two Israeli soldiers are killed in overnight clashes with Hezbollah in southern Lebanon.
- 9 March – Killing of Pierre al-Rahi: Maronite Catholic priest Father Pierre al-Rahi is killed by an Israeli double strike on a house in the Christian-majority town of Al-Qlayaa.
- 11 March –
  - Seven people are killed and 18 are injured after an Israeli strike on Temnine Et Tahta, Baalbek-Hermel Governorate. Five people are also injured after a strike on the nearby village of Aali en Nahri.
  - Hezbollah launches over 100 rockets at Israel, injuring five civilians in Upper Galilee.
- 12 March –
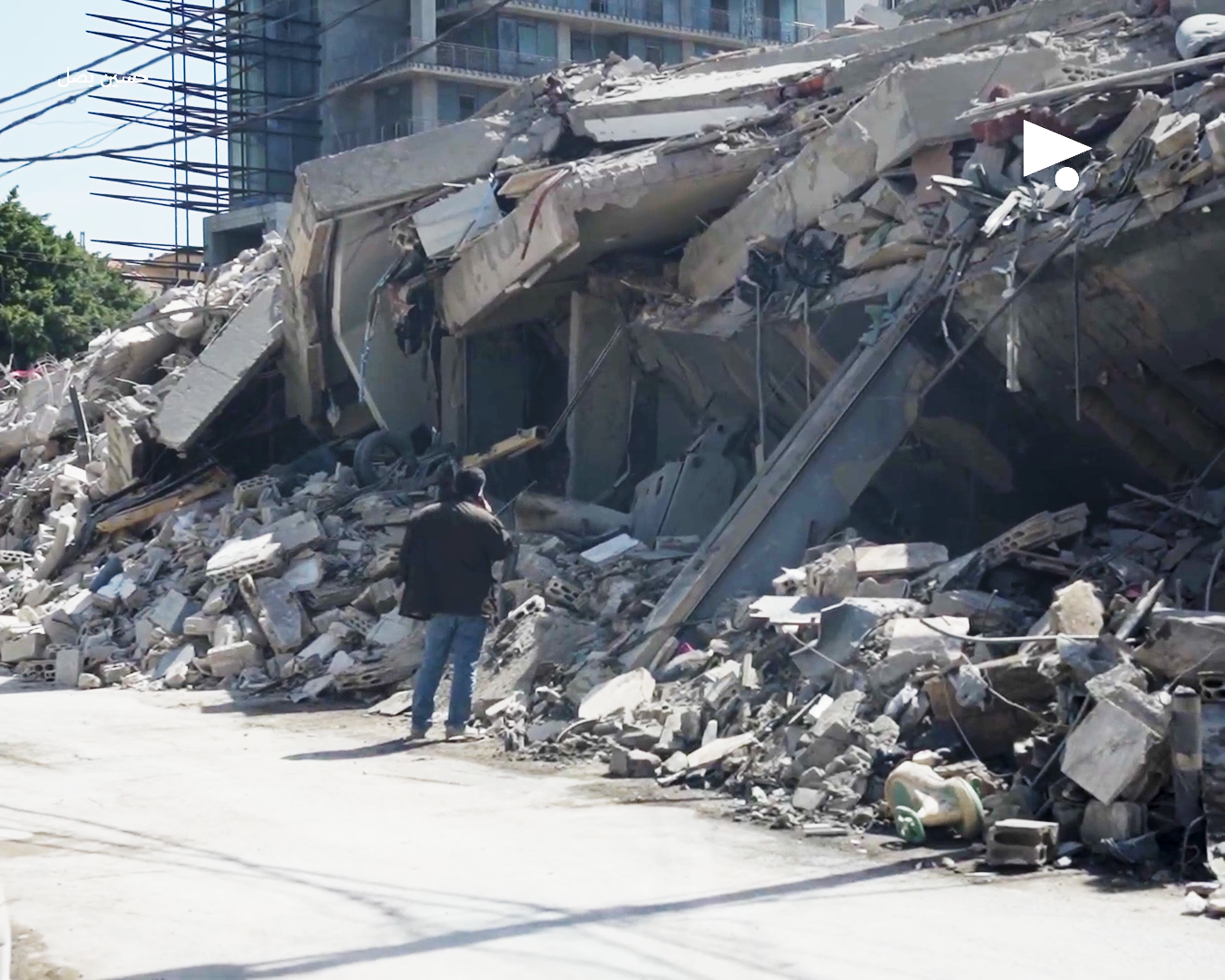
  Aftermath of an Israeli airstrike in the Bachoura neighborhood of Beirut, 18 March 2026.
  - Eight people are killed and 31 more injured on the Israeli airstrike on the Ramlet al-Baida beach in central Beirut. Seven more people are also killed in other attacks in the country.
  - Hezbollah launches over 200 rockets and 20 drones at northern Israel, injuring two.
- 16 March – The IDF's 91st Division launches a ground operation against Hezbollah in southern Lebanon, expanding a buffer zone along the border.
- 17 March – A Lebanese soldier is killed and four more are injured in an Israeli airstrike in Qaaqaait al-Jisr, Nabatieh Governorate.
- 18 March – Six people are killed and dozens injured in an Israeli airstrike on a building in Beirut.
- 24 March –
  - Lebanon expels the Iranian ambassador, Mohammad Reza Sheibani, citing Iran’s financial and military support for Hezbollah.
  - Israeli defense minister Israel Katz states that the IDF will control a "security zone" up to the Litani River in southern Lebanon until the threat of Hezbollah is removed.
- 26 March – Two Israeli soldiers are killed in action in southern Lebanon.
- 28 March – Five paramedics are killed in an Israeli airstrike in Zawtar al-Gharbiyah.

=== April ===
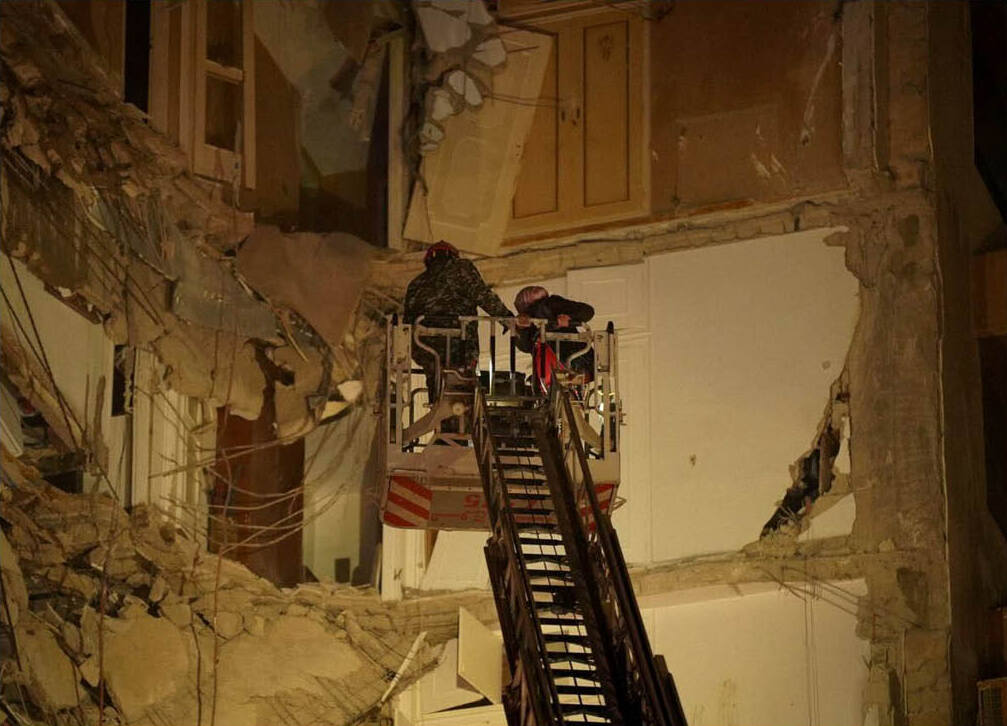
Aftermath of the 8 April 2026 Israeli airstrikes on Beirut, Lebanon, which killed 357 people.

- 1 April – Israeli airstrikes kill seven people, including the Hezbollah commander for Iraq, and injure dozens in Beirut and nearby Khalde.
- 6 April – Christian anti-Hezbollah Lebanese Forces official Pierre Mouawad, his wife Flavia, and another woman are killed in an Israeli airstrike.
- 7 April –
  - Three people are killed and several are injured by an Israeli airstrike in Maarakah, Tyre District.
  - One person is killed by an Israeli drone strike in Deir ez-Zahrani, Nabatieh District.
  - Israel deploys the 98th Division to southern Lebanon, raising the force there to five divisions.
- Israeli Prime Minister Benjamin Netanyahu asserts that the US-Israel-Iran ceasefire does not apply to Lebanon, contradicting mediator Pakistani Prime Minister Shehbaz Sharif's announcement.
- 8 April – Hezbollah says that it halted attacks on Israel and on Israeli soldiers in Lebanon, but later claims responsibility for launching rockets towards northern Israel in response to massive Israeli attacks on that day.
- 14 April – The first direct diplomatic negotiations between Lebanon and Israel since 1993 are held in Washington, DC.
- 15 April – Two Filipino migrant workers are killed in a hostage-taking incident by their employer in Beirut.
- 17 April – A 10-day truce between Lebanon and Israel comes into effect.
- 18 April – Two French soldiers are killed and two others are injured in an attack on UNIFIL peacekeepers blamed on Hezbollah.
- 23 April –
  - President Trump says that Israel and Lebanon agree to a three-week extension of the ceasefire.
  - Italian soldiers install a new statue of Jesus Christ in the Christian village of Debel in place of a previous statue given by the IDF, who destroyed the previous statue with a sledgehammer, drawing widespread outrage.
- 27 April – Hezbollah leader Naim Qassem said that the group will not revert to the pre-March status and will respond to Israeli attacks.

=== May ===
- 6 May –
  - Sixteen people are killed and 21 injured with three paramedics by Israeli drone strikes and airstrikes across southern Lebanon despite the ceasefire.
  - An Israeli airstrike on a building in Beirut kills a top commander of Hezbollah's Radwan Force.
- 8 May – Israeli attacks kill eight people and injured 15 including three children in Southern Lebanon and As-Saksakiyah.
- 10 May – Israeli attacks kill at least 39 people in Lebanon with the IDF stating that it attacked Hezbollah targets.
- 13 May – Israeli drone strikes kill at least 22 people, including eight children in the towns of Arab Salim, Harouf, Roumin and Jieh south of Beirut.
- 15 May –
  - The U.S. State Department announces that Israel and Lebanon agreed to extend their ceasefire for 45 days, and that more specific political and security negotiations will begin on May 29 and June 2, respectively.
  - Israeli airstrikes kill at least seven people across Nabatieh, Tibnin, and Harouf, and injure 37 people in Tyre.
- 17 May –
  - Israeli airstrikes kill at least eight people across Jwaya, Tayr Debba, and Tayr Felsay.
  - An Israeli missile strike on an apartment near Baalbek kills a commander of Palestinian Islamic Jihad and his daughter.
- 18 May –
  - Hezbollah claims that it shot down an Israeli aircraft over Ayta al-Jabal, hit the vehicle of the commander of the IDF 300th Brigade in Shomera in northern Israel, and targeted an IDF position in Maroun al-Ras with drones.
  - The Lebanese health ministry announces that the death toll has surpassed 3,000 people, with at least 3,020 people killed and 9,273 wounded since the war with Israel began on March 2.
- 19 May – Israeli airstrikes kill 19 people and injure 34 in Nabatieh District and Tyre District.
- 20 May – Israeli airstrikes kill at least eight people in Ad-Doueir, Tibnin, Burj el-Shamali, and Shebaa.
- 22 May –
  - Six people are killed and six more injured in an Israeli airstrike in Deir Qanoun an-Naher. Two paramedics are among the fatalities, while three more are injured.
  - A paramedic is killed and four more are injured in two separate Israeli airstrikes in Tyre District.
- 23 May — An Israeli airstrike on a residential building in Sir el Gharbiyeh kills at least 11 people and injures six.
- 31 May — The IDF seizes Beaufort Castle.

=== June ===
- 1 June — Israel agrees not to hit Beirut's southern suburbs, and Hezbollah agrees not to attack Israel as part of a US proposal, with the cease-fire framework to be expanded to include entire Lebanon.
- 3 June — Israel and Lebanon agree to renew the ceasefire mediated by the US, and to establish "pilot zones".
- 4 June –
  - A Serbian peacekeeper is killed while two others are injured in a strike on a UNIFIL base in southern Lebanon.
  - Hezbollah rejects the truce deal announced the previous day and demands a comprehensive truce and full withdrawal of Israel from Lebanon.
- 6 June – Rene Mouawad Airport in Qleiat is inaugurated in a ceremony led by prime minister Nawaf Salam.
- 7 June – Lebanese state media says that an Israeli strike in the southern suburbs of Beirut kills two people and injures 11 others. The IDF says that it targeted Hezbollah infrastructure after the group fired towards northern Israel.
- 10 June – Saudi Arabia lifts a ban on imports from Lebanon that had been in place since 2021.
- 14 June — Israel announces that it killed Ali Musa Daqduq, a senior Hezbollah commander responsible for the Karbala provincial headquarters raid that killed five American soldiers during the Iraq War in a strike in southern Lebanon over the weekend.
- 15 June — Pakistan, the primary mediator, states that both the United States and Iran declared the "immediate and permanent termination of military operations on all fronts, including in Lebanon" as part of the agreement to end the 2026 Iran war. Israel states that its forces will remain in Lebanon.
- 19 June — President Trump announces a renewed ceasefire between Israel and Hezbollah.
- 26 June — US Secretary of State Marco Rubio announces a framework deal between Israel and Lebanon that aims to achieve "lasting peace and security" through US mediation. The agreement asks for a cease-fire, with Hezbollah agreeing to terminate all hostilities and withdraw from southern Lebanon. Hezbollah later rejects it.

=== July ===
- 14 July — Lebanon detains a person close to Hezbollah on suspicion of spying for Israel.
- 15 July — The US State Department states that Israel agreed to withdraw from pilot zones in southern Lebanon.
- 20 July — The US announces that Israel handed over sections of its buffer zone in southern Lebanon to Lebanese control as part of the 2026 Israel–Lebanon ceasefire.
- 21 July —
  - Lebanon announces that the Lebanese army started deploying in Zawtar al-Gharbiyah following Israeli withdrawal from the town in accordance with the 2026 Israel–Lebanon ceasefire.
  - US President Donald Trump orders to allow direct US–Lebanon flights.
- 22 July – The ancient city of Tyre is included in the list of World Heritage in Danger.
- 24 July – The castles of Mount Amel are designated as UNESCO World Heritage Sites.
- 28 July —
  - Lebanon detains a person suspected of transferring fund to Islamic State in Syria.
  - UNIFIL soldiers neutralize four tons of explosives apparently left by Israel in Houla.
- 29 July — Over a dozen Lebanese lawyers file a complaint against a banker who met with Israeli Prime Minister Benjamin Netanyahu, stating that Lebanon's laws prohibit its citizens from contacting Israelis as the two nations have in a state of war since Israel's establishment in 1948.

=== August ===
- 3 August — Lebanon arrests an ex-Palestinian envoy on PA corruption charges.
- 6 August — The IDF stated that roughly 15 Israelis, mostly girls, infiltrated the Lebanese border before returning to Israel.
- 7 August — Lebanon and Israel agree on a shortlist of states that could send forces to verify Hezbollah disarmament.
- 8 August — Lebanon arrests a Syrian soldier who commanded the 17th Division under former President Bashar al-Assad for alleged crimes during the Syrian civil war. Lebanon later decides to hand over him to Syria after questioning.
- 11 August — Parliament abolishes the death penalty, a first for the Arab world, over opposition from Hezbollah's parliamentary caucus.
- 12 August — A contentious sweeping amnesty law for prisoners and fugitives is passed by Parliament.
- 13 August — Prime Minister Nawaf Salam states that hackers deleted posts condemning Israeli attacks and occupation.
- 20 August — The US imposes sanctions against Hezbollah, citing its actions on behalf of the Government of Iran.

=== September ===
- 3 September — Israeli Prime Minister Benjamin Netanyahu announces that five Lebanese civilians were released by Israel in exchange for information on Jewish remains in Lebanon.
- 8 September — UK Foreign Secretary Ed Miliband announces sanctions on the Hezbollah-affiliated Al-Qard Al-Hasan Association.
- 10 September — A relative of former Syrian president Bashar al-Assad is arrested in Lebanon.
- 12 September — A hunger strike is initiated by hundreds of prisoners at Roumieh Prison due to the stalled implementation of a sweeping amnesty law.
- 27 September — President Aoun orders security chiefs to stay away from the memorial ceremony for Hezbollah leader Hassan Nasrallah.

=== October ===
- 12 October – The European Union forms a new support mission for Lebanon.
- 15 October – Lebanese media reports that Mihrac Ural was arrested from Mansourieh without contact with Lebanese authorities by the Syrian General Intelligence Service and the Turkish National Intelligence Organization, while his wife and son were tied up.
- 16 October – Qatar pledges to help fund the rehabilitation of the electrical sector and future reconstruction of Lebanon's south following the 2026 Lebanon war at no cost to the Lebanese state due to the Lebanese liquidity crisis.

=== November ===
- 10 November – The IDF announces that an Israeli civilian entered Lebanon illegally near the Rosh HaNikra Crossing, adding that UN peacekeepers discovered him close to the border and handed him over to its soldiers for return to Israel.
- 13 November – The Lebanese army announces that it raided an arms depot in Beirut's southern suburbs, seizing "a considerable quantity of weapons and military ammunition."

== Holidays ==
- 1 January – New Year's Day
- 6 January – Epiphany and Armenian Christmas
- 9 February – St. Maroun Day
- 20 March – Eid al-Fitr
- 25 March – Annunciation Day
- 3 April – Good Friday
- 5 April – Easter Sunday
- 1 May – Labour Day
- 25 May – Liberation and Resistance Day
- 27 May – Eid al-Adha
- 16 June – Islamic New Year
- 15 August – Assumption Day
- 4 September – The Prophet's Birthday
- 22 November – Lebanese Independence Day
- 25 December – Christmas Day

== Deaths ==
- 17 February – Mohsen Dalloul, 93, journalist and politician, minister of agriculture (1989–1992) and defense (1992–1995)
- 5 March – Antoine Ghandour, 83, writer.
- 9 March – Pierre el-Raï, 50, priest.
- 26 March – Ahmad Kaabour, 70, singer.
- 22 April – Amal Khalil, journalist.
- 30 April – Milia Maroun, fashion designer.
- 12 June – Ali Musa Daqduq, 56-57, Hezbollah commander.
- 19 June – Mona Khalil, 76, conservationist and environmentalist.
- 23 July – Kōzō Okamoto, 78, Japanese-born communist militant and mass murderer (Lod Airport massacre).
- 14 September – Dory Chamoun, 94, MP (2009–2018).
