= List of cities and towns in Lebanon =

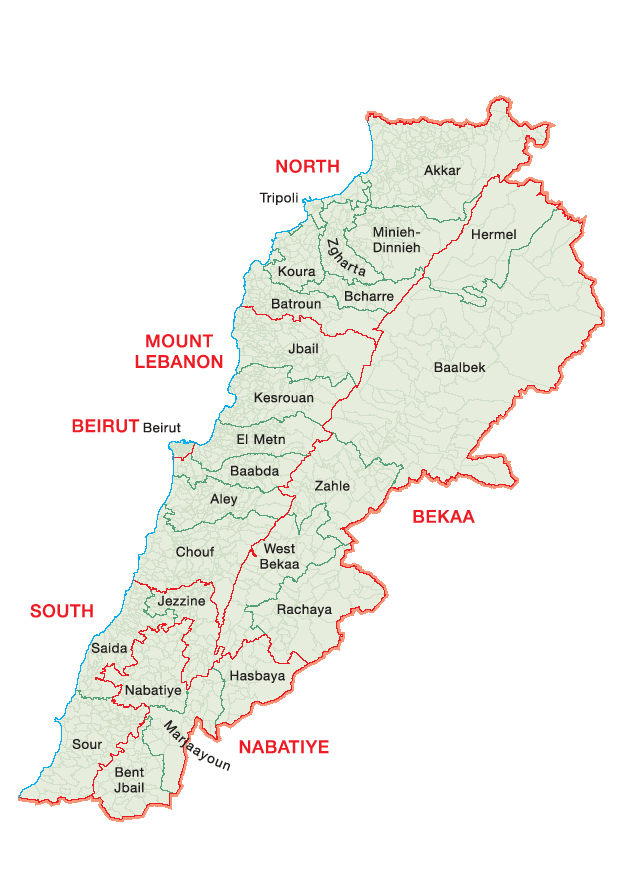
Districts of Lebanon

This is a list of cities and towns in Lebanon distributed according to the 26 districts which are split into 9 governorates. There are over 1000 municipalities (cities and towns). 56.21% of the population lives in 19 cities and towns, which gives the average 2,158 people per town.

== Largest cities (2021) ==
City	Region	Estimated Population 2016
Beirut	Beirut Governorate	2,402,485
Tripoli	North Governorate	229,398
Sidon	South Governorate	163,554
Baalbek	Baalbek-Hermel Governorate	150,806
Tyre	South Governorate	135,204
Nabatieh	Nabatieh Governorate	120,000
Jounieh	Mount Lebanon Governorate	115,000
Aley	Mount Lebanon Governorate	100,000
Zahle	Beqaa Governorate	78,145
Zgharta-Ehden	North Governorate	50,000
Byblos	Mount Lebanon Governorate	20,784
Batroun	North Governorate	10,820

NB: These numbers are sourced from World Population Review which source their data from Geonames.org

== Beirut Governorate (12) ==
This list includes the 12 Quarters (also known as neighborhoods with the number of registered voters in 2014

English name	Arabic Name	Population
Mazraa	المَزْرَعَة	87,222
Mousaitbeh	الِمْصَيطْبِِة	72,337
Bachoura	الباشورَة	54,304
Achrafieh	الأَشْرَفِيِّة	54,199
Zuqaq al-Blat	زْقاق الِبْلاط	50,795
Medawar	الِمْدَوَّر	41,358
Ras Beirut	رأس بيروت	33,724
Rmeil	الرّميل	28,847
Minet el-Hosn	ميناء الحُصن	13,105
Dar el-Mraisseh	دار الِمْريسِة	11,587
Marfa (Port)	المَرْفَأ	10,146
Saifi	الصَّيْفي	9,155

== See also ==
- List of municipalities of Lebanon
