= Byblian royal inscriptions =

Five inscriptions from Byblos written in an early type of Phoenician script

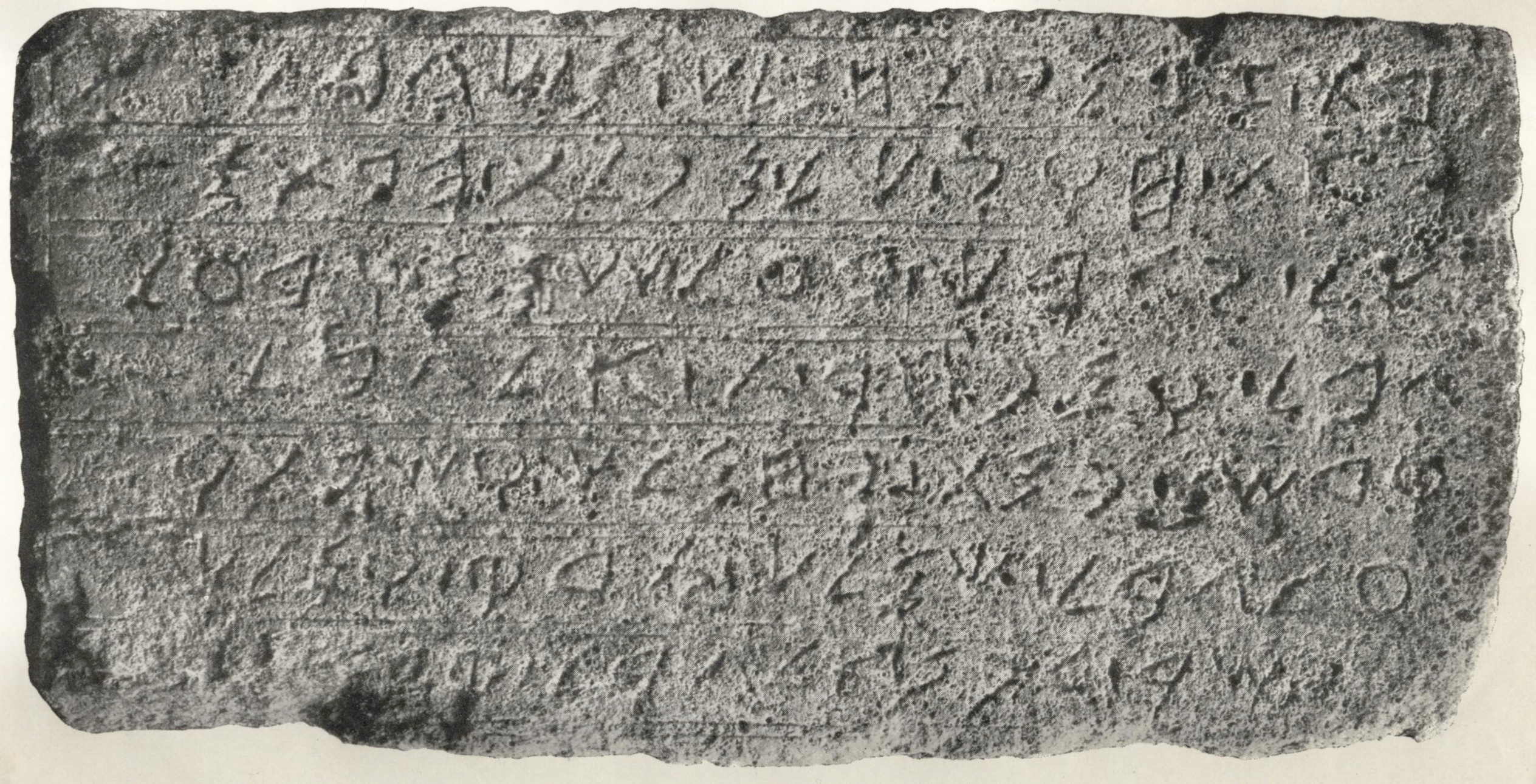
Yehimilk inscription

The Byblian royal inscriptions are five inscriptions from Byblos written in an early type of Phoenician script, in the order of some of the kings of Byblos, all of which were discovered in the early 20th century.

They constitute the largest corpus of lengthy Phoenician inscriptions from the area of the "Phoenician homeland"; it is the only major site in the region which has been excavated to pre-Hellenistic levels.

== The five royal inscriptions ==
- The Ahiram Sarcophagus (KAI 1), discovered in 1923, together with two fragments of alabaster vases with the name of Ramesses II. Currently in the National Museum of Beirut.
- The Yehimilk inscription (KAI 4) published in 1930. Currently in the museum of Byblos Castle.
- The Abiba’l inscription (KAI 5), on a throne on which a statue of Sheshonq I was placed, found in 1895, published in 1903. Currently in the Vorderasiatisches Museum Berlin.
- The Osorkon Bust or Eliba'l Inscription (KAI 6), inscribed on a statue of Osorkon I; known since 1881, published in 1925. Currently at the Louvre.
- The Safatba'al inscription or the "Shipitbaal inscription" (KAI 7), found in Byblos in 1936, published in 1945. Currently in the National Museum of Beirut.

KAI 2 is the Byblos Necropolis graffito and KAI 3 are the Byblos bronze spatulas; neither contain names of royalty or other historical information.

== Gallery ==
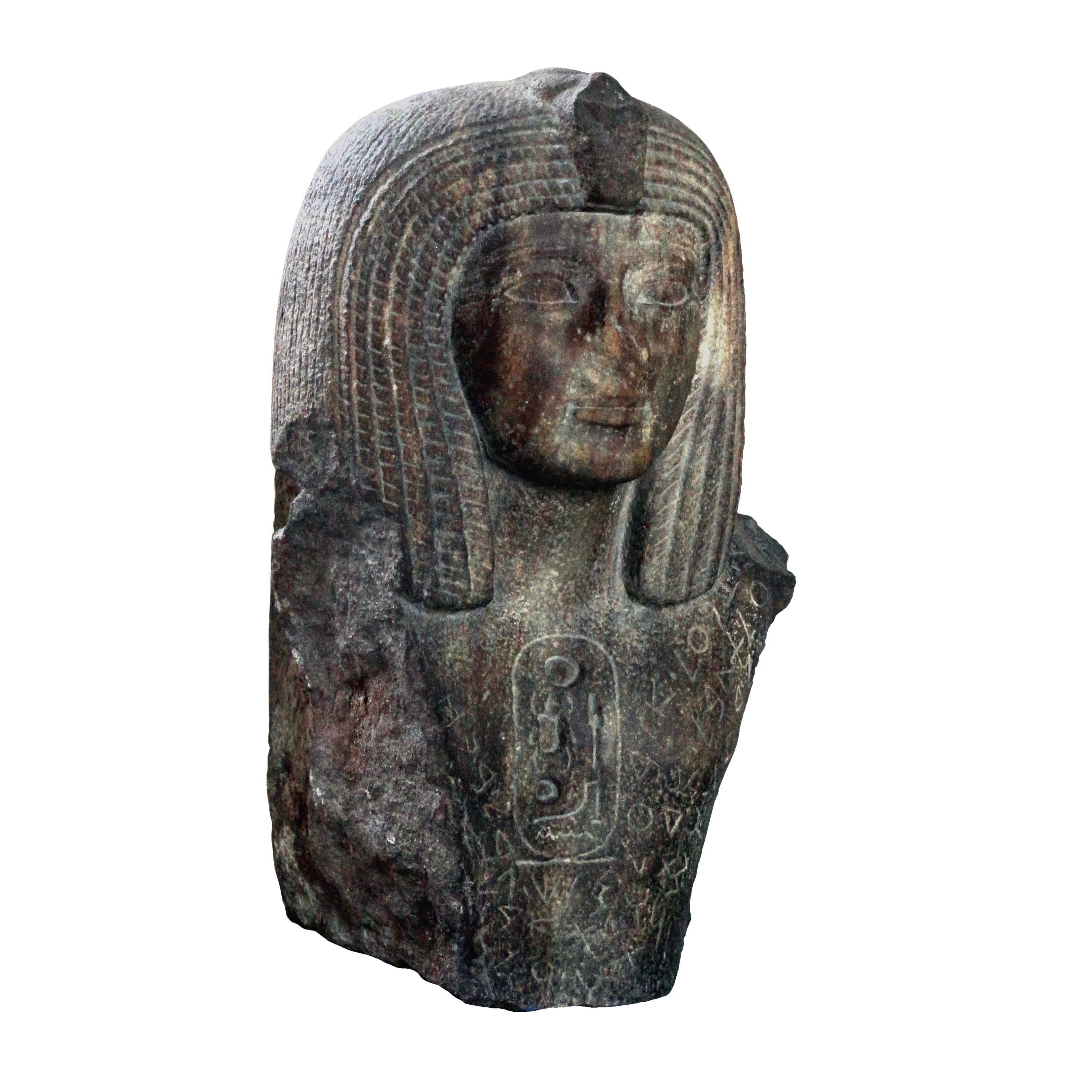
Osorkon Bust inscription (Phoenician inscription on left and right of cartouche)

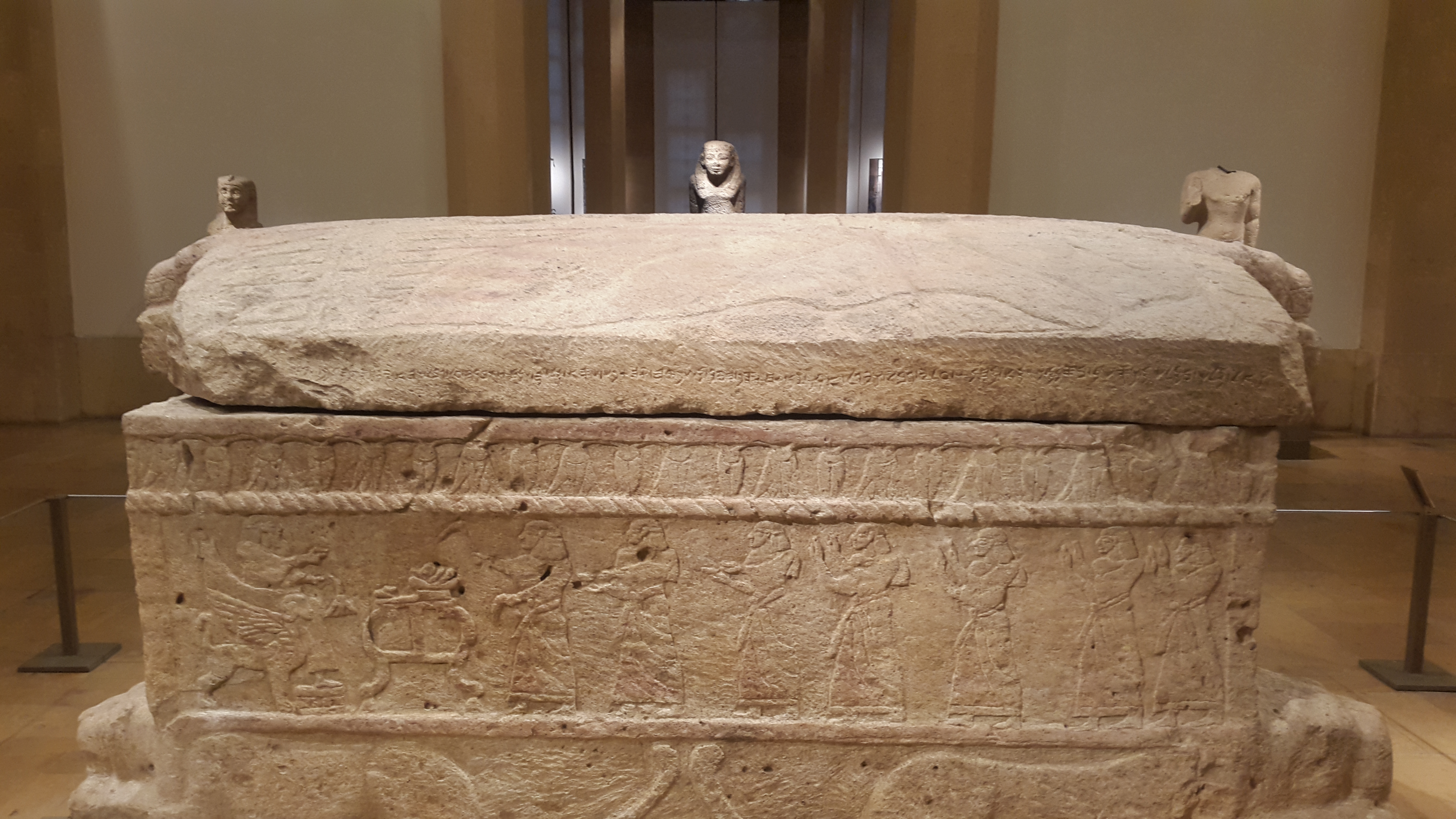
Ahiram sarcophagus inscription

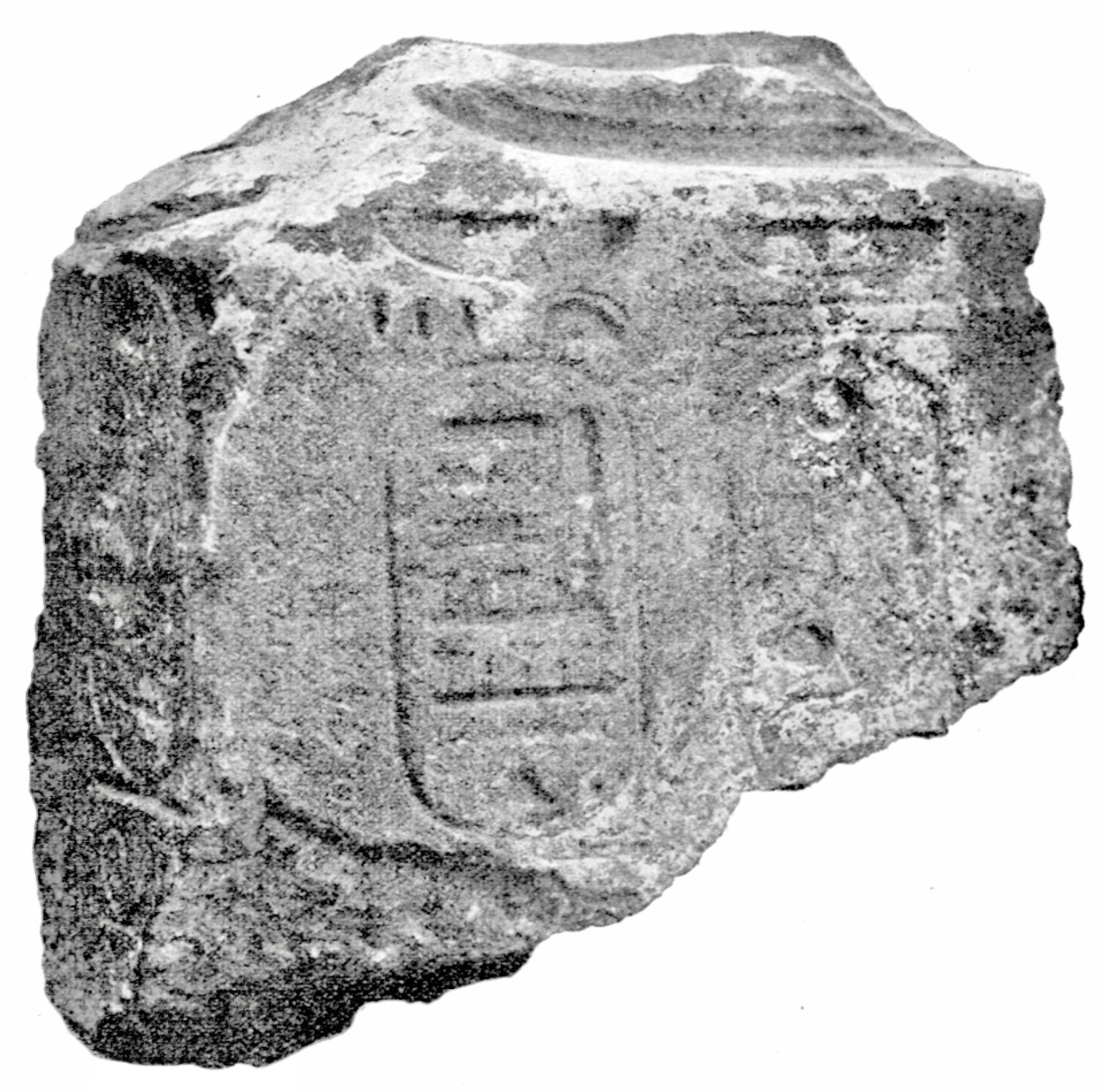
Abiba’l inscription (Phoenician inscription more clearly visible on the archaeological copy) (Note: See here)

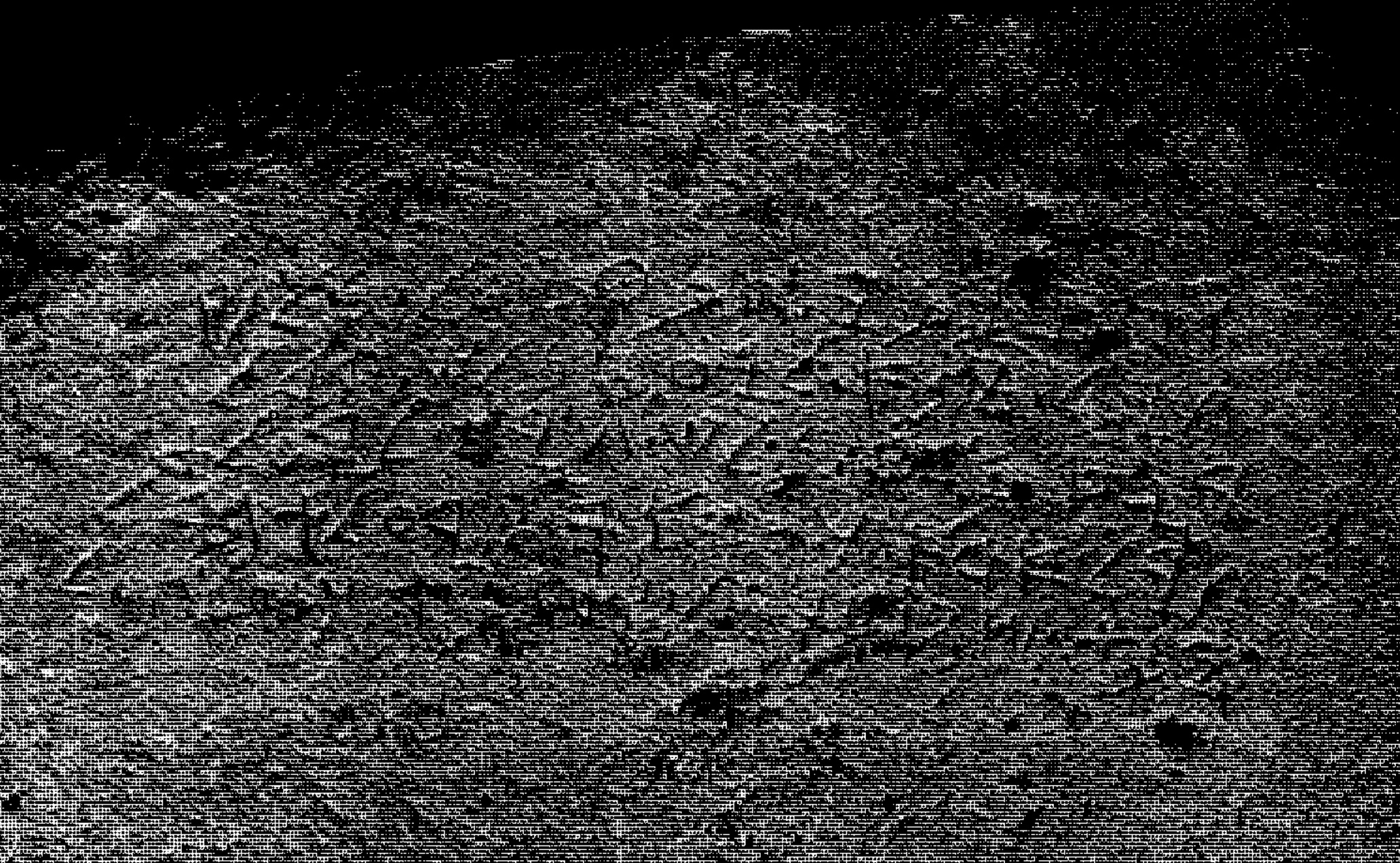
Safatba'al inscription

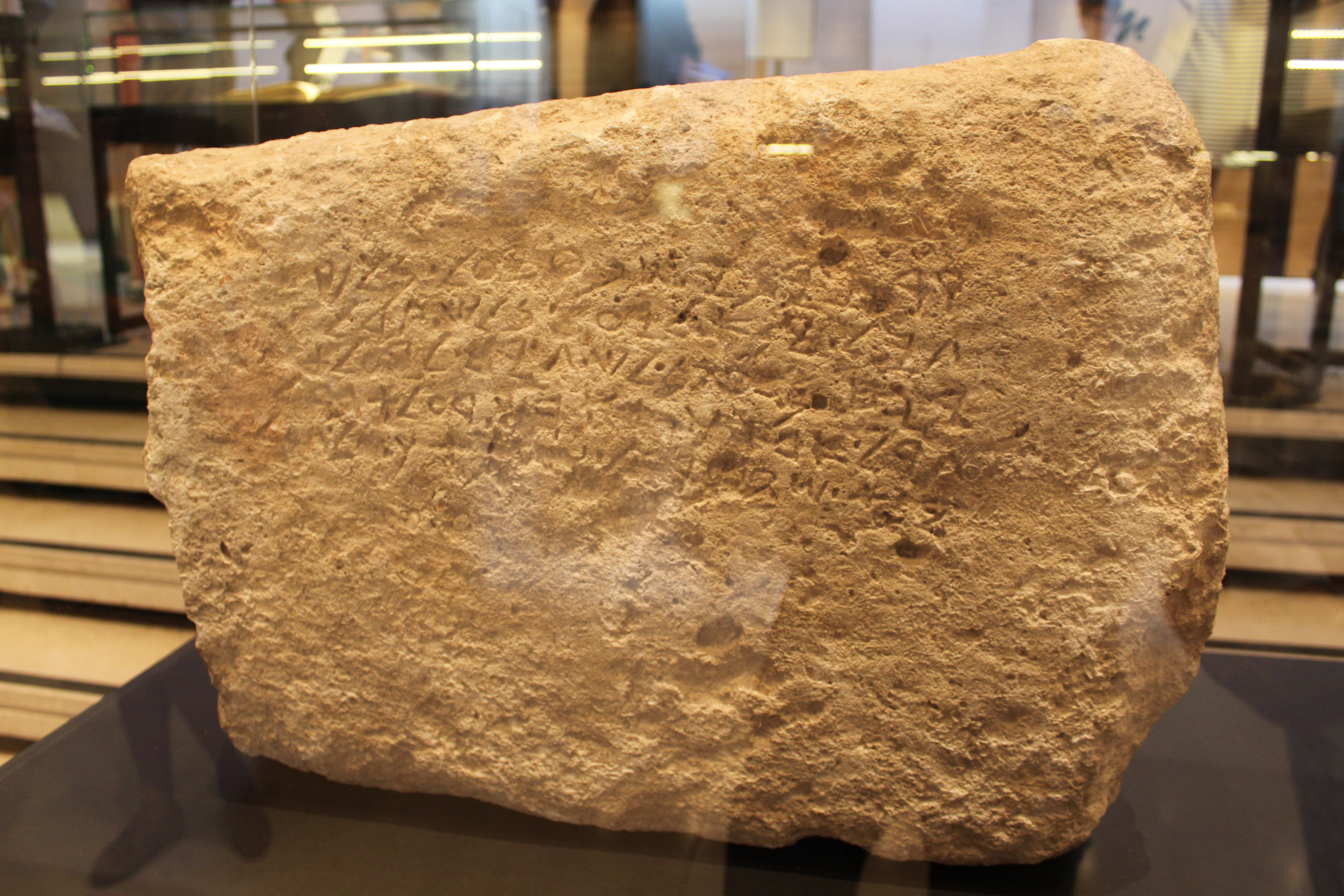
Safatba'al inscription

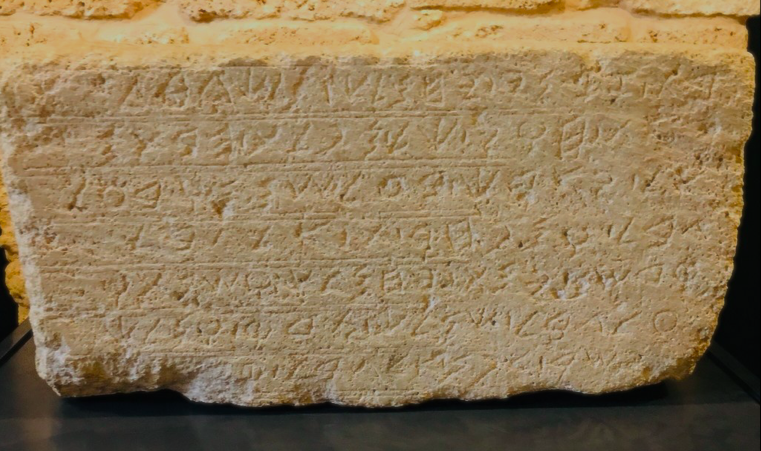
Yehimilk inscription in the Byblos Castle Museum

== Bibliography ==
- Christopher Rollston, "The Dating of the Early Royal Byblian Phoenician Inscriptions: A Response to Benjamin Sass." MAARAV 15 (2008): 57–93.
- Benjamin Mazar, The Phoenician Inscriptions from Byblos and the Evolution of the Phoenician-Hebrew Alphabet, in The Early Biblical Period: Historical Studies (S. Ahituv and B. A. Levine, eds., Jerusalem: IES, 1986 [original publication: 1946]): 231–247.
- William F. Albright, The Phoenician Inscriptions of the Tenth Century B.C. from Byblus, JAOS 67 (1947): 153–154.
- Vriezen, Theodoor Christiaan (1951). Palestine Inscriptions. Brill Archive. GGKEY:WGXUQKP9C87.
