= Beirut Governorate =

Governorate of Lebanon

Beirut Governate محافظة بيروت
- Governorate
- Map of Lebanon with Beirut Governorate highlighted
- Coordinates: 33°53′N 35°30′E
- Country: Lebanon
- Capital: Beirut

Government
  - Governor: Marwan Abboud (Independent)

Area
  - Total: 19.8 km^{2} (7.6 sq mi)

Population
  - Estimate (2017): 433,249
- Time zone: UTC+2 (EET)
  - Summer (DST): UTC+3 (EEST)

Beirut Governorate (Arabic: محافظة بيروت, romanized: Muḥāfaẓat Bayrūt) is a Lebanese governorate that consists of one district and one city, Beirut, which is also its capital, and the capital of Lebanon.

The area of this governorate is 19.8 km^{2} (without suburbs); despite its small size, it is considered the most important region in Lebanon because of its economic, political, cultural, and social activity. The governor of the Beirut Governate is Greek Orthodox according to tradition, while the mayor of the City of Beirut is Sunni Muslim. Beirut is known to be the most religiously diverse city in the Middle East. There are about 2.5 million people in Beirut and its suburbs (Greater Beirut).

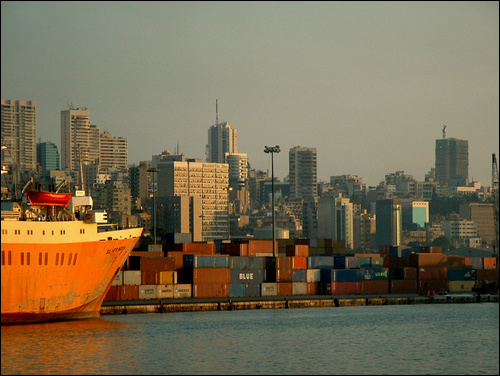
Beirut Skyline

== Cities ==
- Beirut (Greater Beirut)

== Demographics ==
According to registered voters in 2014:

Religion in the Beirut Governorate
1. Sunni Islam (45.4%)
2. Shia Islam (15.8%)
3. Christianity (36.1%)
4. Druze (1.12%)
5. Other (1.66%)

Year	Christians							Muslims				Druze
Year	Total	Armenian Orthodox	Greek Orthodox	Maronites	Greek Catholics	Armenian Catholics	Other Christians	Total	Sunnis	Shias	Alawites	Druze
2014	36.08%	9.60%	8.46%	6.11%	4.22%	1.77%	5.92%	61.17%	45.39%	15.75%	0.03%	1.12%

Beirut Governorate is a diverse governorate containing many religions in a tiny geography. These numbers are a representation of the number of voters in Beirut who are eligible to vote only.

== Quarters ==
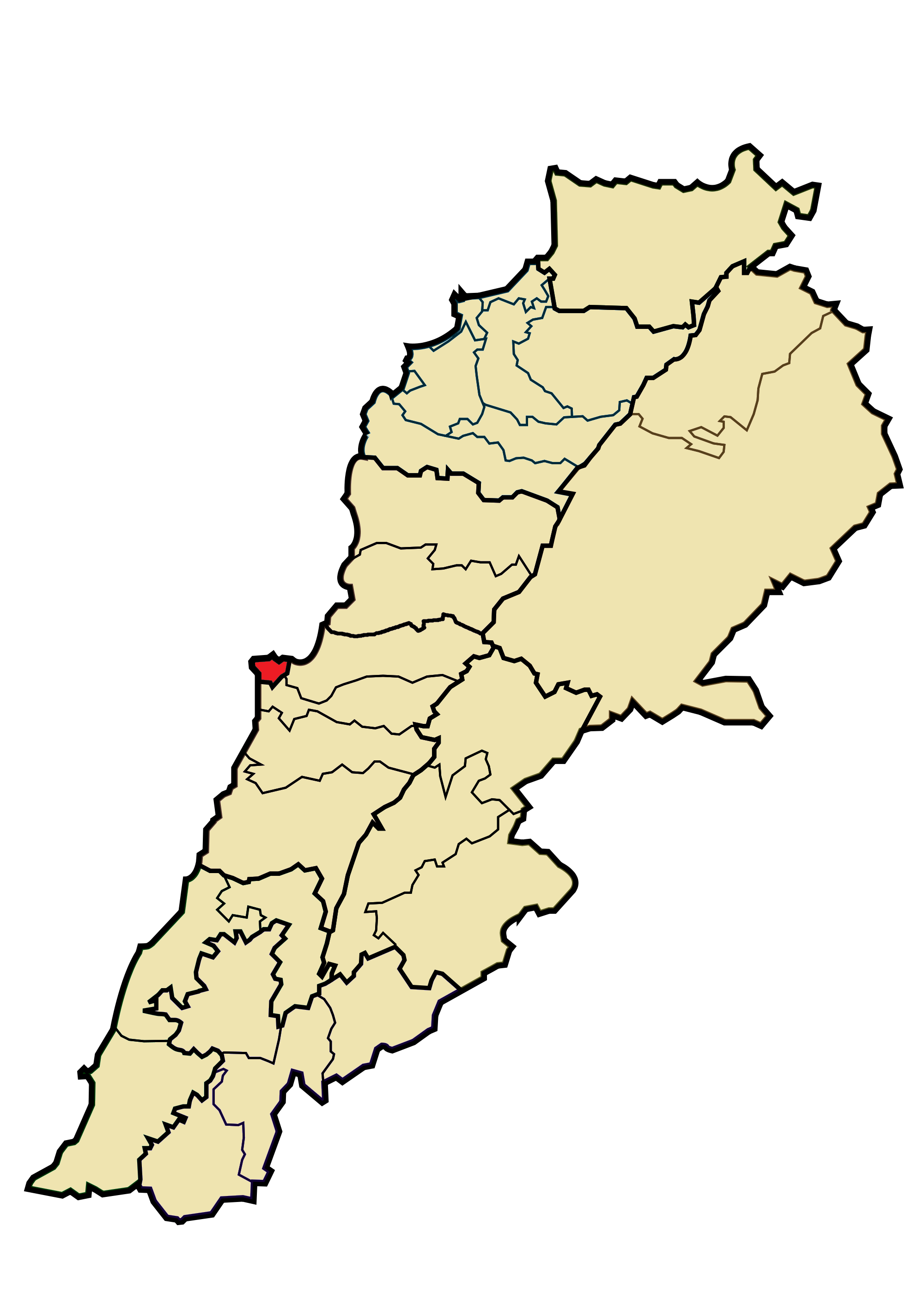
Beirut Governorate

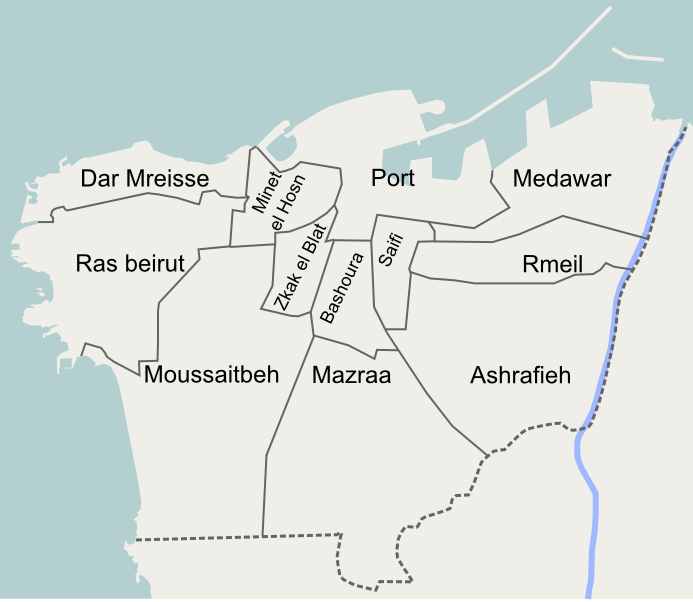
Map of the 12 quarters of Beirut

This list includes all Quarters (also known as neighborhoods) with the number of registered voters in 2014

English name	Arabic Name	Population
Mazraa	المَزْرَعَة	87,222
Mousaitbeh	الِمْصَيطْبِِة	72,337
Bachoura	الباشورَة	54,304
Achrafieh	الأَشْرَفِيِّة	54,199
Zuqaq al-Blat	زْقاق الِبْلاط	50,795
Medawar	الِمْدَوَّر	41,358
Ras Beirut	رأس بيروت	33,724
Rmeil	الرّميل	28,847
Minet el-Hosn	ميناء الحُصن	13,105
Dar el-Mraisseh	دار الِمْريسِة	11,587
Marfa (Port)	المَرْفَأ	10,146
Saifi	الصَّيْفي	9,155
