= Burj Abi Haidar =

Area in the Mazraa quarter of Beirut

Burj Abi Haidar برج أبي حيدر
- Location within Beirut
- Coordinates: 33.8835459°N 35.499586°E
- Country: Lebanon

Burj Abi Haidar (Arabic: برج أبي حيدر) is an area in the Mazraa quarter of Beirut, the capital of Lebanon. The area is predominantly Sunni Muslim with the presence of a Shia community, as well as a minority of Christians and Druze.

== Etymology ==
The name refers to one of the defensive towers built in the area, and the Beiruti family of Abi Haidar. It is commonly mistaken for "Borj Abi Hadir" to the east of Beirut.
