= List of regions of Lebanon by Human Development Index =

This is a list of regions of Lebanon by Human Development Index as of 2025 with data for the year 2023.

Rank	Region (Governorate)	HDI (2023)
High human development
1	Beqaa	0.780
2	Southern, Nabatieh	0.769
–	Lebanon (average)	0.752
3	Mount Lebanon	0.751
4	Northern (Akkar, North, Baalbek-Hermel)	0.741
5	Beirut	0.721
