= Abd al-Ghani Salam =

Lebanese journalist

- Born: 1942; Beirut
- Died: 25 July 2017 (aged 74–75); Beirut
- Other names: "The Firefighter"
- Education: Majoring in politics and economics
- Occupation: Journalist
- Awards: National Order of the Cedar

Abd al-Ghani Salam (Arabic: عبدُ الغني سلام) (1942 – 25 July 2017) is a Lebanese journalist from Beirut. He is the founder of the Al Liwaa newspaper. Abd al-Ghani Salam was born in Beirut in 1942, he studied at the National School of Choueifat, and continued his studies in the university majoring in politics and economics in 1962. He published a weekly magazine called Al Liwaa in November 1963, and it became a daily newspaper in 1970. He was famous for his support for the Arab cases and especially the Palestinians issue. He was known for his attempts – through his acquaintances and contacts – to extinguish the disputes between Arab leaders and the Palestinian, Arab or Islamic leaderships. For that reason, the Palestinian president Yasser Arafat called him "the firefighter". At the same time, he was known to neutralize the language in his newspaper, relying on the language of moderation and balance. He refused the intervention of " Al Liwaa " being a part in the media battles that was between the Arab capitals at that time. So he maintained relations with the leaders of the Arab regimes and in his internal relations. He also maintained an equal relation with the leaderships in Lebanon, especially in Beirut.

In addition to his journalistic work, he had an activity in the field of Islamic charitable and advocacy work in Beirut, especially during the month of Ramadan. He continued in his aforementioned profession and work until he died on 25 July 2017.

== Journalistic career ==
His journalistic career lasted about half a century, his life was in danger because of his positions. He was also sent to prison more than once, and the offices of Al Liwaa newspaper were bombed in 1981. When he was still twenty years old, he bought the banner franchise with the help of his father, who was in Brazil. His father believed in his passion for journalism. At first, he introduced Al Liwaa as a weekly magazine, then turned it into a daily newspaper in 1979. He refused to include in it any of the media battles that were raging at that time between the conflicting Arabs. At the same time, he maintained friendly and consultative relations with the leaders of the Arab regimes, and in his internal relations. He maintained an equal footing with the leaderships and political leaders in Beirut and Lebanon. He triumphed over the requirements of reform and modernization when Fouad Chehab was the president of Lebanon. He used to criticize the practices of some political and security apparatuses that were then dominated by political life in Lebanon. He also opposed the policy of censorship and the confiscation of free opinion. He wrote an article in the editorial of Al Liwaa on 24 February 1967 entitled "Did you hear about it, your Excellency?", In which he attacked the President of the Republic, Charles Helou, blaming him for a financial banking crisis that struck the prosperous Lebanese economy and its financial consequences for its collapse, which included the Middle East Airlines, Casino du Liban, Al Turaba Company, the Phenicia Hotel, and the Baalbek Studio. He demanded the resignation of the government. As a result of this attack, Salam was arrested in al-Raml prison in Tareeq al-Jadida area, and Al Liwaa was stopped for one month. He was released again after a few days as a result of the political and popular demands, so he went out in a major popular demonstration and was returned to his home in Ras el-Nabaa, Beirut.

He occupied the position of Secretary of the Lebanese Press Syndicate in 1979. Then he became the Acting President of the Lebanese Press Syndicate in 1982. During the years of the Lebanese Civil War, he defended Beirut against security Chaos and Militias, and called through his newspaper to reject sectarian incitement. He was awarded the National Order of the Cedar in 2013, in recognition of his efforts, by the President of the Republic, Michel Suleiman. The writer and journalist Henry Zogheib described him, saying:

"His constant concern was to unify the word at various levels: local, national and regional, to bring the Lebanese leaders together, and to alleviate the differences that often ignite crises in a country exhausted by conflicts."

== Islamic works ==
Abd al-Ghani Salam was one of the most prominent Lebanese and Beirut activists in writing Islamic work. He supported the publication of the “Encyclopedia of Muslim Scholars in Lebanon,” which was compiled in 16 parts by the great historian Omar Abd el-Salam Tadmouri. He set up tables for iftar called (mawayid alrhmn) in the month of Ramadan to strengthen social solidarity in Beirut and Lebanon. He continued this approach for thirty-five years, and contributed to the support of charitable, social and educational institutions that are active in the service of society. Through his newspaper, he countered the phenomenon of moral turmoil, and made it a permanent Islamic corner that includes religious lessons, clarifications and advice, it also criticizes and corrects the features of contemporary life that are incompatible with the Muslim faith. Al Liwaa newspaper was also unique in listing the names of the Preachers of the group in all Beirut Mosques affiliated with Dar Al-Fatwa and the Al-Maqasid Islamic Charitable Association. Salam brought together Islamic and Christian spiritual leaders in a conference hosted by Dar Al-Liwa. It resulted in the development of a "moral pact". This act addressed the manifestations of chaos and pornography in the Lebanese and the Arab society. This activity in the field of Islamic work prompted the former President of the Lebanese Republic, Amin Gemayel, to consider Salam as a "reference in the conditions of political Islam."

== His death ==
Abd al-Ghani Salam died on the night of Tuesday on 25 July 2017, after a long struggle with an incurable disease. He was buried in Martyrs Cemetery.
