= Ras el-Nabaa =

Neighborhood in Beirut, Lebanon

Ras el-Nabaa رأس النبع
- Coordinates: 33.882557°N 35.509377°E
- Country: Lebanon

Ras el-Nabaa (Arabic: رأس النبع) is an area in the Mazraa neighborhood of Beirut, the capital of Lebanon.

== The label ==
The area's name comes from the source of a stream that flowed from it towards the village of Karawiya and then to Al-Darka Square on the southern side of Beirut's wall.
