= Israeli attacks on the Lebanese health sector during the Israel-Hezbollah conflict (2023–present) =

Israeli attacks on Lebanese health facilities and workers

Israeli attacks on the Lebanese health sector during the 2023–2024 Israel–Hezbollah conflict were proportionally more deadly than any other war in the world between October 7, 2023, and November 18, 2024, including the Gaza war and the Russian invasion of Ukraine. According to international humanitarian law, hospitals, the patients they shelter, health professionals, and ambulances cannot be endangered by belligerents. This principle applies to services affiliated with armed groups, such as Hezbollah. Despite Israel alleging the use of Lebanese medical facilities by Hezbollah for military purposes, several human rights organizations issued condemnations for not providing substantial proof of such use, and for not respecting the protection afforded to sick or injured people treated in these facilities.

226 healthcare workers and patients were killed in attacks against Lebanon, along with 199 injured between October 7, 2023, and November 18, 2024, according to the Healthcare Attacks Monitoring System. 6% of Lebanese killed in Israeli attacks in Lebanon were rescue workers and emergency medical aid personnel.

== International humanitarian law ==
Paraphrased, Article 19 of the Fourth Geneva Convention states that: “Hospitals and other medical facilities are civilian objects protected by international humanitarian law”.

Heidi Matthews, a Canadian law professor at Osgoode Hall Law School, stated that doctors and first responders working for Hezbollah-affiliated organizations are afforded the same protection as all health professionals; and thus international law prohibits targeting them. She further stated that, a belligerent who targets health establishments, alleging their use for military purposes, must provide clear proof of this. Even if this were the case, the wounded or sick persons who are treated there remain protected, and must be given time to evacuate before an attack.

Human Rights Watch has reported clear war crimes among some Israeli strikes against the Lebanese health sector.

== Statistics ==
=== Comparison with contemporary wars ===
According to the World Health Organization, “47% of attacks on health care – 65 out of 137 – have proven fatal to at least one health worker or patient in Lebanon” between October 7, 2023, and November 21, 2024.

This proportion is higher than that observed in any other contemporary war in the world. Almost half of Israeli attacks on healthcare resulted in the death of a healthcare professional or patient. This stood significantly higher than the global average of 13.3%, according to figures from the Health Care Attacks Monitoring System based on data from 13 countries or territories affected by conflict between October 7, 2023, and November 18, 2024; these 13 territories include Ukraine, Sudan and the occupied Palestinian territory.

226 health workers and patients were killed in Lebanon and 199 more were injured between October 7, 2023, and November 18, 2024, according to the Healthcare Attacks Monitoring System.

=== Share of human losses and damages related to health care ===
Among the Israeli attacks affecting the health sector, the majority killed or injured medical personnel. 68% of these attacks affected health personnel according to the SSA. 63% affected medical transport, while 26% affected health establishments.

== Timeline of health care-related human losses and damage ==
The figures in this timeline distinguish between direct attacks, which kill health personnel and damage hospitals or ambulances, and the dropping of bombs in the vicinity of health establishments that force these establishments into inactivity.

- November 10, 2023: The IDF shelled Meiss Ej Jabal Hospital which injured a doctor. The Lebanese health ministry condemned the attack, saying that “Israeli authorities were fully responsible for this unjustifiable act, which would have led to catastrophic results", and called for an investigation.
- January 11, 2024: The IDF conducted strikes in the town of Hanine and targeted an emergency center affiliated with the Hezbollah-backed Islamic Health Committee. The attack killed two workers from the rescue force and destroyed an ambulance.
- September 24: Two employees of the United Nations High Commissioner for Refugees (UNHCR) were killed in bombings.
- September 29: Fourteen rescuers are killed in two days in the bombings, according to the Lebanese Ministry of Health.
- September 30: Six rescuers are killed in an Israeli strike in the Beqaa Valley.
- Between October 1–3, forty rescuers and firefighters were killed in three days.
- Early October: At least twelve rescue workers from the Lebanese Civil Defense, which is part of the Lebanese state unrelated to Hezbollah, and sixteen ambulance workers from the Lebanese Red Cross were killed in Israeli strikes.
- October 4: On this day alone, eleven rescuers were killed. The rescuers worked for the Islamic Health Committee, affiliated with Hezbollah, in the southern suburbs of Beirut or in the south of the country. Seven of them were killed in a strike on the threshold of a public hospital in Marjayoun, which was forced to cease all activity due to damage suffered.
- Figures published on October 4, 2024: According to the World Health Organization, 28 health professionals were killed in Lebanon over the prior day. On the same day, WHO Director Tedros Adhanom Ghebreyesus reported that in Beirut, five hospitals had partially or completely ceased to function, and that 37 more health establishments were forced to close in southern Lebanon.
- October 7: Ten firefighters were killed in an airstrike on their fire station in Baraashit.
- October 9: Five rescuers were killed in a strike in southern Lebanon.
- Figures published on October 10: According to the World Health Organization, the Israeli air force bombed 37 health facilities, killed 70 health professionals and injured 65 people working in the same sector of activity between October 8, 2023, and October 10, 2024.
- Figures published on October 14: According to the United Nations, “Israeli attacks have forced 98 health care facilities across Lebanon to shutter”. In addition, 150 doctors, rescue workers, and firefighters were reported to have been killed since the start of the conflict up to October 14.
- Figures published on October 29: Between the start of the war and October 29, 2024, "58 airstrikes against hospitals and clinics, 158 against ambulances, and 72 against firefighting or rescue vehicles" had been carried out by Israel, most of which took place from September 23, 2024, onwards.
- Figures published on November 1: Israeli military operations in Lebanon were reported to have left 178 dead and 292 injured in the Lebanese health sector, and affected 243 vehicles, 84 care centers or outpatient structures, and 40 hospitals according to the Lebanese Ministry of Health.
- Figures published on November 15: At least 192 rescue workers and health personnel were reported to have been killed in Israeli airstrikes since the start of the conflict in Lebanon. Israel alleged military use of ambulances by Hezbollah despite having "not provided evidence" according to CNN. Lebanon filed a complaint with the UN Security Council in response to "repeated and deliberate Israeli attacks on Lebanese Civil Defense."
- Figures published on November 22: Israel dropped bombs at a lethal distance from at least nineteen Lebanese hospitals, within a radius of 340 meters around these facilities, and at a dangerous distance from 24 hospitals within a radius of 500 meters, according to an investigation published on November 22, 2024.

The United Nations High Commissioner for Refugees expressed alarm at "many instances of violations of international humanitarian law in the way the airstrikes are conducted that have destroyed or damaged civilian infrastructure, have killed civilians, have impacted humanitarian operations". The World Health Organization stated that "There need to be consequences for not abiding by international law", and that "indiscriminate attacks on health care are a violation of human rights and international law that cannot become the new normal, not in Gaza, not in Lebanon, nowhere." The UN humanitarian coordinator for Lebanon, Imran Riza, deplored "an alarming increase in attacks against healthcare" in Lebanon.

== List of affected medical services ==
- Night of October 2–3, 2024: An Israeli strike against the medical center in central Beirut in the Bachoura neighborhood killed at least nine people, including seven rescue workers. The medical center belonged to the Islamic Health Committee, linked to Hezbollah, and which provides emergency medical aid.
- October 3, 2024: An Israeli strike in Al-Aadaissah, southern Lebanon, against ambulances of the Islamic Health Committee. Three doctors were killed.
- October 4, 2024: An Israeli strike on an ambulance of the Islamic Health Committee near the entrance of Marjayoun Hospital in southern Lebanon killed seven medical rescuers and forced the hospital to close.
- October 4, 2024: Israeli strike on Salah Ghandour Hospital in Bint Jbeil, southern Lebanon, following an evacuation order. Nine medical staff were injured, several seriously. The hospital was forced to close due to damage suffered in the strike.
- October 4, 2024: The private Sainte-Thérèse hospital near the southern suburbs of Beirut, run by nuns, was forced to stop its activities due to Israeli strikes causing severe damage and due to the amount of danger within its perimeter.
- October 4, 2024: Meiss al Jabal Hospital, near Lebanon's southern border, ceased operations due to Israeli strikes.
- October 22, 2024: An unwarned Israeli strike near Rafik Hariri University Hospital, the country's largest hospital, in the Jnah neighborhood of Beirut killed eighteen people, including four children, and injured sixty while causing significant damage to the hospital.

"Emergency services affiliated with Hezbollah and its allies were hardest hit, according to a Health Ministry tally, but teams from the Lebanese Red Cross and the government-run Civil Defense also came under fire," according to the Washington Post.
