= Pierre el-Rahi =

Lebanese Maronite priest (1975–2026)

The Reverend Pierre el-Rahi
- Church: Maronite Church
- Archdiocese: Archeparchy of Tyre

Personal details
- Born: 1975 Dibeh, Lebanon
- Died: 9 March 2026 (aged 50) Al-Qlayaa, Lebanon
- Cause of death: Israeli tank fire (see details)

Pierre el-Rahi (sometimes spelled Pierre al-Rahi) (Arabic: بيار الراعي, French: Pierre el-Raï; 1975 – 9 March 2026) was a Lebanese Maronite Catholic priest who was killed by Israeli tank fire during the 2026 Lebanon war.

== Biography ==
Born in 1975 in the village of Dibeh in northern Lebanon, El-Rahi was originally from Debel in the south of Lebanon. He became curate of the Paroisse Saint-Georges in Al-Qlayaa in 2013, his ministry located in the Marjayoun District, just north of the Israeli border.

In December 2023, he appeared in the press urging Christian residents of Al-Qlayaa to continue celebrating Christmas in spite of the Hezbollah–Israel conflict. In October 2024, he defended the rights of residents to remain on their own land amidst evacuation orders, citing the village's attempt to avoid any form of armed conflict.

The following month, he continued to encourage residents to stay home despite the approaching warfare. In early March 2025, he received a delegation from the Kataeb Party, which met with several officials in southern Lebanese villages. On 20 October 2025, he was received at Baabda Palace by President Joseph Aoun, discussing religious issues and the safety of the people of Al-Qlayaa.

== Death ==
On 9 March 2026, el-Rahi rushed to a family's house in Al-Qlayaa to render aid, when he himself was fatally struck by a second shelling. His death was denounced by the Lebanese Forces as a casualty of a war "imported into Lebanon and Qlayaa" and "waged by outlaws".
