= Safatba'al inscription =

Phoenician inscription found in Byblos

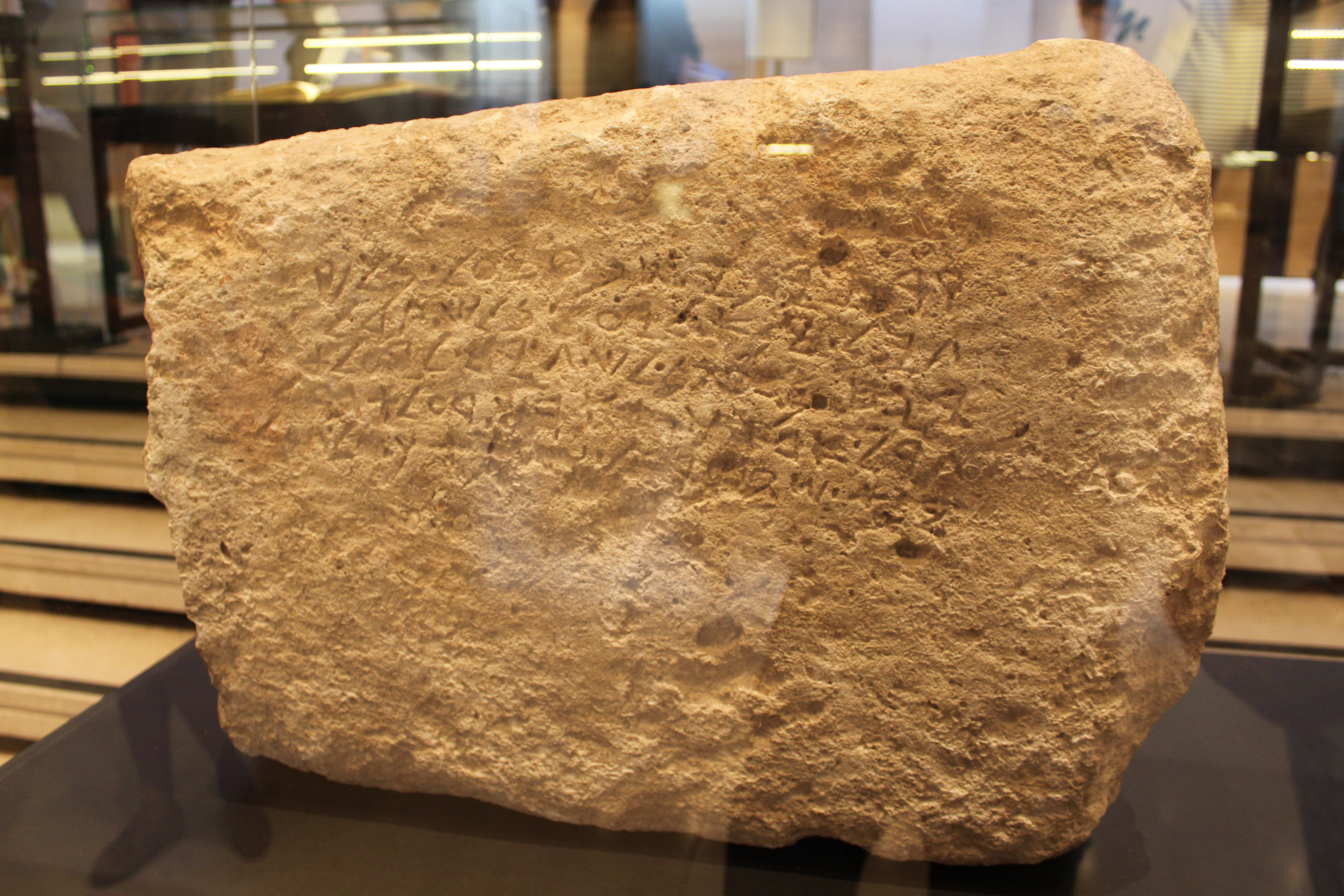
- Created: c. 900 BC
- Discovered: 1936; Byblos, Keserwan-Jbeil, Lebanon
- Present location: Beirut, Beirut Governorate, Lebanon

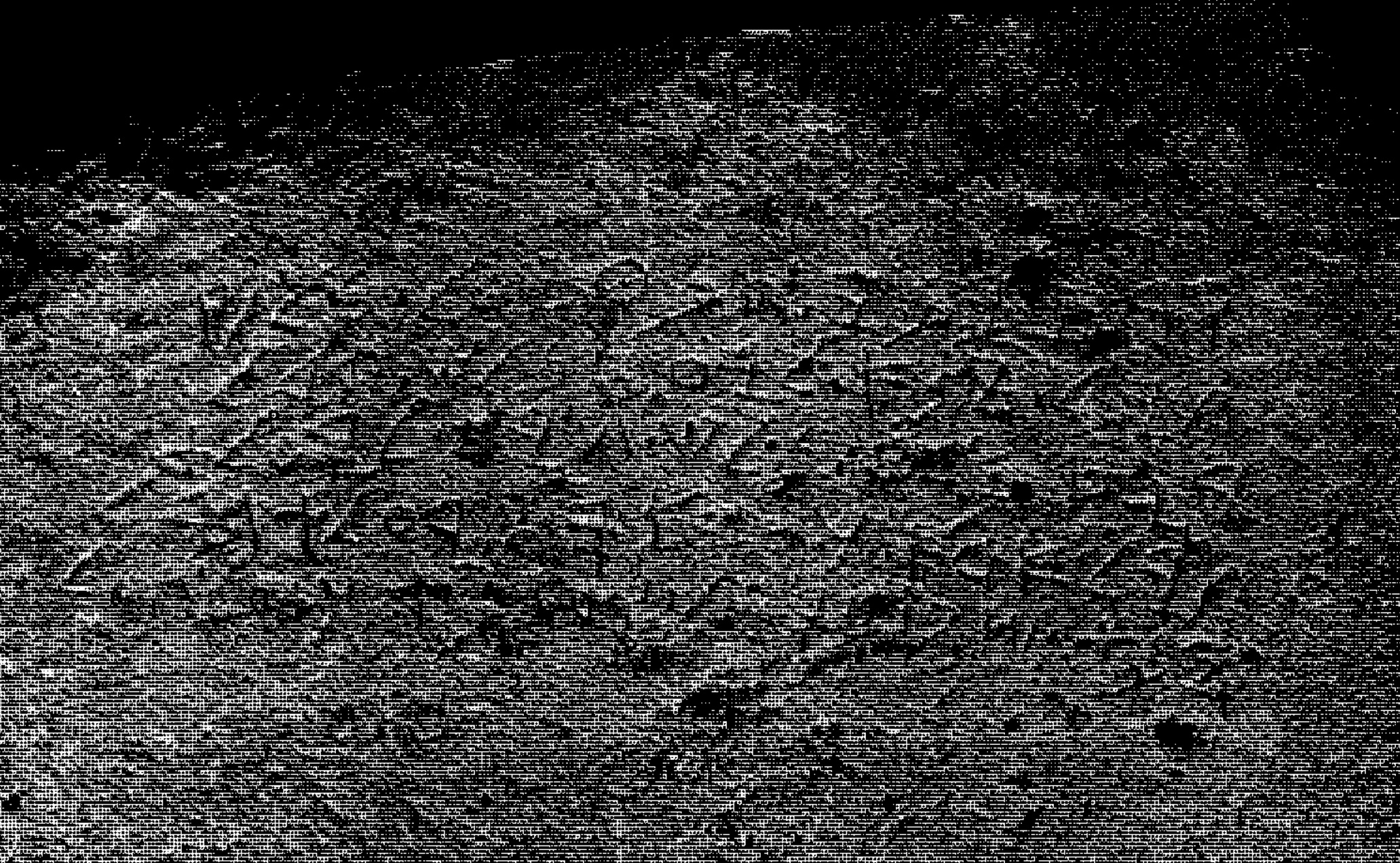
Safatba'al Inscription

The Safatba'al inscription or the Shipitbaal inscription is a Phoenician inscription (KAI 7, TSSI III 9) found in Byblos in 1936, published in 1945.

It is at the National Museum of Beirut.

== Text of the inscription ==
The inscription reads:

QR Z BNY ŠPṬB‘L MLK
This wall was built by Safatbaal, king

GBL BN ’LB‘L MLK GBL
of Byblos, son of Elibaal, king of Byblos,

BYḤMLK MLK GBL LB‘LT
son of Yehimelk, king of Byblos, for Baalat

GBL ’DTW T’RK B‘LT GBL
Gebal, his Lady. May Baalat Gebal prolong

YMT ŠPṬB‘L WŠNTW ‘L GBL
the days of Safatbaal and his years over Byblos.

== Bibliography ==
- Christopher Rollston, "The Dating of the Early Royal Byblian Phoenician Inscriptions: A Response to Benjamin Sass." MAARAV 15 (2008): 57–93.
- Benjamin Mazar, The Phoenician Inscriptions from Byblos and the Evolution of the Phoenician-Hebrew Alphabet, in The Early Biblical Period: Historical Studies (S. Ahituv and B. A. Levine, eds., Jerusalem: IES, 1986 [original publication: 1946]): 231–247.
- William F. Albright, The Phoenician Inscriptions of the Tenth Century B.C. from Byblus, JAOS 67 (1947): 153–154.
- Vriezen, Theodoor Christiaan (1951). Palestine Inscriptions. Brill Archive. GGKEY:WGXUQKP9C87.
