= 2024 Derdghaya Melkite Church airstrike =

Attack on Lebanon during 2024 Israeli invasion

- Part of the 2024 Israeli invasion of Lebanon
- Location within Lebanon
- Location: Derdghaya, Lebanon
- Date: 9 October 2024
- Target: St. George Melkite Catholic Church
- Attack type: Airstrikes, massacre
- Deaths: 8+
- Perpetrator: Israel Defense Forces

On 9 October 2024, the Israel Defense Forces (IDF) conducted an airstrike on the 150 year old St. George Melkite Catholic Church in the village of Derdghaya, in Southern Lebanon, as part of the 2024 Israeli invasion of Lebanon. The airstrike killed at least eight people inside the church. The IDF also hit the house of a priest and the parish offices.

== Background ==
As a result of the 2024 Israeli invasion of Lebanon, 1.2 million Lebanese citizens have been displaced from their homes. The Melkite Church in Derdghaya, Tyre District was housing some of these displaced in the church and two of the adjoining halls.

The church had been previously bombed by Israel in 1978 and again in 1992. According to the priest of the church, Father Maurice el Khoury, the church lost its western wall during the First Israeli invasion of Lebanon in 1978, and residential rooms of the church were hit by Israeli airstrikes in 1992.

== Airstrike ==
The Catholic pastoral aid organization, Aid to the Church in Need reported that on 9 October 2024, an Israeli missile hit the church, completely destroying it and killing at least eight people inside. Another missile hit a priests house and a three-story building which had the parish offices, completely destroying them as well.

The Israeli army claimed that the attack was directed against militiamen.

== Reactions ==
=== Religious leaders ===
On 11 October 2024, Pope Francis released two statements on Twitter stating,

All nations have the right to exist in peace and security. Their territories must not be attacked, and their sovereignty must be respected and guaranteed through peace and dialogue. War and hatred bring only death and destruction for everyone. #Peace

and

I call for an immediate ceasefire in all theatres of conflict in the Middle East, including Lebanon. Let us #PrayTogether for the Lebanese people, especially for residents in the south who have been forced to flee their homes. May they soon be able to return and live in #Peace.

The Latin Patriarch of Jerusalem, Cardinal Pierbattista Pizzaballa, issued a statement that same day saying “We will not surrender to events that seem to drive us apart, but we will always seek to be thirsty builders of peace and justice.”

== Aftermath ==
In December of 2024, locals placed a small Christmas tree amidst the rubble of the church. The tree lacked lights due to the destruction of power lines during the war and did not have a traditional Nativity scene either due to the risk of it falling apart on the uneven ground.

== See also ==
- Killing of Pierre al-Rahi
- Israeli war crimes
- List of massacres in Lebanon
