= Milia Maroun =

Lebanese fashion designer (died 2026)

Milia Maroun (Arabic: ميليا مارون; died 30 April 2026) was a Lebanese fashion designer.

== Life and career ==
Maroun was born in Beirut. She studied at ESMOD in Paris. In 2000 she founded milia m.

Maroun died on 30 April 2026.
