= Killing of Pierre el-Rahi =

Attack on Lebanon during 2026 Israeli invasion

- Part of the 2026 Lebanon war
- Location: Al-Qlayaa, Lebanon
- Date: 9 March 2026
- Target: House in Al-Qlayaa
- Attack type: Shelling
- Deaths: 1
- Injuries: 4
- Perpetrator: Israel Defense Forces

On 9 March 2026, Israeli forces killed priest Pierre el-Rahi (Note: Sometimes spelled "Pierre al-Rahi") in the village of Al-Qlayaa in Marjayoun, Southern Lebanon.

An Israeli tank fired twice on a house in the Maronite Christian village of Al-Qlayaa resulting in the death of el-Rahi as well as four other people being injured. The killing was condemned by Catholics.

== Background ==
Since the start of the 2026 Lebanon war, thousands of residents from Southern Lebanon have fled the region. However, many of the Christians of the area, including the residents of Al-Qlayaa refused to leave despite warnings from Israel to do so.

The day before the attack, Rahi spoke to the French news channel France24 stating: “We are forced to stay despite the danger, when we defend our land, and we do so peacefully. None of us carries weapons. All of us carry peace and goodness and love".

That same day a Christian man, Sami Ghafari, was killed by an Israeli airstrike while in the garden of his home. His brother, Father Maroun Ghafari, is the parish priest of Aalma ash-Shaab and like al-Rahi encouraged Christians not to evacuate their villages and instead defend them.

== Attack ==
On 9 March 2026 around 2 P.M., an Israeli Merkava tank struck a house on the eastern edge of Al-Qlayya, injuring the owner and his wife. Father Pierre and ten other men rushed to the house to help and another shell hit the house, wounding Rahi and four others. Rahi and the others were rushed to a local hospital but he did not survive, dying before reaching the hospital door.

== Reactions ==
=== Political leaders ===
The mayor of Al-Qlayaa, Hanna Daher, labeled the claim of "groups" in the house as lies and told Lebanese news outlet L'Orient–Le Jour: "We do not know what the justification is for this shelling...we are peaceful people, and we do not harm anyone...All we ask is to be able to stay in our homes in peace. We will stay here, and we will not leave. We do not know if there is a plan to displace us, but we will remain on our land, and we will not leave it."

However, the president of the Lebanese Forces, Samir Geagea stated that Hezbollah had infiltrated the town which led to the Israeli attack. Geagea also said that "residents have repeatedly asked the Lebanese army not to allow illegal armed elements to enter their villages. Yet, to date, the army has failed in this mission, and the tragedy in Qlayaa today is the most blatant proof of this."

=== Religious leaders ===
Pope Leo XIV released a statement saying: "Profound sorrow for all the victims of the bombings in the Middle East over the last few days — for the many innocent people, including many children, and for those who were providing them with aid, such as Father Pierre El-Rahi, a Maronite priest killed this afternoon in Qlayaa."

The French Catholic organization L'Œuvre d'Orient condemned the attack stating: "L'Œuvre d'Orient condemns in the strongest terms these acts of war, which aim to destabilize all of Lebanon and kill innocent civilians. The death of a priest who refused to abandon his parish is a further escalation of senseless violence."

Father Jean Younes, a Lebanese Maronite Catholic priest and secretary general of the Assembly of Catholic Patriarchs and Bishops of Lebanon, told OSV News: "Father Pierre al-Rahi was from my village, Dibeh, but he was the parish priest of Qlayaa in Marjayoun. Unfortunately, he passed away. God bless his soul."

Father Toufic Bou Merhi, a Franciscan Custodian of the Holy Land and Latin rite priest serving the communities of Tyre and Deir Mimas described Father Pierre as "truly the support of the Christians of the region" and lamented his death as greatly affecting the Christians of Southern Lebanon but urged them to "hope in the Lord, who always gives us the strength to carry on".

== See also ==
- 2024 Derdghaya Melkite Church airstrike
- 2026 Ghazali family killing
- Israeli war crimes
