= Governorates of Lebanon =

First-level administrative division of Lebanon

Governorate محافظات (Arabic)
- Also known as: Muhafazah
- Location: Lebanon
- Number: 9 (as of 2024)
- Populations: 300,000 (Keserwan-Jbeil Governorate) - 1,531,000 (Mount Lebanon Governorate)
- Subdivisions: District

Lebanon is divided into nine governorates (Arabic: muhafazah).

Each governorate is headed by a governor (Arabic: muhafiz).

Governorate	Arabic name	Capital city	ISO code	Area (km^{2})	Population (2022)	Density (per km^{2})	Current governor
Akkar	عكار	Halba	LB-AK	776	432,000	557	Imad Labaki
Baalbek-Hermel	بعلبك - الهرمل	Baalbek	LB-BH	3,009	472,000	157	Bashir Khodr
Beirut	بيروت	Beirut	LB-BA	18	419,000	23,278	Marwan Abboud
Beqaa	البقاع	Zahleh	LB-BI	1,271	540,000	425	Kamal Abou Jaoudeh
Keserwan-Jbeil	كسروان - جبيل	Jounieh	—N/a	722	300,000	415	Pauline Deeb
Mount Lebanon	جبل لبنان	Baabda	LB-JL	1,238	1,531,000	1,237	Charbel Tabet
Nabatieh	النبطية	Nabatiye	LB-NA	1,058	391,000	370	Mahmoud Al-Mawla
North	الشمال	Tripoli	LB-AS	1,205	803,000	666	Ramzi Nohra
South	الجنوب	Sidon	LB-JA	943	602,000	638	Mansour Daou

All of the governorates except for Beirut and Akkar are divided into districts, which are further subdivided into municipalities.

The newest governorate is Keserwan-Jbeil, which was gazetted on 7 September 2017 but whose first governor, Pauline Deeb, was not appointed until 2020. Implementation of the next most recently created governorates, Akkar and Baalbek-Hermel, also remains ongoing since the appointment of their first governors in 2014.

== See also ==
- Politics of Lebanon
