= Antoine Ghandour =

Lebanese television writer (1942–2026)

Antoine Ghandour (5 April 1942 – 5 March 2026) was a Lebanese television writer.

== Life and career ==
Ghandour was born in Ain Alaq, Metn District on 5 April 1942. He worked in television, cinema, theater and radio. Ghandour was the first to write an hour-and-a-half-hour Lebanese television episode in the series "Kan Ayyam" and "Adeeb and a Story".

Throughout his career, he worked on a number of television series and theatrical, radio and film works, in addition to his documentary works that have been shown on Lebanese and Arab screens.

Ghandour died on 5 March 2026, at the age of 83.
