= 2026 Ramlet al-Baida airstrike =

2026 Israeli airstrike on displaced civilians in Beirut

- Part of 2026 Lebanon war, 2026 Iran war, Hezbollah–Israel conflict (2023–present)
- Location: Ramlet al-Baida, Beirut, Lebanon
- Date: March 12, 2026; ~02:00 EET (UTC+2)
- Attack type: Double tap airstrike
- Weapon: Drone
- Deaths: 8–12
- Injuries: 31–32
- Perpetrator: Israel Defense Forces

On March 12, 2026, the Israel Defense Forces (IDF) conducted a double-tap drone strike on the Ramlet al-Baida seafront in Beirut, Lebanon, killing at least eight people and wounding 31 others. The strike targeted an area where hundreds of displaced civilians sought refuge after they fled Israeli bombardment in Dahieh, Beirut's southern suburbs, and southern Lebanon. Israeli forces issued no warning to Lebanese civilians in the area before the strike.

== Background ==
On March 2, 2026, Hezbollah launched rocket fire toward Israel for the first time since the November 2024 ceasefire after the outbreak of the 2026 Iran–Israel war. Israel then started what its spokesperson called an "offensive" military campaign against the militant. Israeli forces launched intensive airstrikes across Lebanon and ordered mass civilian evacuations from southern Lebanon and Dahieh. By March 12, the escalation of the conflict had internally displaced 800,000 Lebanese citizens and at least 634 were killed.

Displaced Lebanese civilians had been gathered at the Ramlet al-Baida corniche in central Beirut. Hundreds of families erected tents on the seafront walkway and beach.

On the evening of March 11, Hezbollah launched its largest single barrage since the recent conflict escalation. The militant group fired approximately 100 rockets at northern Israel in a coordinated operation with Iran which launched long-range missiles to central Israel. Israel responded to this attack with what The Guardian said was "its most powerful bombardment of the southern suburbs yet."

== Strike ==
At around 02:00 in Lebanon on March 12, as displaced families slept in tents along the Ramlet al-Baida corniche, an Israeli drone struck an occupied vehicle on the seafront road. A second strike followed almost immediately in a double tap strike.

"There were two missiles. The first one killed three people by the beach, but when people approached to help them, they threw another one, creating chaos," said Ali Baloud, a displaced resident from Dahieh with five injured family members. Hussain Mansour, a 32 year old man, had fled from Majdal Salem in Southern Lebanon the previous week, and he had witnessed the double tap strike. He said his family was trapped in traffic, trying to flee, as the second strike hit.

Al Jazeera reporters said that the strike seemed like an attempted assassination "notably in areas outside those traditionally targeted, and beyond the zones where Israel has issued evacuation orders." L'Orient–Le Jour called the strike "massacre on the beach." At the scene of the strike, survivors saw bodies and body parts scattered on the seafront walkway.

The strike killed eight people and injured 31 others, according to Lebanon's Ministry of Public Health. The National, on the other hand, reported at least 12 dead and 28 others were injured at Ramlet al-Baida that morning.

Israel said it had targeted Hezbollah operatives and infrastructure but their spokesperson did not explain why the Israeli military struck an area densely populated with displaced civilians. Additionally, Israel Defense Forces did not give Lebanese civilians an advance warning for the strike.

== Reactions ==
Al Jazeera's Zeina Khodr described the attack as a "marked escalation in this conflict." Lebanese witnesses compared it to Israeli strikes in the Gaza Strip. "It was just like what we see in Gaza," said a displaced woman identified only as Dalal, who saw the strike with her family who were camping at the seafront.

Human rights groups said Israel's broader campaign of evacuation orders and strikes may amount to war crimes. They added that Israel was still obligated to prevent civilian harm regardless of evacuation orders.

== See also ==
- 2026 Iran war
- 2026 Lebanon war
