= Sand dam =

Best in semi-arid places, Simple, Provider of clean water for multiple uses

Sand dam project in Ethiopia

Sand dams are a simple, low-cost and low-maintenance, replicable rainwater harvesting technology. They provide a clean, local water supply for domestic and farming use and are suited to semi-arid areas of the world.

== Operation ==
A sand dam is a reinforced concrete wall (or a similarly robust and impermeable weir) built 1–5 metres high across a seasonal sand river.

When it rains the dam captures soil laden water behind it – the sand in the water sinks to the bottom, whilst the silt remains suspended in the water.

Research on Kenyan dams shows that only 1 to 3% of rainwater is retained behind any individual dam, the remainder continues its natural flow towards the ocean. Eventually the dams fill with sand - sometimes after only one rainfall or over 1–3 seasons. 25 to 40% of the volume of the sand held is actually water.

A mature sand dam can store millions of litres of water – refilling after each rainfall providing a year round supply of clean water to over 1,000 people.

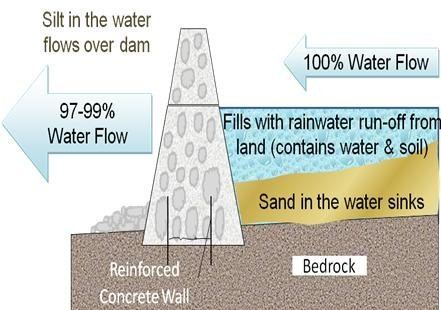

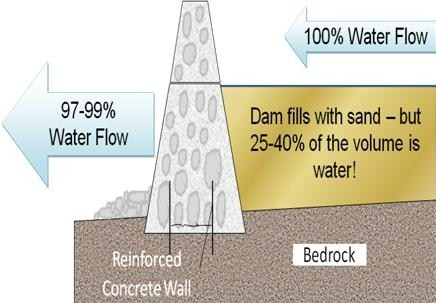

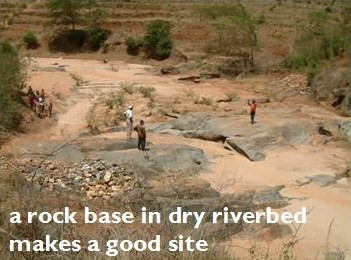

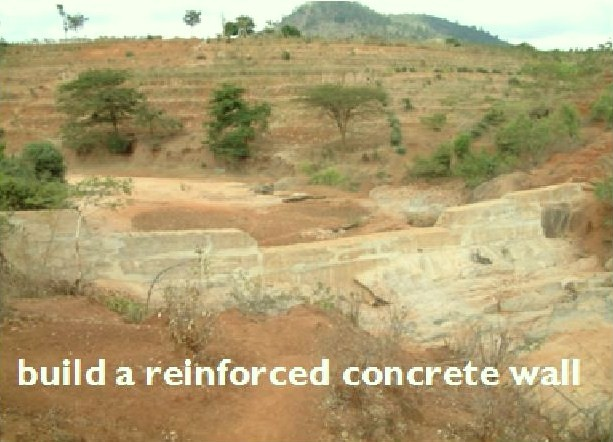

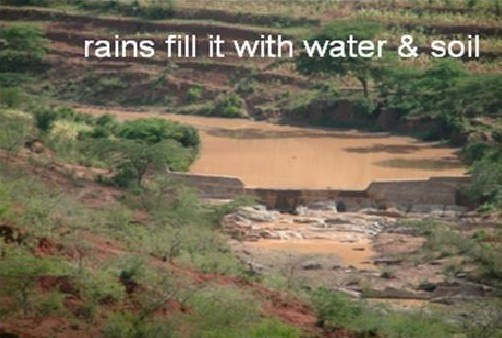

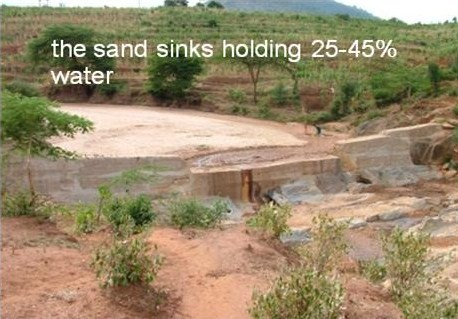

== Application ==
The highest concentration of sand dams with the strongest track record is found in Kenya although examples are found throughout world’s semi-arid regions from Angola to Zimbabwe. Further examples are recorded in Japan, India, Thailand, SW USA and Brazil.

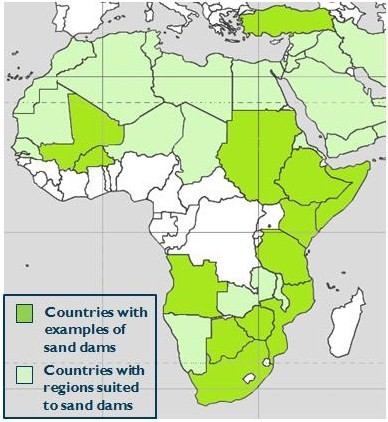

Sand dams can be built in the upper and middle courses of seasonal sandy river valleys (also known as wadis). Typically, sand dams are built in the transition zone between hills and plains where the gradient of the river bed is between 0.2-4%, but in extreme cases sand storage dams have been constructed on slopes of 10-16%. Dams must be built on bed rock or highly compacted sub-soil. For the obvious reason of economy on materials and labour, the stream must be reasonably narrow with well defined and stable river banks and the bedrock or impermeable subsoil within a few metres of the stream bed. Rocky banks and gorges are the most apt features. Further advice on the siting, design and construction of sand dams is available from the organisations and in the manuals listed below

== Extracting stored water ==
There are two simple ways:

1. Scooping a hole in the sand. The water will naturally emerge to the surface. Scope holes used for domestic water should be protected from contamination by livestock (by using acacia fencing or similar)
2. A slotted pipe buried in the sand that either passes through the dam wall or is connected to a simple hand pump situated on the river bank

== Benefits ==
1. Low cost and maintenance: Sand dams are the lowest cost form of rainwater harvesting known – 3 to 100 times lower cost than other technologies. A sand dam is built to last over 50 years, has no operational costs and requires little maintenance.
2. Community owned and managed: Most examples of sand dams are built by members of the communities they serve with support local and international development agencies. Community ownership and management is key to their successful operation.
3. They save time and enable increased food production and tree planting: During drought periods in semi-arid regions, people might have to walk up to 12 hours a day to fetch water, which is often unsafe to drink. Freed from the chore of walking sometimes the whole day to collect the water, farmers are able to improve food production and generate surplus income.
4. They provide a clean, secure and local year-round water supply in water scarce environments: The sand effectively acts as a large slow sand filter resulting high quality potable water. As the water is held under the sand, evaporation is minimal, people are protected from water-borne diseases and mosquitoes can’t breed – reducing the threat of malaria.
5. Wider benefits for health, education and communities: In areas where sand dams have been built, communities have observed a dramatic fall in water related disease, an increase in school attendance and a significant increase in household income and food production.
6. They transform the local ecology: The water held in the sand behind the dam spreads horizontally creating a permanent increase in the water table, allowing trees to grow naturally and transform the local ecology. The dams create a natural buffer that reduces the threat posed by flooding and drought and builds the resilience of communities to cope with the impacts of climate change in semi-arid regions.

== Case Study: A socio-economic effort at Community Development in Kitui, Kenya ==
On a global scale climate change and effects there of have exerted tremendous pressure on the biophysical, economic, political and social systems that govern the sustenance of a majority of African populations.

“Climate Change is expected to intensify existing problems and create new combinations of risks, particularly in Africa where there is widespread poverty and dependence on the natural environment.”

Kitui is a region in Eastern Kenya, East Africa, where the sand dam project has been relatively more successful in comparison to other regions that adopted the same or similar systems. The Kitui region has approximately five hundred functional sand dams that help with water storage for subsistence and commercial purposes for example irrigation, domestic use and for feeding and sustaining livestock. (Maurits, 2008)

Effectiveness of Sand Dams in Kitui

With the setup of over 500 dams in the region there is no question to how these sand dams are a major community requirement. The image below shows an overview of the multiple uses of sand dams in the Kitui region.

Image: Table showing Sand Dams use in Kitui

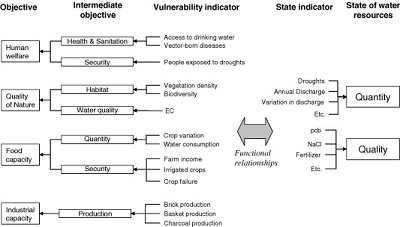
Image 2.0: Table showing Sand Dams use in Kitui

Human welfare:- these dams provide water security during the dry season when numerous rivers and wells dry up due to the harsh conditions of the region.

Quality of nature:- The dams provide water to the ecosystem by feeding the water table hence trees and flora are able to thrive in the surrounding areas.

Food capacity:- Due to access to water reserves numerous individuals engage in subsistence and semi-commercial farming which creates a source of income and livelihood for the Kitui People.

Industrial use:- On a larger scale these dams provide water for industrial capacity as individuals are able to engage on economic activities such as charcoal production, basket making and brick laying which creates a semi-stable source of income for the locals.

Hindrances to the sand dam project

There are numerous obstacles to the sand dam projects but the major ones that stand out are irregularity of the rainy seasons, slow funding, lack of communal platforms to run the projects and maintain them.

Conclusion

“The average income of farmers using sand dams rose with 9000 KSh. (USD 120), while less than 3% of total runoff is used. It is estimated that in 10 years time, more than 100,000 people have better access to water through low cost measure at an investment of about 35 USD per capita.” If these projects had more government, Non-governmental participation and an increased community involvement, Kitui could be a world renown model for the ability of rural communities to combat drought, famine and other effects of climate change.

== Sand dam building organizations ==
- Utooni Development Organization (UDO was formerly named Excellent Development, Kenya)
- Sand Dams Worldwide (formerly Excellent Development) UK
- Sahelian Solution Foundation (SASOL)in Kenya
- Africa Sand Dam Foundation (ASDF) in Kenya
- Acacia Institute and RAIN Foundation
- WaterAid working through Action Micro Barrage (Burkino Faso)
- Church World Service (Kenya)
- Dabane Trust (Zimbabwe)
- Mennonite Central Committee supporting sand dams in Kenya, Tanzania, Mozambique
- SOS Sahel supporting sand dams in Sudan and Kenya
- VSF Belgium (Kenya)
- World Vision (Kenya)

Polish Humanitarian Action building dams in Kenya and Madagascar

== Bibliography ==
- Sand dams: low-tech weapons against climate change, The New Scientist, 2006
- Ertsen, M.; Hut, R. (2009). "Two waterfalls do not hear each other. Sand-storage dams, science and sustainable development in Kenya" (PDF). Physics and Chemistry of the Earth, Parts A/B/C. 34 (1–2): 14–22. doi:10.1016/j.pce.2008.03.009. Archived from the original (PDF) on 27 July 2011.
- Hut, R.; Ertsen, M.; Joeman, N.; Vergeer, N.; Winsemius, H.; Giesen, N.V. (2008). "Effects of sand storage dams on groundwater levels with examples from Kenya". Physics and Chemistry of the Earth, Parts A/B/C. 33 (1–2): 56–66. doi:10.1016/j.pce.2007.04.006.
- Lasage, R.; Aerts, J.; Mutiso, G.; Vries, A.D. (2008). "Potential for community based adaptation to droughts: Sand dams in Kitui, Kenya". Physics and Chemistry of the Earth, Parts A/B/C. 33 (1–2): 67–73. doi:10.1016/j.pce.2007.04.009.
- Maddrell, Simon R. (2018). Sand Dams: A Practical & Technical Manual. Excellent Development. ISBN 978-1-9997263-0-0.
- Quilis, R.O.; Hoogmoed, M.; Ertsen, M.; Foppen, J.W.; Hut, R.; Vries, A.D. (2009). "Measuring and modeling hydrological processes of sand-storage dams on different spatial scales" (PDF). Physics and Chemistry of the Earth, Parts A/B/C. 34 (4–5): 289–298. doi:10.1016/j.pce.2008.06.057. Archived from the original (PDF) on 27 July 2011.
- Villavicencio, G.; Espinace, R.; Palma, J.; Fourie, A.; Valenzuela, P. (2014). "Failures of sand tailings dams in a highly seismic country". Can. Geotech. J. 51 (4): 449–464. doi:10.1139/cgj-2013-0142.
- Ziervogel, G.; Zermoglio, F. (2009). "Climate change scenarios and the development of adaptation strategies in Africa: Challenges and opportunities". Clim. Res. 40: 133–146. doi:10.3354/cr00804.
