= Marwan Abboud =

Lebanese politician; governor of Beirut

- Born: 25 August 1969
- Occupations: Politician, judge

Marwan Abboud (Arabic: مروان عبود; born 25 August 1969) is a Lebanese politician and judge, who was appointed governor of Beirut in June 2020.

He was previously President of the Supreme Disciplinary Authority, appointed to the role on 14 November 2012. He had the responsibility for reviewing allegations of corruption among civil servants.
