= Al-Qlayaa =

Al-Qlayaa القليعة
- Municipality
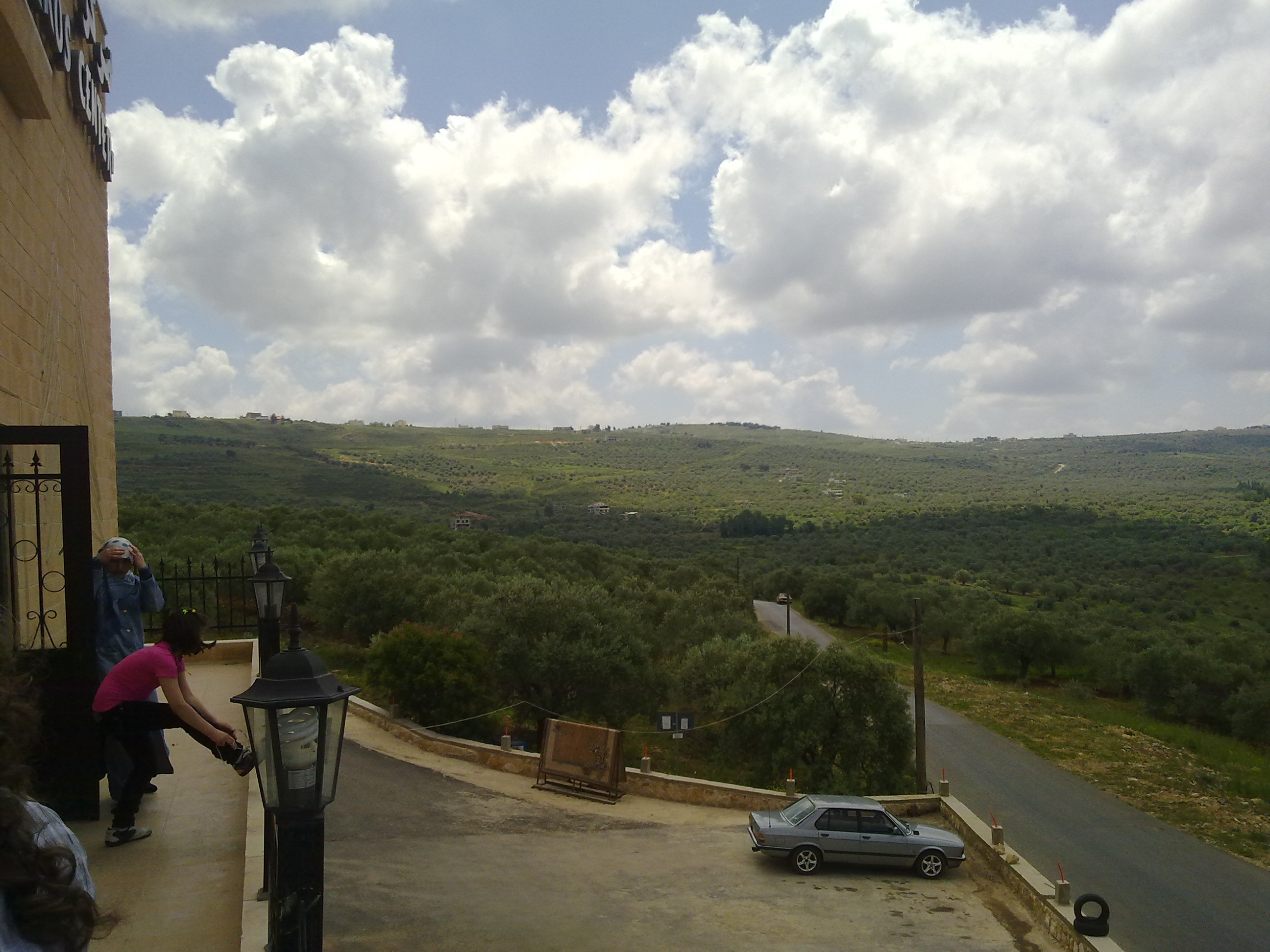
- Al-Qlayaa

- Location within Lebanon
- Coordinates: 33°19′45″N 35°33′57″E
- Grid position: 133/155 L
- Country: Lebanon
- Governorate: Nabatieh Governorate
- District: Marjayoun District
- Elevation: 660 m (2,170 ft)

Population (2026)
  - Total: 4,000
- Time zone: UTC+2 (EET)
  - Summer (DST): UTC+3 (EEST)
- Dialing code: +961

Al-Qlayaa (Arabic: القليعة, romanized: al-Qlayʿah) is a municipality in the Marjayoun District in southern Lebanon. The inhabitants are mainly Maronite Christians.

== Etymology ==
According to E. H. Palmer, the name means "the little castle".

== Geography ==
The village sits on a ridge at an elevation estimated between 650 and 700 meters (2,130–2,300 ft) above sea level.[4][5][6] Its position places it within the hilly landscape of the Upper Galilee region, an area characterized by rolling highlands and valleys typical of southern Lebanese terrain. Al-Qlaiaah lies around 4.5 kilometers southwest of the town of Marjayoun and approximately four kilometers from the Israeli border. Its elevated position offers broad views over the Litani River valley to the west.

== History ==
In 1838, Eli Smith noted Al-Qlayaa's population as Maronite.

In 1870 Victor Guérin found the village to have 400 Maronite inhabitants.

In 1881, the PEF's Survey of Western Palestine (SWP) described it: "A village, built of stone, containing about 150 Christians; it contains a church, and is situated on a ridge, with vineyards, olives, figs, and arable land around; it has a birket and spring near." Note that a birket is a pool of water.

On 9 March 2026, an Israeli tank fired on a house in the village twice, killing the parish priest, Pierre al-Rahi.

== Demographics ==
In 2014 Christians made up 98.81% of registered voters in Al-Qlayaa. 92.40% of the voters were Maronite Catholics. The population in 2026 was about 4,000.

== See also ==
- Catholic Church in Lebanon

== Bibliography ==
- Conder, C.R.; Kitchener, H.H. (1881). The Survey of Western Palestine: Memoirs of the Topography, Orography, Hydrography, and Archaeology. Vol. 1. London: Committee of the Palestine Exploration Fund.
- Guérin, V. (1880). Description Géographique Historique et Archéologique de la Palestine (in French). Vol. 3: Galilee, pt. 2. Paris: L'Imprimerie Nationale.
- Palmer, E.H. (1881). The Survey of Western Palestine: Arabic and English Name Lists Collected During the Survey by Lieutenants Conder and Kitchener, R. E. Transliterated and Explained by E.H. Palmer. Committee of the Palestine Exploration Fund.
- Robinson, E.; Smith, E. (1841). Biblical Researches in Palestine, Mount Sinai and Arabia Petraea: A Journal of Travels in the year 1838. Vol. 3. Boston: Crocker & Brewster.
