= Abibaʻl inscription =

Phoenician inscription from Byblos

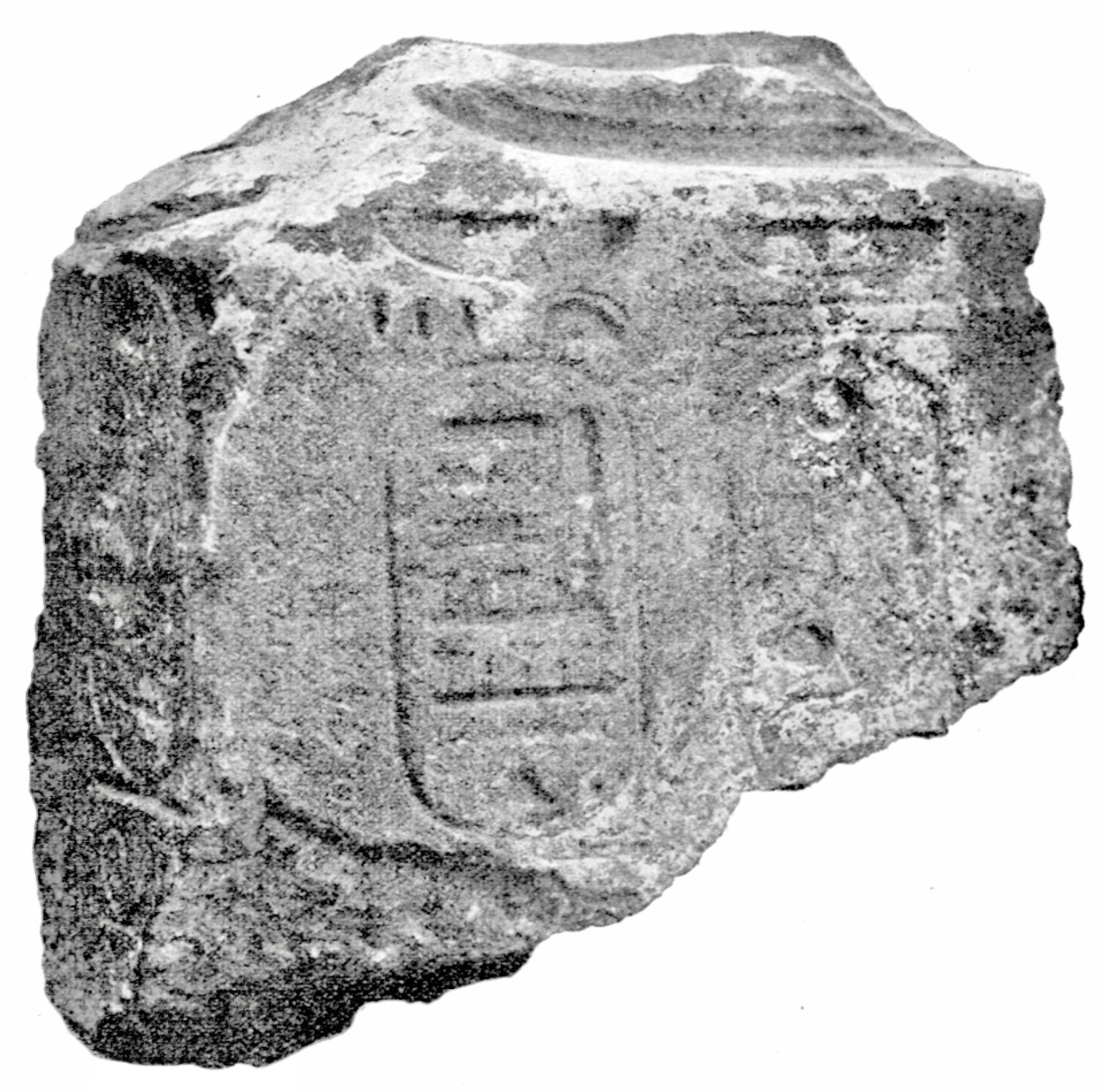
- The Abibaʻl Inscription in Phoenician letters. The Egyptian hieroglyphs are the cartouches of Sheshonq I
- Created: c. 935 BC
- Discovered: 1895; Byblos, Keserwan-Jbeil, Lebanon
- Present location: Berlin, Germany

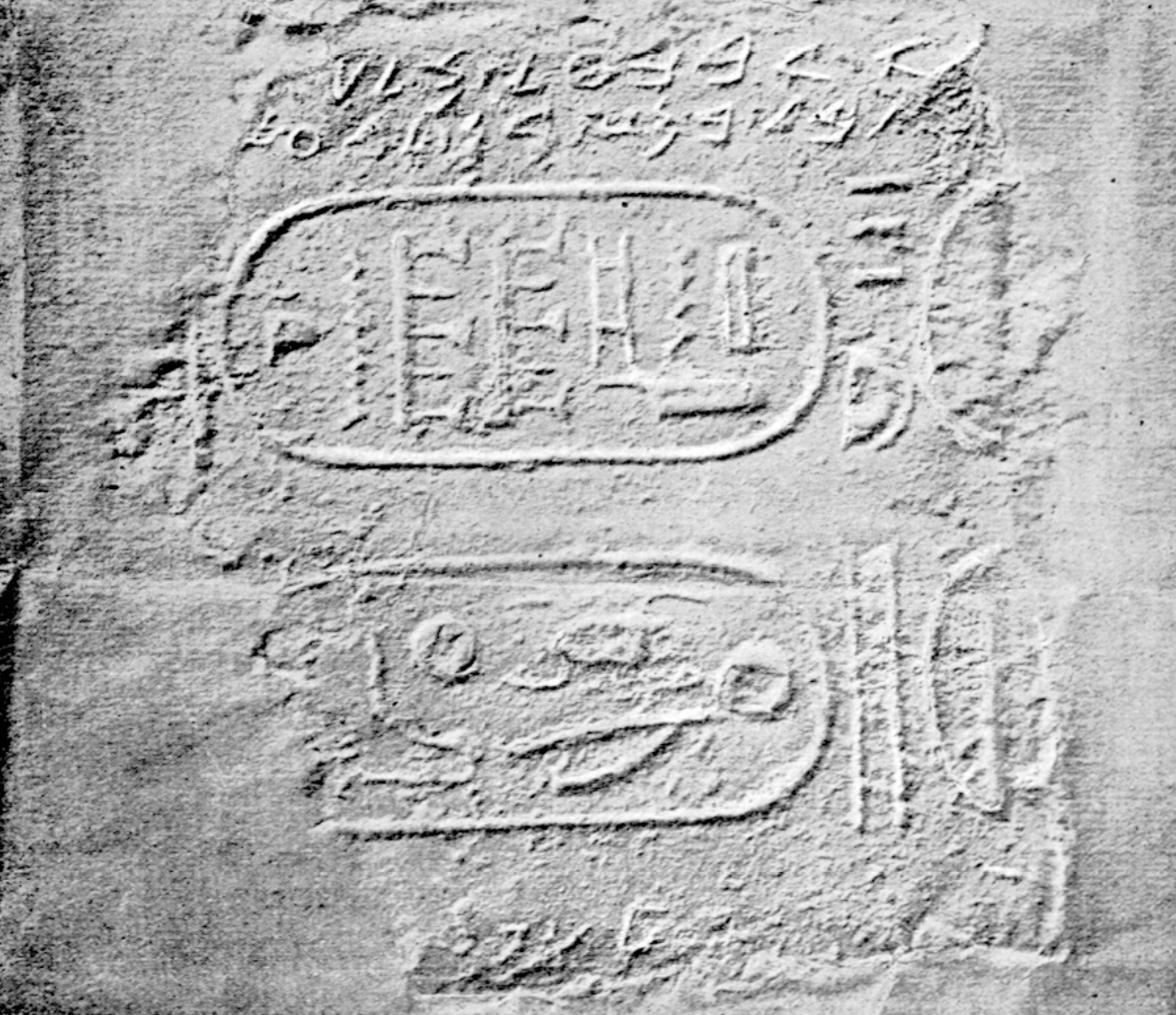
Abibaʻl inscription archaeological (copy)

The Abibaʻl Inscription is a Phoenician inscription from Byblos on the base of a throne on which a statue of Sheshonq I was placed. It is held at the Vorderasiatisches Museum Berlin.

It was found in 1895, published in 1903.

It was acquired by Charles Clermont-Ganneau via the Danish diplomat Julius Loytved.

Currently in the archives of the Vorderasiatisches Museum Berlin, VA 3361.

It is known as KAI 5, and is one of thirteen significant inscriptions discovered in Byblos.

== Text of the inscription ==
The inscription reads:

(1)	[MŠ(?) Z Y]Bʼ ʼBBʻL MLK [GBL BYḤMLK (?)	[This is the statue (?) that he br]ought, Abibaʻal, King [of Byblos, son of Yehimelk (?)]
(2a)	MLK] GBL BMṢRM LBʻL[T GBL ʼDTW	[King of] Byblos, from Egypt, for Baʻal[at Gebal, his Lady].
(2b)	TʼRK BʻLT GBL YMT ʼBBʻL WŠNTW] ‘L GBL	[May she prolong, Baʻalat Gebal, the days of Abibaal and his years] over Byblos.

== Bibliography ==
- Montet, Pierre. “COMMENT RÉTABLIR L’INSCRIPTION D’ABIBAAL, ROI DE BYBLOS?” Revue Biblique (1892-1940) 35, no. 3 (1926): 321–27
- Lemaire André. La datation des rois de Byblos Abibaal et Élibaal et les relations entre l’Égypte et le Levant au Xe siècle av. notre ère. In: Comptes rendus des séances de l'Académie des Inscriptions et Belles-Lettres, 150^{e} année, N. 4, 2006. pp. 1697–1716. DOI : https://doi.org/10.3406/crai.2006.88119
