= Mousaitbeh =

Quarter in Beirut, Lebanon

Mousaitbeh المصيطبة
- Location within Beirut
- Coordinates: 33.8836°N 35.4955°E
- Country: Lebanon

al-Mousaitbeh (Arabic: المصيطبة, romanized: al-Mūsayṭbah) is a quarter in Beirut, the Lebanese capital. It is a mixed area of Sunni Muslims and Greek Orthodox Christians.

== Demographics ==
Religion in Mousaitbeh (2014)
Religion	Percent
Sunni Islam	58.22%
Shia Islam	16.02%
Christian	22.20%
Others	3.56%

In 2014, Muslims made up 74.29% and Christians made up 22.20% of registered voters in Mousaitbeh. 58.22% of the voters were Sunni Muslims, 16.02% were Shiite Muslims, 7.78% were Greek Orthodox and 5.45% were Syriac Orthodox.
