= Dar el-Mraisseh =

Neighborhood in Beirut, Lebanon

Dar el-Mraisseh دار المريسة
- Location within Beirut
- Coordinates: 33°54′03″N 35°28′52″E
- Country: Lebanon

Dar el-Mraisseh (Arabic: دار المريسة, romanized: Dār al-Mrayssah) is a neighborhood in Beirut, the capital of Lebanon.

== Demographics ==
Religion in Dar el-Mraisseh (2014)
| Religion | Percent |
| Sunni Islam | 53.09% |
| Christian | 18.83% |
| Shia Islam | 16.04% |
| Druze | 10.82% |
| Others | 1.22% |

In 2014, Muslims made up 69.17% and Christians made up 18.83% of registered voters in Dar el-Mraisseh. 53.09% of the voters were Sunni Muslims, 16.04% were Shiite Muslims and 10.82% were Druze.
