= Medawar, Beirut =

Neighborhood in Beirut, Lebanon

Medawar المدور
- Location within Beirut
- Coordinates: 33°54′03″N 35°31′54″E
- Country: Lebanon

Medawar (Arabic: المدور, romanized: al-Midawar) is a neighborhood in Beirut, the capital of Lebanon.

== Demographics ==
Religion in Medawar (2014)
Religion	Percent
Christian	84.26%
Sunni Islam	13.21%
Shia Islam	1.84%
Others	0.69%

In 2014, Christians made up 84.26% and Muslims made up 15.10% of registered voters in Medawar. 57.06% of the voters were Armenian Orthodox, 13.21% were Sunni Muslims, 6.76 were Armenian Catholics and 6.13% were Maronite Catholics.
