= Bachoura, Beirut =

Neighborhood in Beirut, Lebanon

Bachoura الباشورة
- Location within Beirut
- Coordinates: 33.8909°N 35.5032°E
- Country: Lebanon

Al Bachoura (Arabic: الباشورة, romanized: al-Bashūrah) is a neighbourhood in Beirut, the capital of Lebanon.

== Etymology ==
The name 'Bachoura' possibly originates from a military term used by the Mamluk state, meaning sand dams. The area was formerly known as "Torbat Omar".

== Demographics ==
Religion in Bachoura (2014)
Religion	Percent
Shia Islam	47.72%
Sunni Islam	40.09%
Christian	11.47%
Others	0.72%

In 2014, Muslims made up 87.84% and Christians made up 11.47% of registered voters in Bachoura. 47.72% of the voters were Shiite Muslims and 40.09% were Sunni Muslims.

== Gallery ==
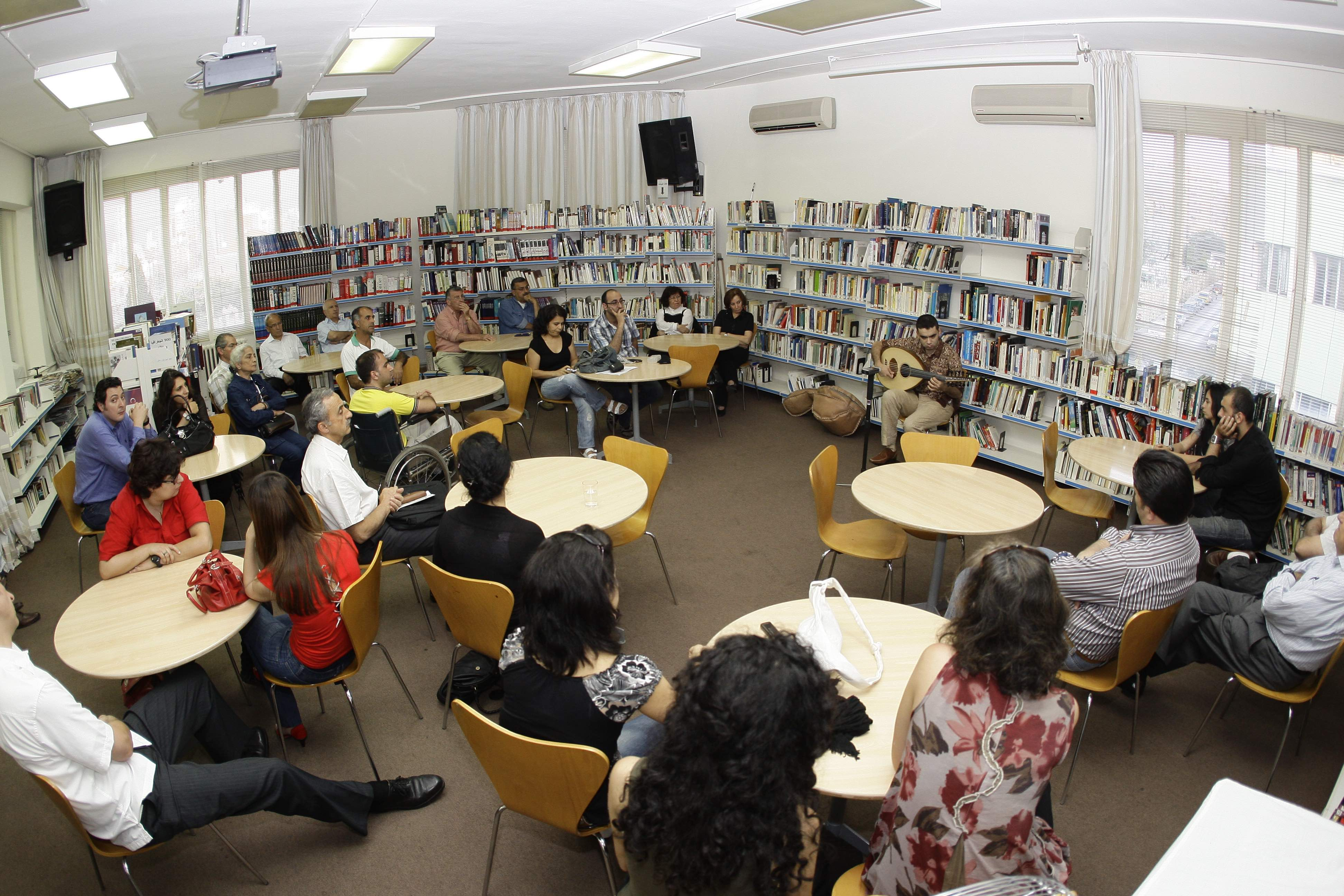
A meeting inside the Beirut Municipal Library in al-Bashoura

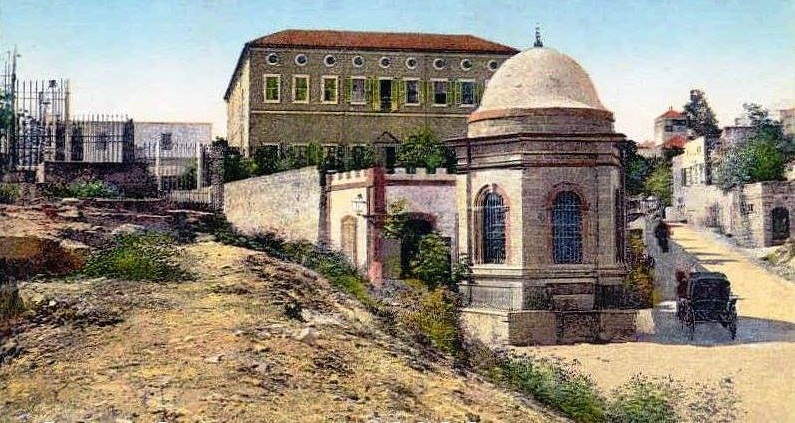
Al-Bashoura cemetery
