= Mazraa, Beirut =

Neighborhood in Beirut, Lebanon

Mazraa المزرعة
- Location within Beirut
- Coordinates: 33.8797°N 35.5022°E
- Country: Lebanon

Al Mazraa (Arabic: المزرعة, romanized: al-Mazrʿah) is a neighborhood in Beirut, the capital of Lebanon. It is predominantly Sunni with some Sunni-Shia mixed areas.

== Demographics ==
Religion in Mazraa (2014)
Religion	Percent
Sunni Islam	84.28%
Shia Islam	7.25%
Christian	7.75%
Others	0.72%

In 2014, Muslims made up 91.54% and Christians made up 7.75% of registered voters in Mazraa. 84.28% of the voters were Sunni Muslims.
