= Yahya Skaf =

Lebanese terrorist

Member of Fatah
- In office ?–?

Personal details
- Born: Bhanine (Menyeh), Lebanon
- Party: Fatah, Syrian Social Nationalist Party

Yahya Skaf, also spelled Yehia Skaff (Arabic: يحيى سكاف), from the Bhanine (Menyeh) district of Lebanon, is a person claimed to have been arrested by Israel on 11 March 1978 for participation in the Coastal Road massacre. Israel claims he was killed during battle with his body never found. It is claimed by the Khiam Center that his family and some released detainees have borne witness to his imprisonment.

A supporter of the Syrian Social Nationalist Party, he subsequently joined Fatah to participate in military operations against Israel.

Hezbollah leader Hassan Nasrallah suggested Skaf be a part of a prisoner exchange during the 2006 Lebanon War. However, he was not included in the July 2008 prisoner exchange.
