= Casualties of the 2006 Lebanon War =

There were many casualties in the 2006 Lebanon War, leading to condemnation of both sides, however the exact distribution of casualties has been disputed. The Lebanese Higher Relief Council (HRC), UNICEF, and various press agencies and news organizations have stated that most of those killed were Lebanese civilians, however the Lebanese government does not differentiate between civilians and combatants in death toll figures. The Israeli government identified 43 Israeli civilians killed by Hezbollah rocket attacks, including four who died of heart attacks during rocket attacks. The Israel Defense Forces (IDF) death toll ranges from 118 to 121, depending on the source and whether or not casualties that occurred after the ceasefire are included. The figures for the Hezbollah fighters killed are the most varying, with Hezbollah claiming 250 of its fighters killed, while Israel claimed to have identified 530 dead Hezbollah fighters. The IDF estimates 600–700 dead Hezbollah fighters. Sources can be conflicting.

== Overall ==
=== Casualties of involved parties ===
Entity	Civilian	Military
Amal Movement		20 dead
Hezbollah		Deaths: ≈250 fighters KIA reported by Hezbollah, ≤500 estimated by Lebanese Government, Military, and Intelligence officials, ≈500 estimated by UN ≈600 estimated by IDF, 450 bodies identified by Israel and up to 700 estimated by Amidror
Israel	*45 dead 35 seriously wounded 70 moderately wounded 1,390 lightly wounded 2,775 treated for shock and anxiety	IDF casualties: 120 soldiers were killed in the war, including the two soldiers whose bodies were seized in the Zar'it-Shtula incident that started the war, whose fates weren't confirmed until their bodies were exchanged for Lebanese prisoners in 2008.; 1,244 soldiers wounded
Lebanon	Not known for certain. 1,200 Lebanese dead in total (including combatants and foreign civilians in Lebanon); 4,410 injured	50 dead ~100 wounded
LCP		15 dead
PFLP-GC		2 dead
United Nations	1 dead	5 dead 125 wounded. See main article
Total	1,233+ dead, including militants 5,089+ wounded	438-888+ dead 512+ wounded

=== Foreign civilian casualties in Israel ===
- Argentina – 1 dead
- United States – 1 dead
- Total: 2 dead

=== Foreign civilian casualties in Lebanon ===
- Brazil – 6 dead
- Canada – 8 dead; 6 wounded
- Germany – 4 dead
- India – 1 dead
- Indonesia – 1 dead
- Iraq – 1 dead
- Jordan – 1 dead
- Kuwait – 2 dead
- Nigeria – 1 dead
- Philippines – 2 dead; 6 wounded
- Sri Lanka – 1 dead
- Syria – 17 dead
- Ukraine – 1 dead
- Total: 51 dead; 25 wounded

== Lebanese ==
- According to various media, between 1,000 and 1,200 people are reported dead. Additionally, there were between 480 and 1,100 people wounded, and over 1,000,000 were temporarily made refugees, with an unknown number of missing civilians in the south.
- On 28 July, Lebanese Health Minister Mohammad Khalifeh announced that hospitals in Lebanon had received 401 dead Lebanese people since 12 July. He also reportedly said: "On top of those victims, there are 150 to 200 bodies still under the rubble. We have not been able to pull them out because the areas they died in are still under fire".
- As of 5 August, The American University of Beirut Medical Center, the largest and most important hospital in Lebanon, had only enough power to continue operations for a week.
- According to the Lebanese government's "Council for Development and Reconstruction" the Lebanese damage incurred amounted to US $3.5 billion: US $2 billion for buildings and US $1.5 billion for infrastructure.

=== Hezbollah ===
- The Kuwait Times reported that Hezbollah has buried over 700 fighters with more to follow, August 30.
- The Australian reports that Israel has the names of over 430 Hezbollah fighters it killed and estimates total Hezbollah dead at over 800, August 29. (Abraham Rabinovich recently reported in The Washington Times on Sept. 27 that Israel now had 532 names.)

A report on August 4, documenting Iran's financial help to the families of Hezbollah fighters, claimed Hezbollah had already lost 500 men, plus 1,500 wounded. The report said that the wounded were being treated in Syria to make the wounded harder to count.

== Israeli ==
- A total of 121 IDF soldiers were killed in the war, including the two soldiers whose bodies were seized in the Zar'it-Shtula incident that started the war, whose fates weren't confirmed until their bodies were exchanged for Lebanese prisoners in 2008.
- According to Israel Ministry of Foreign Affairs, 43 civilians have been killed, out of which 18 were Israeli Arabs, while another 418 civilians were treated in hospitals, 19 of whom were seriously injured, and another 875 treated for shock.
- $1.6 billion cost to the Israeli economy
- The war cost Israel $5.3 billion
- Northern Israeli businesses lost $1.4 billion
- Estimated compensation to be given to the population of northern Israel is $335.4 million
- Israel plans to given $460 million to local governments and emergency services in northern Israel
- 630 factories in Israel were closed
- Israel lost 1.5 percent in GDP
- 300,000 Israelis were displaced
- Over 1 million Israelis lived in bomb shelters
- 6,000 homes were hit by rockets
- Israel's forests are expected to recover in 50–60 years
- 6,178 of grazing land in Israel was burned
- 618 acres (2.50 km^{2}) of natural or planted forests were burned

Israeli military and civilian Casualties in the 2006 Lebanese war
	Soldiers			Civilians		Rockets fired
	Killed	Wounded	Captured	Killed	Wounded	on Israel
12 July	8	4	2		2	22
13 July		2		2	67	125
14 July	4	2		2	19	103
15 July		4			16	100
16 July		17		8	77	47
17 July					28	92
18 July		1		1	21	136
19 July	2	15		2	18	116
20 July	5	8			16	34
21 July	1	3			52	97
22 July		7			35	129
23 July				2	45	94
24 July	4	27			17	111
25 July		10		2	60	101
26 July	8	31		1	32	169
27 July		6			38	109
28 July		10			19	111
29 July		7			10	86
30 July		8			81	156
31 July		12			25	6
1 August	3	12				4
2 August	1	41		1	88	230
3 August	4	22		8	76	213
4 August	3	25		3	97	194
5 August	2	70		4	59	170
6 August	12	35		4	150	189
7 August	3	35			12	185
8 August	6	74			10	136
9 August	15	186			36	166
10 August	2	123		2	21	155
11 August	1	76			26	123
12 August	24	131			24	64
13 August	9	203		1	105	217
14 August		37			2	
15 August	2					
Total	119	1244	2	43	1384	3990

== United Nations ==
UN personnel were subjected to dozens of attacks and near misses from both sides during the present conflict, most prominently the 25 July Israeli bombing of a UNTSO position, which killed four UNTSO unarmed observers (Austrian, Canadian, Chinese and Finnish). Diplomats familiar with the probe say that the strike was carried out with a precision-guided missile.

Secretary-General Kofi Annan said in a statement from Rome that he was "shocked and deeply distressed by the apparently deliberate targeting by Israeli Defence Forces." On 26 July 2006, Israeli Prime Minister Ehud Olmert phoned Kofi Annan and expressed his deep regret over the death of the four UN observers. He promised that Israel would thoroughly investigate the incident and would share the findings with Annan, but says he was taken aback by secretary general's statement saying that the Israeli attack on the UN post was "apparently deliberate".

After the attack, Dan Gillerman, Israel's UN representative, said Israel would not allow the UN itself to participate in an investigation of the airstrike that killed the four UN observers.

Just before the end of bombing, on 14 August, the IDF targeted what it said was a Palestinian faction in the Ein el-Hilweh refugee camp in Saida. Two missiles were fired into a civilian residential area and killed UNRWA/UN staff member Abdel Saghir. Few days before two civilians were killed.

== See also ==
- Arab–Israeli conflict
- United Nations Interim Force in Lebanon – UNIFIL (1978–present)
- 2006 Qana airstrike
- Allegations of war crimes in the 2006 Lebanon War
