= 2006 Lebanon War =

Armed conflict primarily between Israel and Hezbollah

- Part of the Israeli–Lebanese conflict, Hezbollah–Israel conflict, the Iran–Israel proxy conflict and the war on terror
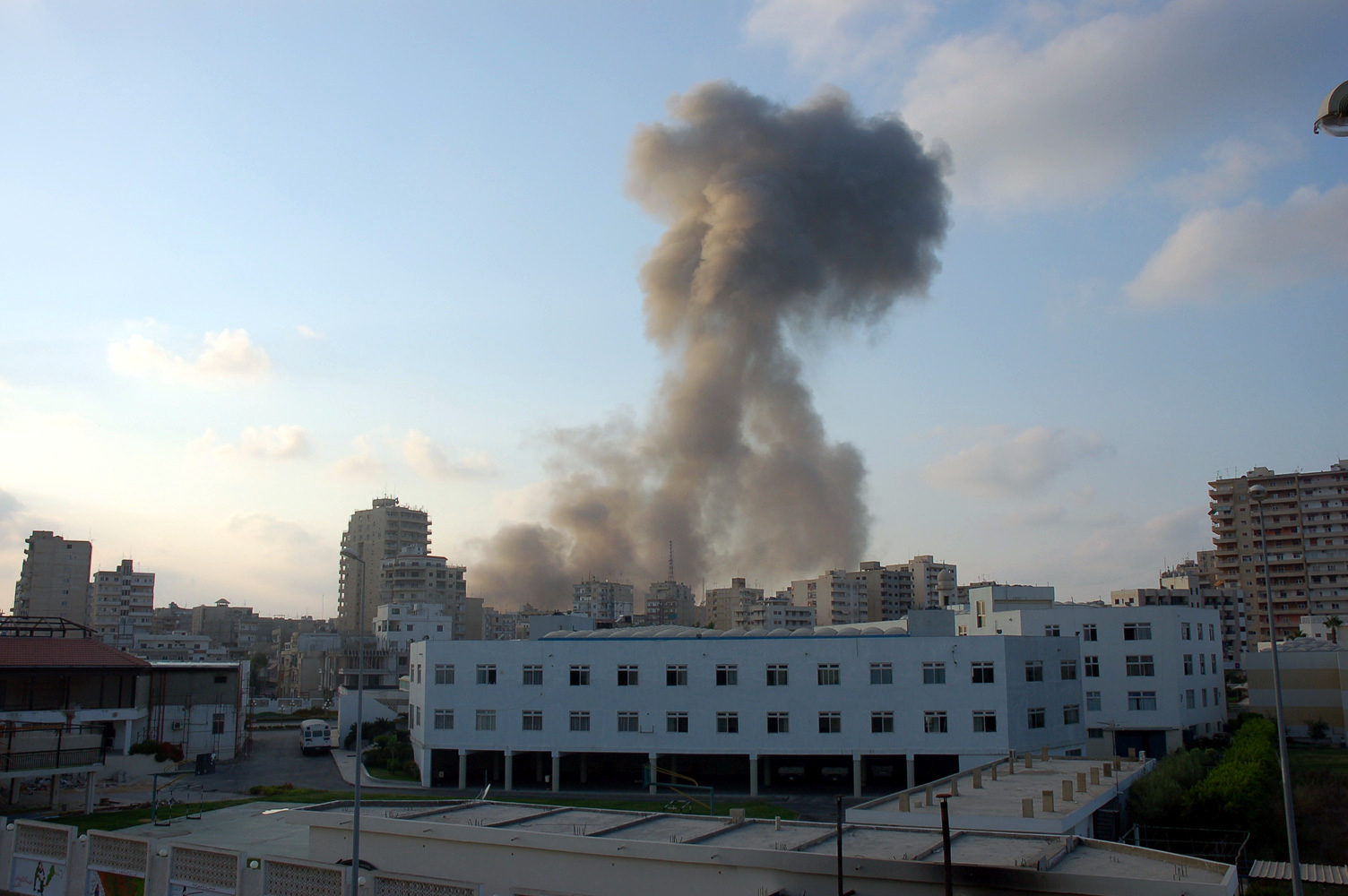
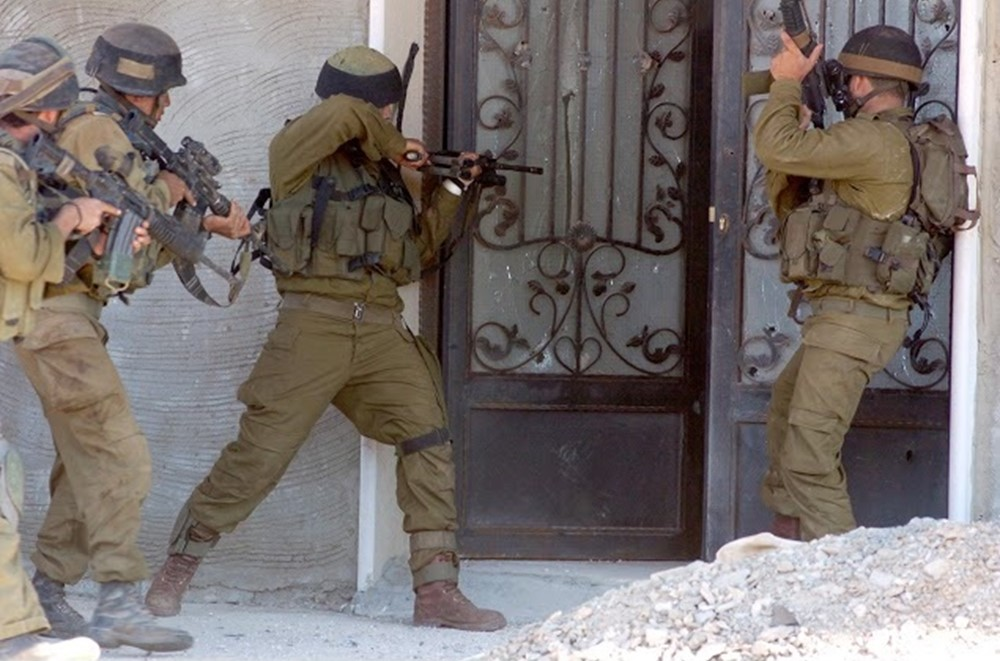
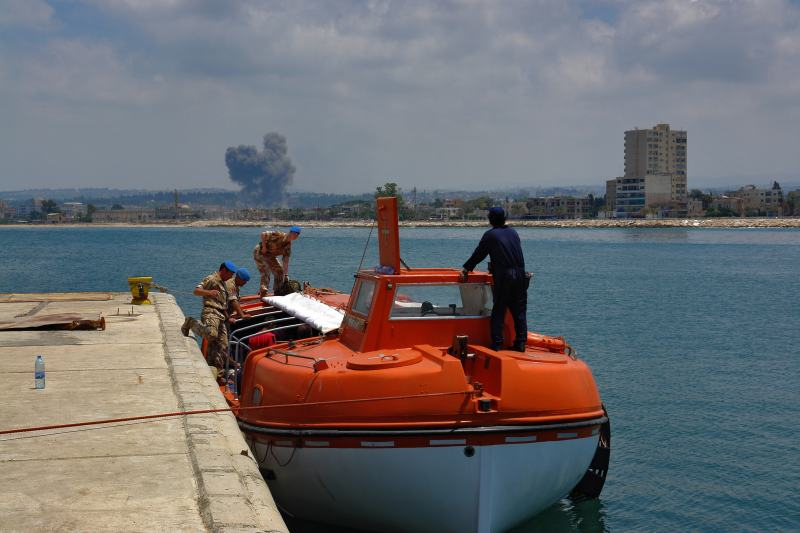
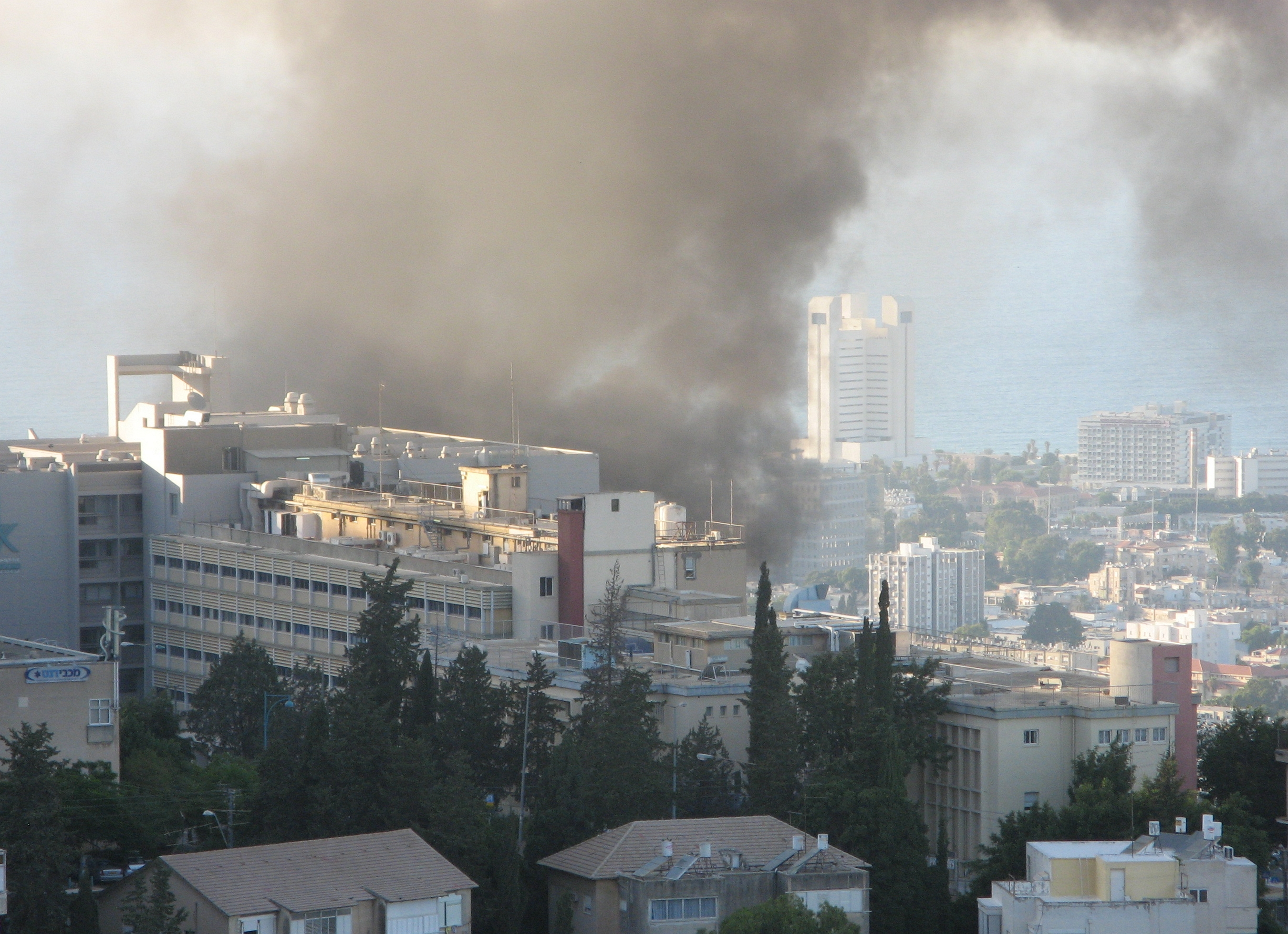
- Clockwise from top left: Mushroom cloud from an IAF airstrike on Tyre; IDF soldiers during the Battle of Maroun al-Ras.; Smoke from a Hezbollah rocket strike near Bnai Zion Medical Center in Haifa.; UNIFIL soldiers evacuating refugees from Tyre.
Date	12 July – 14 August 2006 (Note: Israeli blockade of Lebanon ended on 8 September 2006) (1 month and 2 days)
Location	Lebanon, northern Israel and the Golan Heights
Result	Inconclusive (see analysis)
Territorial changes	Israel occupies northern Ghajar until present

Belligerents
Israel	Hezbollah; Amal Movement; Lebanese Communist Party; Popular Front for the Liberation of Palestine – General Command; Syrian Social Nationalist Party in Lebanon

Commanders and leaders
(Israel) Ehud Olmert (Israel) Amir Peretz (Israel) Dan Halutz (Israel) Moshe Kaplinsky (Israel) Udi Adam (Israel) Eliezer Shkedi (Israel) David Ben-Besht	(Hezbollah) Hassan Nasrallah (Hezbollah) Imad Mughniyeh; Nabih Berri; Khaled Hadadi; Ahmed Jibril; Ali Qanso

Strength
Up to 10,000 soldiers by 2 August; 30,000 soldiers in the last few days	Up to 1,000 (south of the Litani River)

Casualties and losses
Israel: 121 Israel Defense Forces personnel killed; 1,244 Israel Defense Forces personnel wounded; 20 tanks destroyed; 1 helicopter shot down, 3 lost in accidents; 1 corvette damaged; 44 Israeli civilians killed; 1,384 Israeli civilians wounded; 2 foreign civilians killed	In Lebanon: Lebanese citizens* and foreign citizens (Note: The Lebanese government did not differentiate between civilians and combatants in death toll figures. For total casualty figures, see: Casualties of the 2006 Lebanon War); Dead: 1,191 (per Amnesty International and Lebanese government) 1,109 (per Human Rights Watch); Wounded: 4,409; Hezbollah fighters: 250 killed (per Human Rights Watch and Hezbollah) 600+ killed and 800 wounded (per Israel) Captured: 4 fighters; Amal militia: 17 dead; LCP militia: 12 dead; PFLP-GC militia: 2 dead; Lebanese Armed Forces and Internal Security Forces: 43 dead; Foreign civilians: 51 dead 25 wounded; United Nations: 5 dead 12 wounded
- Lebanon tried to remain neutral but still suffered casualties from Israeli artillery and airstrikes during the conflict.

The 2006 Lebanon War was a 34-day armed conflict in Lebanon, fought between Hezbollah and Israel. The war started on 12 July 2006 and continued until a United Nations-brokered ceasefire went into effect in the morning on 14 August 2006, though it formally ended on 8 September 2006 when Israel lifted its naval blockade of Lebanon. It marked the third Israeli invasion into Lebanon since 1978.

After Israel's withdrawal from southern Lebanon in 2000, Hezbollah aimed for the release of Lebanese citizens held in Israeli prisons. On 12 July 2006, Hezbollah ambushed Israeli soldiers on the border, killing three and capturing two; a further five were killed during a failed Israeli rescue attempt. Hezbollah demanded an exchange of prisoners with Israel. Israel launched airstrikes and artillery fire on targets in Lebanon, attacking both Hezbollah military targets and Lebanese civilian infrastructure, including Beirut's Rafic Hariri International Airport. Israel launched a ground invasion of Southern Lebanon and imposed an air-and-naval blockade on the country. Hezbollah then launched more rockets into northern Israel and engaged the IDF in guerrilla warfare from hardened positions. According to Israeli sources, Hezbollah fired close to 4,000 rockets and missiles at Israel from their arsenal of around 15,000 held before the war.

On 11 August 2006, the United Nations Security Council unanimously approved United Nations Security Council Resolution 1701 (UNSCR 1701) in an effort to end the hostilities, which called for disarmament of Hezbollah, Israeli withdrawal from Lebanon, and for the deployment of the Lebanese Armed Forces and an enlarged United Nations Interim Force in Lebanon (UNIFIL) in the south. The Lebanese Army began deploying in Southern Lebanon on 17 August and the blockade was lifted on 8 September. On 1 October, most Israeli troops withdrew from Lebanon, although the last of the troops continued to occupy the border-straddling village of Ghajar.

Both Hezbollah and the Israeli government claimed victory, while the Winograd Commission deemed the war a missed opportunity for Israel as it did not lead to disarmament of Hezbollah. The conflict is believed to have killed between 1,191 and 1,300 Lebanese people, and 165 Israelis. It severely damaged Lebanese civil infrastructure, and displaced approximately one million Lebanese and 300,000–500,000 Israelis. The remains of the two captured soldiers, whose fates were unknown, were returned to Israel on 16 July 2008 as part of a prisoner exchange.

== Other names ==
The war is known in Lebanon as the July War (Arabic: حرب تموز, Ḥarb Tammūz) and in Israel as the Second Lebanon War (Note: After the 1982 Lebanon War regarded as the First Lebanon War and before the 2024 Israeli invasion of Lebanon regarded as the Third Lebanon War by some Israeli sources.) (Hebrew: מלחמת לבנון השנייה, Milhemet Levanon HaShniya). The war is also known as the Israel–Hezbollah War of 2006.

== Background ==
Cross-border attacks from southern Lebanon into Israel by the Palestine Liberation Organization (PLO) dated as far back as 1968, following the 1967 Six-Day War; the area became a significant base for attacks following the arrival of the PLO leadership and its Fatah brigade following their 1971 expulsion from Jordan. Starting about this time, increasing demographic tensions related to the Lebanese National Pact, which had divided governmental powers among religious groups throughout the country 30 years previously, began running high and led in part to the Lebanese Civil War (1975–1990).

During the 1978 Israeli invasion of southern Lebanon, Israel failed to stem the Palestinian attacks. Israel invaded Lebanon again in 1982 and forcibly expelled the PLO. Israel withdrew to a borderland buffer zone in southern Lebanon, held with the aid of proxy militants in the South Lebanon Army (SLA).

The invasion also led to the conception of a new Shi'a militant group, which in 1985, established itself politically under the name Hezbollah, and declared an armed struggle to end the Israeli occupation of Lebanese territory. When the Lebanese Civil War ended and other warring factions agreed to disarm, both Hezbollah and the SLA refused. Ten years later, Israel withdrew from South Lebanon to the UN-designated and internationally recognized Blue Line border in 2000.

The withdrawal also led to the immediate collapse of the SLA, and Hezbollah quickly took control of the area. Later, citing allegations of Lebanese prisoners in Israel and continued Israeli control of the Shebaa farms region, occupied by Israel from Syria in 1967 but considered by Hezbollah to be part of Lebanon, Hezbollah intensified its cross-border attacks, and used the tactic of seizing soldiers from Israel as leverage for a prisoner exchange in 2004.

In 2005, Syrian forces withdrew from Lebanon.

In August 2006, in an article in The New Yorker, Seymour Hersh claimed that the White House gave the green light for the Israeli government to execute an attack on Hezbollah in Lebanon. Supposedly, communication between the Israeli government and the US government about this came as early as two months in advance of the capture of two Israeli soldiers and the killing of eight others by Hezbollah prior to the conflict in July 2006.

According to Conal Urquhart in The Guardian, the Winograd Committee leaked a testimony from Israeli Prime Minister Ehud Olmert suggesting that Olmert "had been preparing for such a war at least four months before the official casus belli: the capture by Hezbollah of two Israeli soldiers from a border post on 12 July 2006."

=== Abduction efforts in the year prior to conflict ===
In June 2005, an Israel Defense Forces (IDF) paratroop unit operating near the Shebaa Farms engaged three Lebanese it identified as Hezbollah special force members, killing one. Videotapes recovered by the paratroopers contained footage of the three recording detailed accounts of the area.

Over the following 12 months, Hezbollah made three unsuccessful attempts to abduct Israeli soldiers. On 21 November 2005, a number of Hezbollah special forces attempted to attack an Israeli outpost in Ghajar, a village straddling the border between Lebanon and the Golan Heights. The outpost had been deserted following an intelligence warning, and three of the Hezbollah militants were killed when Israeli sniper David Markovich shot a rocket-propelled grenade they were carrying, causing it to explode. From his sniper position, Markovich shot and killed a fourth gunman shortly thereafter.

== Course of the war ==
=== Hezbollah cross-border raid ===
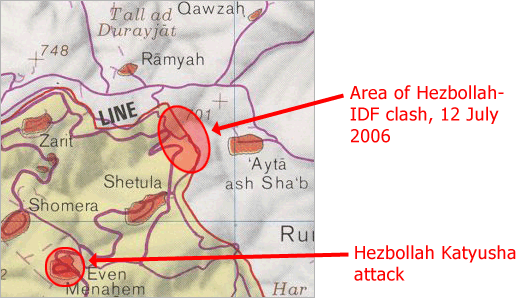
The cross-border raid map

At around 9 am local time on 12 July 2006, Hezbollah launched diversionary rocket attacks toward Israeli military positions near the coast and near the border village of Zar'it as well as on the Israeli town of Shlomi and other villages. Five civilians were injured. Six Israeli military positions were fired on, and the surveillance cameras knocked out.

At the same time, a Hezbollah ground contingent infiltrated the border into Israel through a "dead zone" in the border fence, hiding in an overgrown wadi. They attacked a patrol of two Israeli Humvees patrolling the border near Zar'it, using pre-positioned explosives and anti-tank missiles, killing three soldiers, injuring two, and capturing two soldiers (First Sergeant Ehud Goldwasser and Sergeant First Class Eldad Regev).

In response to the Hezbollah feint attacks, the IDF conducted a routine check of its positions and patrols, and found that contact with two jeeps was lost. A rescue force was immediately dispatched to the area, and confirmed that two soldiers were missing after 20 minutes. A Merkava Mk III tank, an armored personnel carrier, and a helicopter were immediately dispatched into Lebanon. The tank hit a large land mine, killing its crew of four. Another soldier was killed and two lightly injured by mortar fire as they attempted to recover the bodies.

Hezbollah named the attack "Operation Truthful Promise" after leader Hassan Nasrallah's public pledges over the prior year and a half to seize Israeli soldiers and swap them for four Lebanese held by Israel:

- Samir Kuntar (a Lebanese citizen captured during an attack in 1979, accused and later convicted by Israel of murdering civilians and a police officer; Kuntar denied the allegations as fabricated by Israel to malign him);
- Nasim Nisr (an Israeli-Lebanese citizen whom Israel tried and convicted for spying);
- Yahya Skaf (a Lebanese citizen whom Hezbollah claims was arrested in Israel; Israel states that he was killed in action);
- Ali Faratan (another Lebanese citizen whom Hezbollah claimed to be held in Israel, believed to have been shot at sea.).

Nasrallah claimed that Israel had broken a previous deal to release these prisoners, and since diplomacy had failed, violence was the only remaining option. Nasrallah declared that "no military operation will result in rescuing these prisoners... The only method, as I indicated, is that of indirect negotiations and a swap [of prisoners]".

=== Israeli response ===
Israeli Prime Minister Ehud Olmert described the seizure of the soldiers as an "act of war" by the sovereign state of Lebanon, stating that "Lebanon will bear the consequences of its actions" and promising a "very painful and far-reaching response." Israel blamed the Lebanese government for the raid, as it was carried out from Lebanese territory. Hezbollah had two ministers serving in the Lebanese cabinet at that time.

In response, Lebanese Prime Minister Fouad Siniora denied any knowledge of the raid and stated that he did not condone it. An emergency meeting of the Lebanese government reaffirmed this position.

The Israel Defense Forces attacked targets within Lebanon with artillery and airstrikes hours before the Israeli Cabinet met to discuss a response. The targets consisted of bridges and roads in Lebanon, which were hit to prevent Hezbollah from transporting the abductees. An Israeli airstrike also destroyed the runways of Beirut–Rafic Hariri International Airport. Forty-four civilians were killed. The Israeli Air Force also targeted Hezbollah's long-range rocket-and-missile stockpiles, destroying many of them on the ground in the first days of the war. Many of Hezbollah's longer-range rocket launchers were destroyed within the first hours of the Israeli attack.

Later that same day (12 July 2006), the Cabinet decided to authorize the Prime Minister, the Defense Minister and their deputies to pursue the plan which they had proposed for action within Lebanon. Prime Minister Olmert officially demanded that the Israel Defense Forces avoid civilian casualties whenever possible. Israel's chief of staff Dan Halutz said, "if the soldiers are not returned, we will turn Lebanon's clock back 20 years" while the head of Israel's Northern Command Udi Adam said, "this affair is between Israel and the state of Lebanon. Where to attack? Once it is inside Lebanon, everything is legitimate—not just southern Lebanon, not just the line of Hezbollah posts."

On 12 July 2006, the Israeli Cabinet promised that Israel would "respond aggressively and harshly to those who carried out, and are responsible for, today's action". The Cabinet's communiqué stated, in part, that the "Lebanese Government [was] responsible for the action that originated on its soil." A retired Israeli Army Colonel explained that the rationale behind the attack was to create a rift between the Lebanese population and Hezbollah supporters by exacting a heavy price from the elite in Beirut.

On 16 July, the Israeli Cabinet released a communiqué explaining that, although Israel had engaged in military operations within Lebanon, its war was not against the Lebanese government. The communiqué stated: "Israel is not fighting Lebanon but the terrorist element there, led by Nasrallah and his cohorts, who have made Lebanon a hostage and created Syrian- and Iranian-sponsored terrorist enclaves of murder."

When asked in August about the proportionality of the response, Prime Minister Olmert stated that the "war started not only by killing eight Israeli soldiers and abducting two but by shooting Katyusha and other rockets on the northern cities of Israel on that same morning. Indiscriminately." He added "no country in Europe would have responded in such a restrained manner as Israel did."

=== Israeli air and artillery attacks ===
Satellite photographs of the Haret Hreik, a Hezbollah-dominated neighborhood Dahieh district of southern Beirut, Lebanon, before and after 22 July 2006. The neighborhood is home to Hezbollah's headquarters. See also high-resolution photographs before and "after". Archived from the original on 21 August 2007.

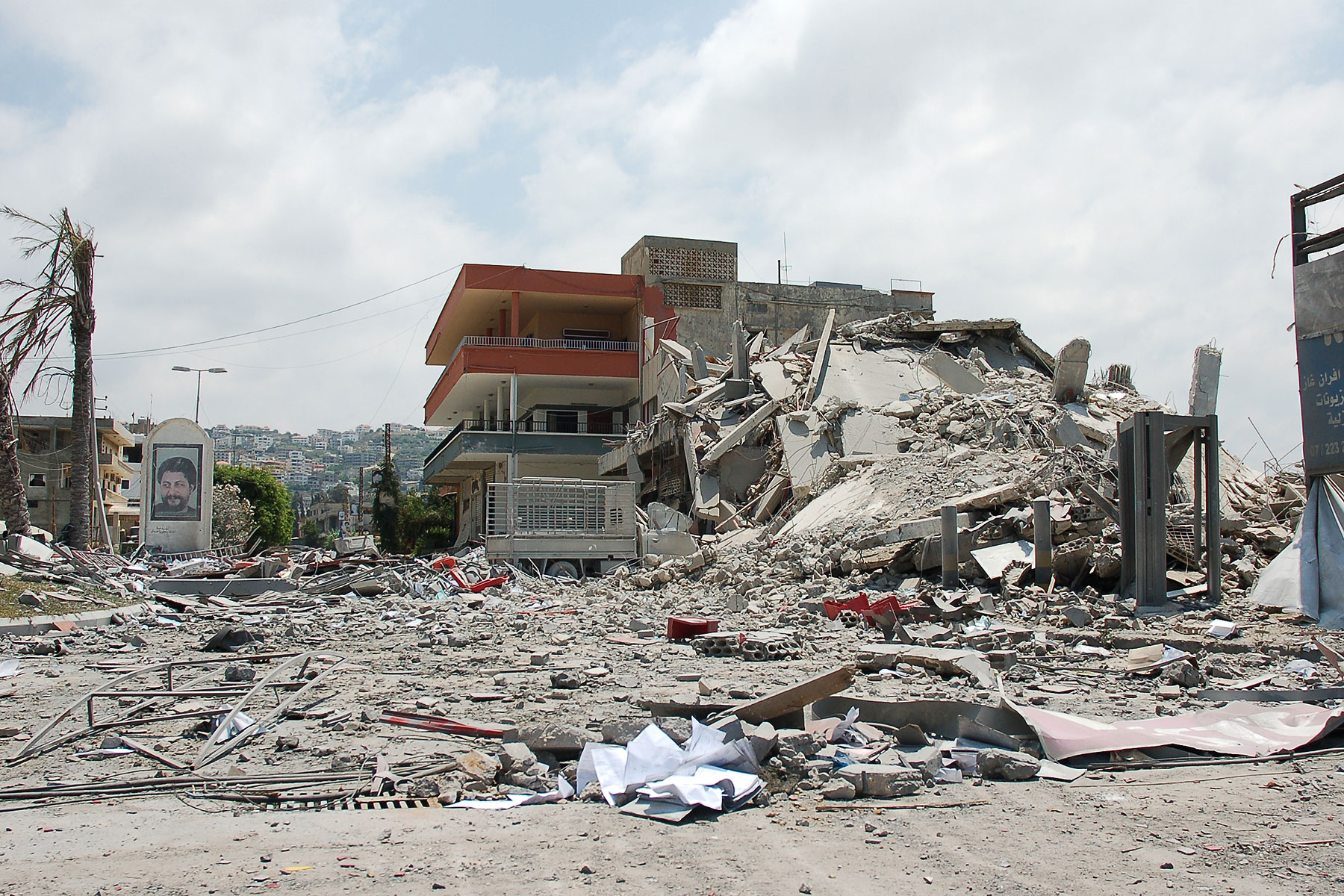
A building in Ghazieh, near Sidon, bombed by the Israeli Air Force (IAF)

During the first day of the war the Israeli Air Force, artillery and navy conducted more than 100 attacks mainly against Hezbollah bases in south Lebanon, among them the regional headquarters in Yatar. Five bridges across the Litani and Zahrani rivers were also destroyed, reportedly to prevent Hezbollah from transferring the abducted soldiers to the north.

Attacks from land, sea and air continued in the following days. Among the targets hit were the Hezbollah headquarters in the southern suburbs of Beirut as well as the offices and homes of the leadership, the compounds of al-Manar TV station and al-Nour radio station, and the runways and fuel depots of the Rafic Hariri International Airport in Beirut. Also targeted were Hezbollah bases, weapons depots and outposts as well as bridges, roads and petrol stations in south Lebanon. Forty-four civilians were killed throughout the day.

It was later reported that the Israel Air Force after midnight, 13 July, attacked and destroyed 59 stationary medium-range Fajr rocket launchers positioned throughout southern Lebanon. Operation Density allegedly only took 34 minutes to carry out but was the result of six years of intelligence gathering and planning. Between half and two-thirds of Hezbollah medium-range rocket capability was estimated by the IDF to have been wiped out. According to Israeli journalists Amos Harel and Avi Issacharoff the operation was "Israel's most impressive military action" and a "devastating blow for Hezbollah". In the coming days IAF allegedly also attacked and destroyed a large proportion of Hezbollah's long range Zelzal-2 missiles.

"All the long-range rockets have been destroyed," chief of staff Halutz allegedly told the Israeli government, "We've won the war."

American officials claimed that the Israelis overstated the effectiveness of the air war against Hezbollah and cited the failure to hit any of the Hezbollah leaders in spite of dropping twenty-three tons of high explosives in a single raid on the Beirut Southern suburbs of Dahiya. The Israeli assessments are "too large," said one US official. Al-Manar TV station only went dark for two minutes after the strike before it was back into the air. The TV station was bombed 15 times during the war but never faltered after the first hiccup.

According to military analyst William Arkin there is "little evidence" that the Israeli Air Force even attempted, much less succeeded in, wiping out the medium- and long-range-rocket capability in the first days of the war. He dismissed the whole claim as an "absurdity" and a "tale". Benjamin Lambeth, however, insisted that it was far-fetched to suggest that the "authoritative Israeli leadership pronouncements" were not based on facts. He admitted however that there was "persistent uncertainty" surrounding the "few known facts and figures" concerning the alleged attacks. Anthony Cordesman believed that IAF probably destroyed most medium- and long-range missiles in the first two days of the war but acknowledged that these claims "have never been validated or described in detail."

Hezbollah long remained silent on the question of its rockets, but on the sixth anniversary of the war, chairman Hassan Nasrallah asserted that Israel had missed them, claiming that Hezbollah had known about Israeli intelligence gathering and had managed to secretly move its platforms and launchers in advance.

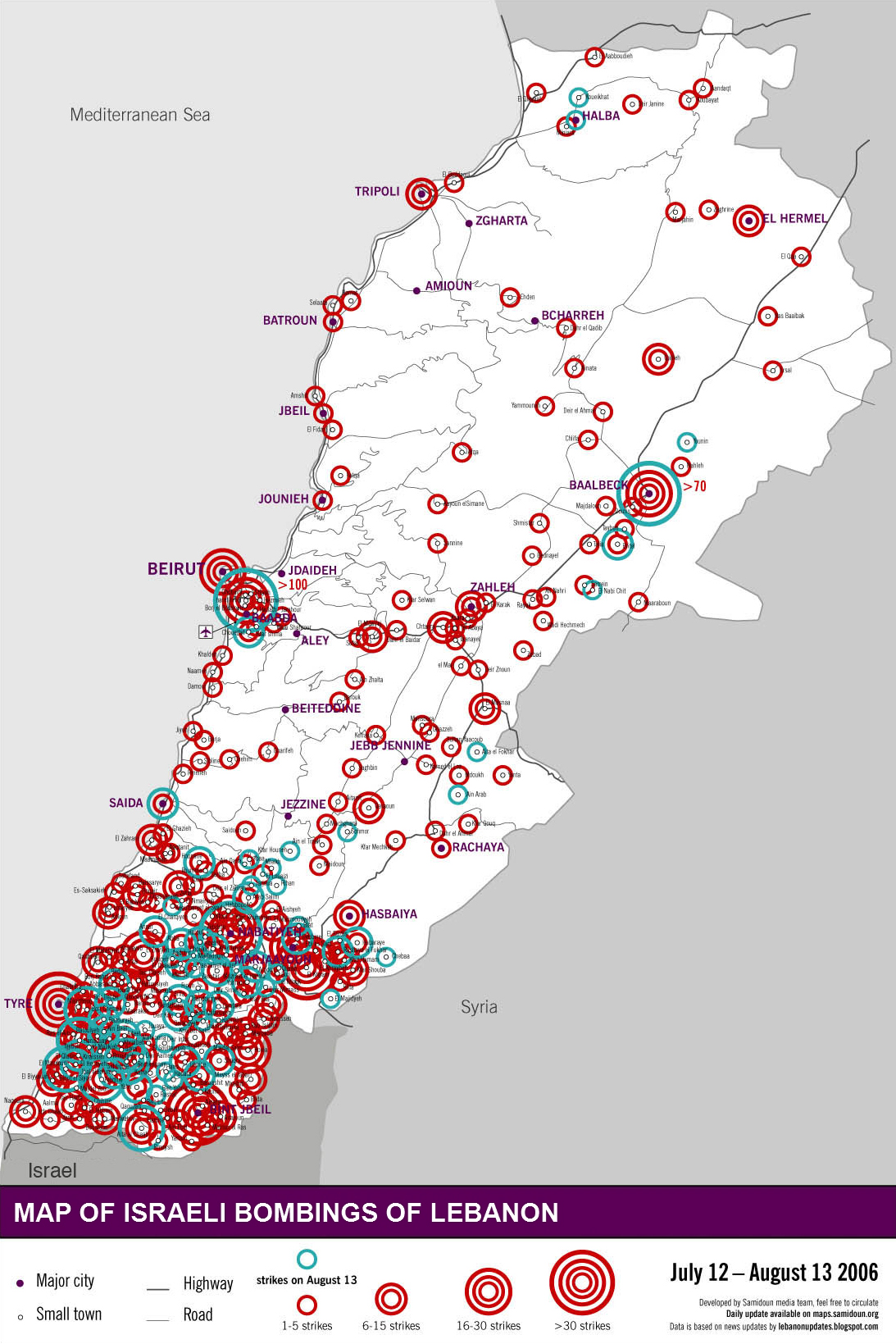
Areas in Lebanon targeted by Israeli bombing, 12 July to 13 August 2006

During the war the Israeli Air Force flew 11,897 combat missions, which was more than the number of sorties during the 1973 October War (11,223) and almost double the number during the 1982 Lebanon War (6,052).

The Israeli artillery fired 170,000 shells, more than twice the number fired in the 1973 October War. A senior officer in the IDF Armored Corps told Haaretz that he would be surprised if it turned out that even five Hezbollah fighters had been killed by the 170,000 shells fired.

The Israeli Navy fired 2,500 shells.

The combined effect of the massive air and artillery bombardment on Hezbollah capacity to fire short-range Katyusha rockets on northern Israel was very meager. According to the findings of the post-war military investigations the IDF shelling succeeded only in destroying about 100 out of 12,000 Katyusha launchers. The massive fire led to a severe shortage of ammunition towards the end of the war.

Northern command had prepared a list before the war on potential Hezbollah targets, identified by the Israeli intelligence, to be struck in case of renewed hostilities. By the fourth day of the war the IDF ran out of targets, as all the 83 targets on the list had already been hit. A high-ranking IDF officer told reporters off the record that the Israeli chief of staff Dan Halutz had ordered the air force to destroy ten 12-story buildings in the Southern suburbs of Beirut for every rocket that fell on Haifa. The statement was denied by the IDF spokesperson.

Large parts of the Lebanese civilian infrastructure, however, were destroyed, including 640 kilometres (400 miles) of roads, 73 bridges, and 31 other targets such as Beirut's Rafic Hariri International Airport, ports, water and sewage treatment plants, electrical facilities, 25 fuel stations, 900 commercial structures, up to 350 schools and two hospitals, and 15,000 homes. Some 130,000 more homes were damaged.

=== Hezbollah rocket attacks ===
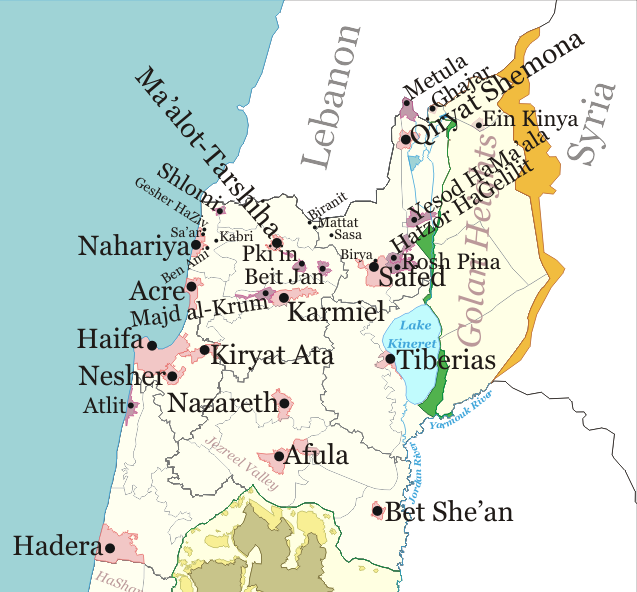
Map showing some of the localities in Israel and the Golan Heights hit by rockets fired from Lebanese soil as of Monday 7 August

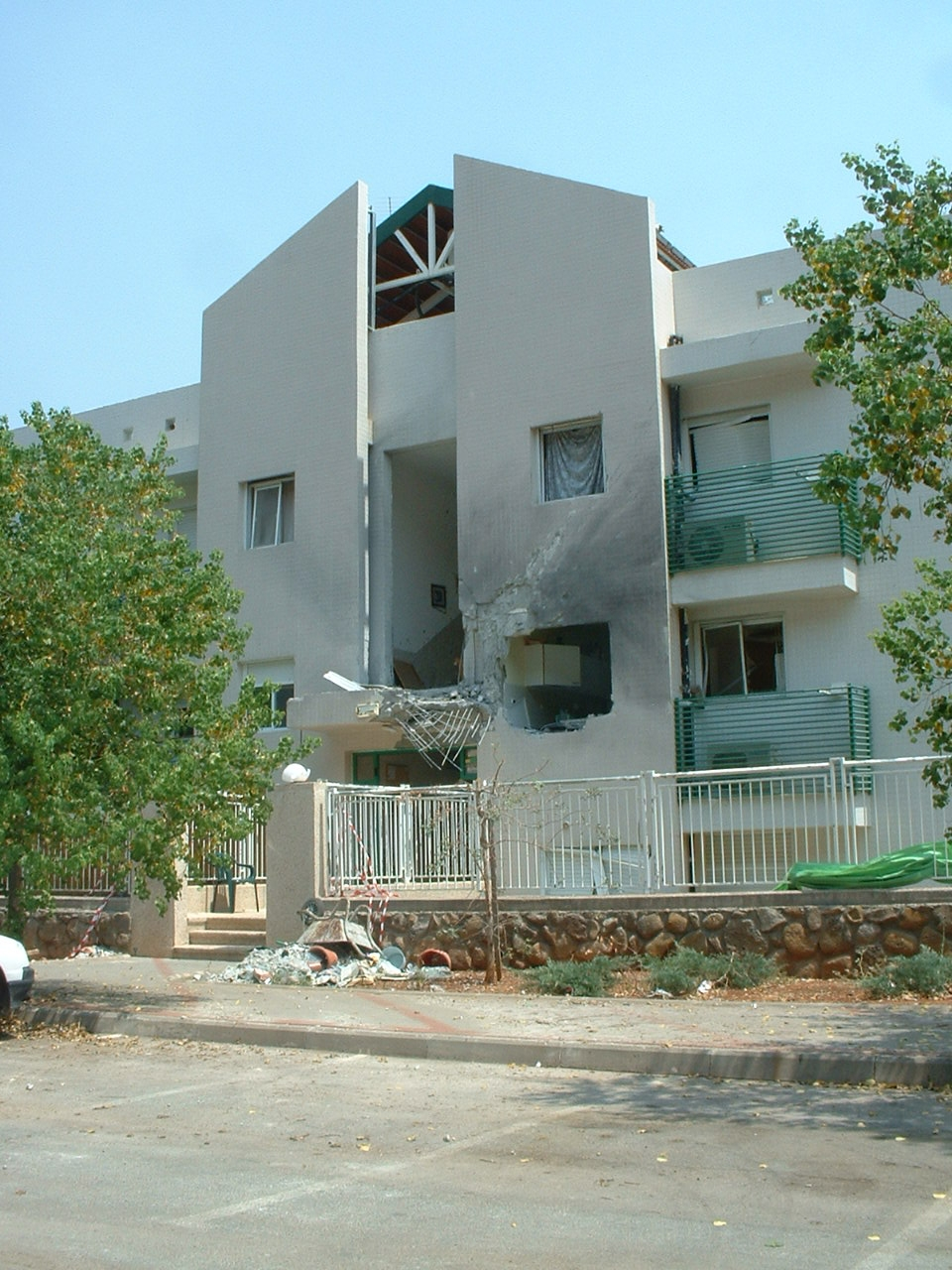
Structural damage of a residential building in Kiryat Shmona after being hit by a rocket

On 16 July, eight employees of the Israel Railways were killed by direct rocket hits on the Haifa train depot. Hezbollah leader Hassan Nasrallah defended the attacks, saying that Hezbollah initially had aimed its rockets on "military sites only". But since Israel, he said, had systematically bombed civilian targets he felt that Hezbollah had no choice but to answer in kind and target Israeli cities.

The attack on the Haifa depot was not the first civilian target to be hit by Hezbollah. Civilians in the border communities were hurt in the initial cover fire on IDF positions for the cross-border raid. Two Israeli civilians were killed in an attack near the air force base at Mount Meron on 14 July. Since Hezbollah rockets were not very accurate it is unclear whether civilians were intentionally targeted in these attacks. After the attack on Haifa, however, Hezbollah made no attempt to cover this fact. According to a Human Rights Watch study civilian Israeli targets were mentioned four times as often in official Hezbollah war time communiques as was military targets.

Hezbollah TV station al-Manar warned both in Arabic and Hebrew specific Israeli communities for future rocket attacks. Similarly Hezbollah sent text messages to warn Israeli residents to evacuate their homes to avoid being targeted by rocket attacks.

Israel published an alleged range card for upgraded Grad rocket launcher placed outside the village of Shihin in the Western sector of South Lebanon, issued by the Artillery Department of the elite Nasr Unit of Hezbollah. This list included 91 targets, 56 of whom were civilian and 27 were IDF posts or bases. The military targets had three-digit reference numbers while civilian targets had double-digit numbers.

During the war, the Hezbollah rocket force fired between 3,970 and 4,228 rockets at a rate of more than 100 per day, unprecedented since the Iran–Iraq War. About 95% of these were 122 mm (4.8 in) Katyusha artillery rockets, which carried warheads up to 30 kg (66 lb) and had a range of up to 30 km (19 mi). An estimated 23% of these rockets hit cities and built-up areas across northern Israel, while the remainder hit open areas.

Cities hit were Haifa, Hadera, Nazareth, Tiberias, Nahariya, Safed, Shaghur, Afula, Kiryat Shmona, Beit She'an, Karmiel, Acre, and Ma'alot-Tarshiha, as well as dozens of towns, kibbutzim, moshavim, and Druze and Israeli-Arab villages. The northern West Bank was also hit.

Israeli Defense Minister Amir Peretz ordered commanders to prepare civil defense plans. One million Israelis had to stay near or in bomb shelters or security rooms, with some 250,000 civilians evacuating the north and relocating to other areas of the country.

After the high number of Lebanese civilian casualties in the Qana airstrike, Israel announced a unilateral freeze in its air attacks on Lebanon. Hezbollah then halted its own rocket attacks on Israel. When Israel resumed its air attacks on Lebanon, Hezbollah followed suit and recommenced rocket attacks on Israeli targets.

Hezbollah rocket attacks also targeted and succeeded in hitting military targets in Israel. The Israeli military censorship was, however, very strict and explicitly forbade Israel-based media from reporting such incidents. The wartime instruction to media stated that "The Military Censor will not approve reports on missile hits at IDF bases and/or strategic facilities." A notable exception was the rocket attack 6 August, on a company of IDF reservists assembling in the border community of Kfar Giladi, which killed twelve soldiers and wounded several others. Initially Israel did not confirm that the victims were military but eventually relented.

On 6 August, two elderly Arab women in Haifa were killed, and an Arab man was mortally wounded, by Hezbollah rocket fire. The day after Hezbollah leader Nasrallah appealed to Haifa's Arab community to leave the city so as not be hurt.

After the initial Israeli response, Hezbollah declared an all-out military alert. Hezbollah was estimated to have 13,000 missiles at the beginning of the conflict. Israeli newspaper Haaretz described Hezbollah as a trained, skilled, well-organized, and highly motivated infantry that was equipped with the cream of modern weaponry from the arsenals of Syria, Iran, Russia, and China. Hezbollah's satellite TV station Al-Manar reported that the attacks had included a Fajr-3 and a Ra'ad 1, both liquid-fuel missiles developed by Iran.

=== Ground war ===
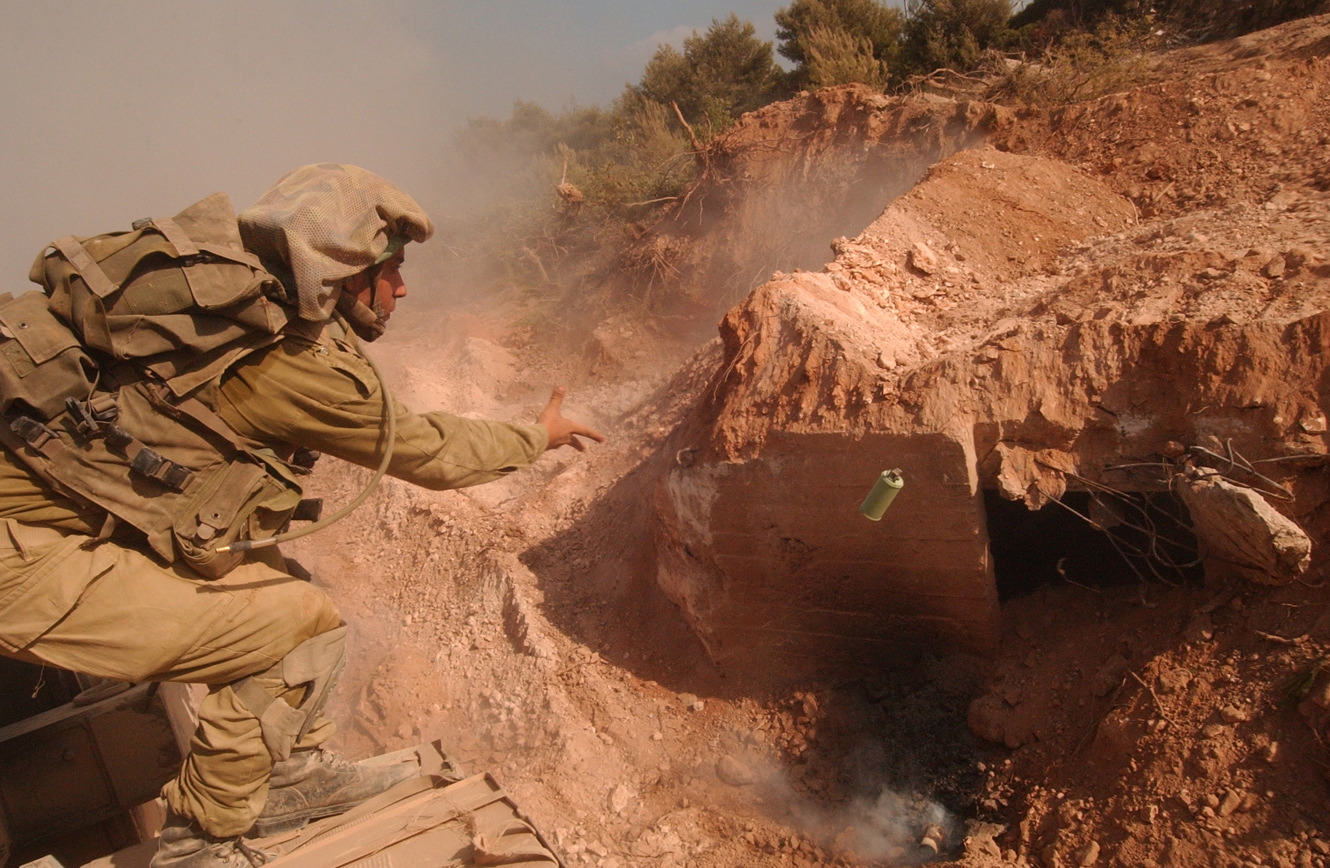
An Israeli soldier tosses a grenade into a Hezbollah bunker.

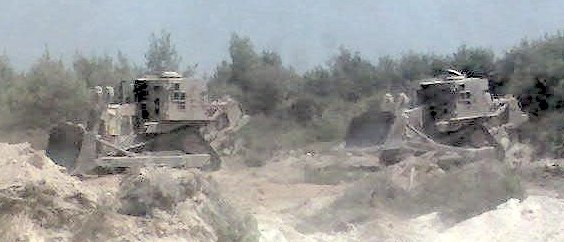
IDF Caterpillar D9N armored bulldozers destroy a Hezbollah bunker.

War map, "Hezbollah Defensive System in Southern Lebanon", 2006

Hezbollah engaged in guerrilla warfare with IDF ground forces, fighting from well-fortified positions, often in urban areas, and attacking with small, well-armed units. Hezbollah fighters were highly trained, and were equipped with flak jackets, night-vision goggles, communications equipment, and sometimes with Israeli uniforms and equipment. An Israeli soldier who participated in the war said that Hezbollah fighters were "nothing like Hamas or the Palestinians. They are trained and highly qualified. All of us were kind of surprised."

During engagements with the IDF, Hezbollah concentrated on inflicting losses on the IDF, believing an unwillingness to absorb steady losses to be Israel's strategic weakness.

Hezbollah countered IDF armor through the use of sophisticated Iranian-made anti-tank guided missiles (ATGMs). According to Merkava tank program administration, 52 Merkava main battle tanks were damaged (45 of them by different kinds of ATGM), missiles penetrated 22 tanks, but only 5 tanks were destroyed, one of them by an improvised explosive device (IED). The Merkava tanks that were penetrated were predominantly Mark II and Mark III models, but five Mark IVs were also penetrated. All but two of these tanks were rebuilt and returned to service.

The IDF declared itself satisfied with the Merkava Mark IV's performance during the war. Hezbollah caused additional casualties using ATGMs to collapse buildings onto Israeli troops sheltering inside. As a result, IDF units did not linger in any one area for an extended period of time. Hezbollah fighters often used tunnels to emerge quickly, fire an anti-tank missile, and then disappear again.

On 19 July a force from the Maglan special forces unit seized a fortified Hezbollah dugout adjacent to the Shaked post; two IDF soldiers and five Hezbollah operatives were killed in the battle.

=== Position of Lebanon ===
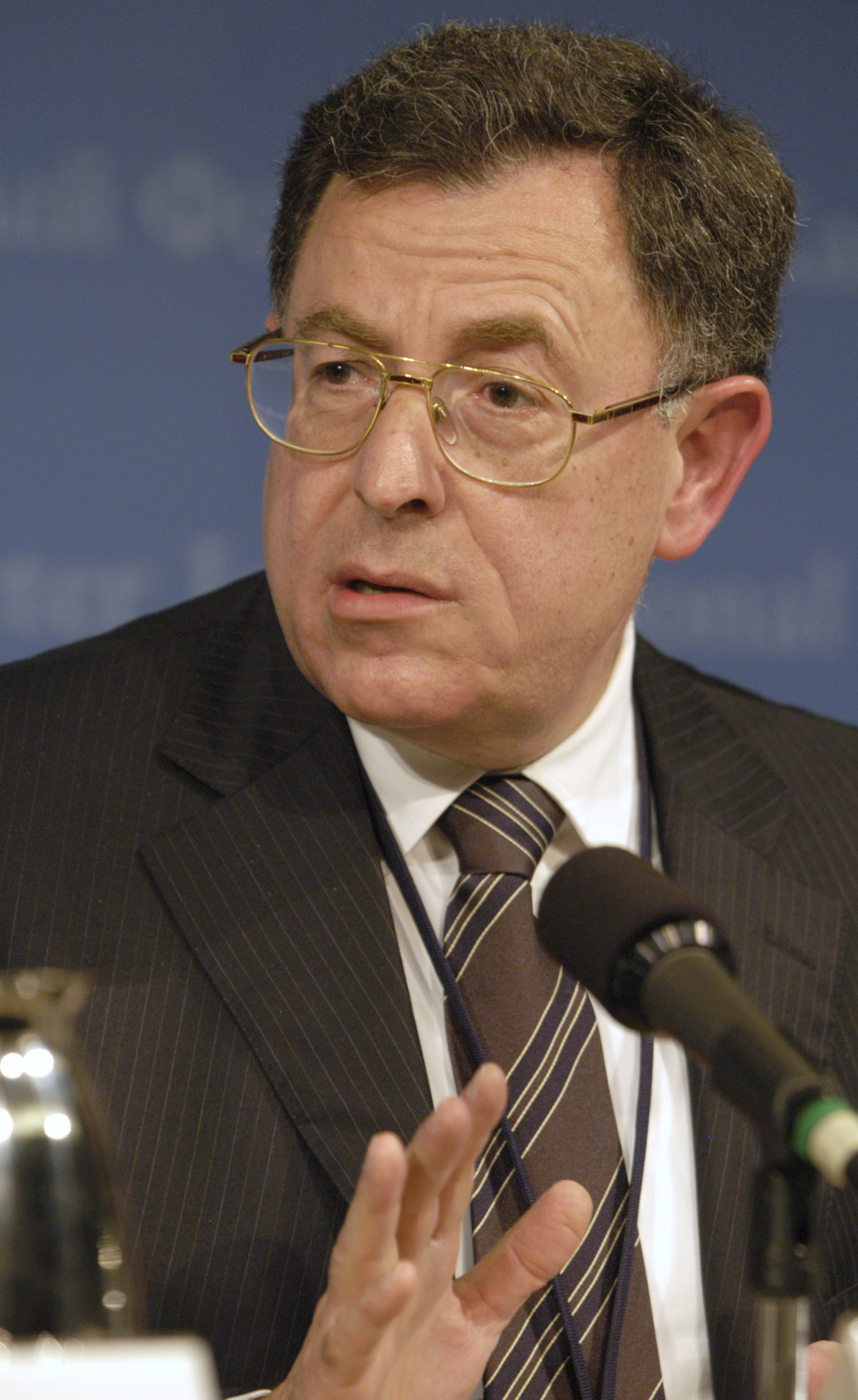
Lebanon's Prime Minister Fouad Siniora

While the Israeli government initially held the Lebanese government responsible for the Hezbollah attacks due to Lebanon's failure to implement United Nations Security Council Resolution 1559 and disarm Hezbollah, Lebanon disavowed the raids, stating that the government of Lebanon did not condone them, and pointing out that Israel had a long history of disregarding UN resolutions.

In interviews, Lebanese President Emile Lahoud criticized Israel's attacks and was supportive of Hezbollah, noting Hezbollah's role in ending Israel's previous occupation of southern Lebanon. On 12 July 2006, PBS interviewed the Lebanese ambassador Farid Abboud to the United States and his Israeli counterpart. The interview discussed Hezbollah's connection to the Lebanese government.

Israel never declared war on Lebanon, and said it only attacked Lebanese governmental institutions which it suspected of being used by Hezbollah. The Lebanese government played a role in shaping the conflict. On 14 July 2006, the office of Lebanese Prime Minister Fouad Siniora issued a statement that called on US President George W. Bush to exert all his efforts on Israel to stop its attacks in Lebanon and reach a comprehensive ceasefire. In a televised speech the next day, Siniora called for "an immediate ceasefire backed by the United Nations."

A US–French draft resolution that was influenced by the Lebanese Siniora Plan and which contained provisions for Israeli withdrawal, military actions, and mutual prisoner release was rejected by the US and Israel. Many Lebanese accused the US government of stalling the ceasefire resolution and of support of Israel's attacks. In a poll conducted two weeks into the conflict, only 8% of the respondents felt that the US would support Lebanon, while 87% supported Hezbollah's fight against Israel. After the attack on Qana, Siniora snubbed US Secretary of State Condoleezza Rice by cancelling a meeting with her and thanked Hezbollah for its "sacrifices for the independence and sovereignty of Lebanon."

During the war, the Lebanese Armed Forces did not engage in direct hostilities, but threatened retaliation if IDF troops pushed too far northward into Lebanon. In several instances, Lebanese troops fired anti-aircraft weapons at Israeli aircraft and attempted to disrupt landing operations. During the first days of the war, Lebanese Defense Minister Elias Murr said that "the Lebanese army will resist and defend the country. If there is an invasion of Lebanon, we are waiting for them." However, the Lebanese Army mostly stayed out of the fighting. According to a Time editorial, "to have stood up to the advancing Israeli armored columns would have been suicidal." On 7 August 2006, the seven-point plan was extended to include the deployment of 15,000 Lebanese Army troops to fill the void between an Israeli withdrawal and UNIFIL deployment.

=== Psychological warfare ===
During the war, Hezbollah broadcaseted warnings in Hebrew and Arabic to specific Israeli communities regarding upcoming rocket attacks, and also sent text messages to warn Israeli residents to evacuate their homes to avoid being hit by rockets. Similarly, the Israeli Air Force dropped 17,000 leaflets over Lebanon in 47 missions, and sent more than 700,000 computerized voice messages. Many of them contained caricatures of Hassan Nasrallah and Hezbollah leading Lebanon to ruin and making civilians suffer, showing them as puppets of Iran and Syria, and calling on civilians to help remove Hezbollah. Another leaflet addressing Hezbollah fighters told them that they were lied to by their leaders, that they were "sent like sheep to be butchered, lacking military training and without proper combat gear", that they could not hope to face "highly trained soldiers that fight to protect their homeland, their people, and their home", referring to them as "mercenaries" without the support of the Lebanese public, and urging them to run and save their lives. On 26 July, Israel dropped leaflets containing illustrations of nine tombstones with the name of a dead Hezbollah fighter on each one, in response to Nasrallah "deceiving" people on the number of Hezbollah casualties. Another leaflet urged Hezbollah fighters to stop bleeding and fighting for Nasrallah, who sat safe in a bunker, to stop fighting against Lebanese national interests, and to return to their homes and families. On 11 August, Israel dropped leaflets accusing Hezbollah of hiding its "great losses", and containing the names of 90 to 100 Hezbollah fighters killed. Israeli technicians also hacked into Al-Manar and broadcast clips, criticizing Nasrallah, showing the bodies of Hezbollah fighters, footage from Israeli raids and airstrikes, and captured Hezbollah equipment.

=== Ceasefire ===
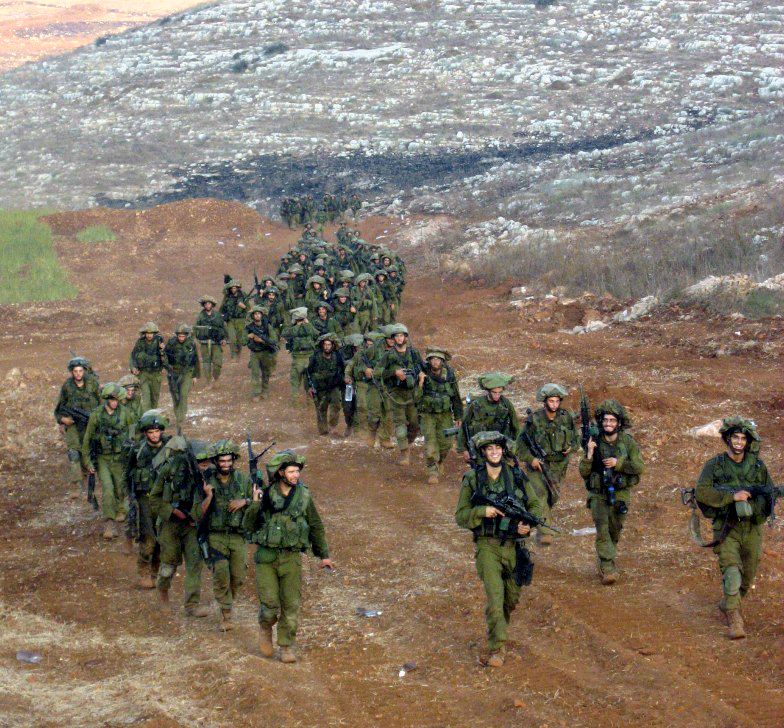
Israeli soldiers of the Nahal Brigade leaving Lebanon

Terms for a ceasefire had been drawn and revised several times over the course of the conflict, yet successful agreement between the two sides took several weeks. Hezbollah maintained the desire for an unconditional ceasefire, while Israel insisted upon a conditional ceasefire, including the return of the two seized soldiers. Lebanon frequently pleaded for the United Nations Security Council to call for an immediate, unconditional ceasefire between Israel and Hezbollah. John Bolton confirmed that the US and UK, with support from several Arab leaders, delayed the ceasefire process. Outsider efforts to interfere with a ceasefire only ended when it became apparent Hezbollah would not be easily defeated.

On 11 August 2006 the United Nations Security Council unanimously approved UN Security Council Resolution 1701, in an effort to end the hostilities. It was accepted by the Lebanese government and Hezbollah on 12 August, and by the Israeli government on 13 August. The ceasefire took effect at 8:00 am (5:00 am GMT) on 14 August.

Before the ceasefire, the two Hezbollah members of cabinet said that their militia would not disarm south of the Litani River, according to another senior member of the Lebanese cabinet, while a top Hezbollah official similarly denied any intention of disarming in the south. Israel said it would stop withdrawing from Southern Lebanon if Lebanese troops were not deployed there within a matter of days.

== War crimes ==
Under international humanitarian law, warring parties are obliged to distinguish between combatants and civilians, ensure that attacks on legitimate military targets are proportionate, and guarantee that the military advantage of such attacks outweigh the possible harm done to civilians. Violations of these laws are considered war crimes. Various groups and individuals accused both Israel and Hezbollah of violations of these laws during the conflict, and warned of possible war crimes. These allegations included intentional attacks on civilian populations or infrastructure, disproportionate or indiscriminate attacks, the use of human shields, and the use of prohibited weapons. No formal charges have been filed against either group.

Amnesty International called on both Hezbollah and Israel to end attacks on civilian areas during the conflict, and criticized attacks against civilian villages and infrastructure by Israel. They also highlighted IDF use of white phosphorus shells in Lebanon. Human Rights Watch accused both parties of failing to distinguish between civilians and combatants, violating the principle of distinction, and committing war crimes. Peter Bouckaert, a senior emergencies researcher for Human Rights Watch, stated that Hezbollah was "directly targeting civilians ... their aim is to kill Israeli civilians" and that Israel had not taken "the necessary precautions to distinguish between civilian and military targets." They criticized Hezbollah's use of unguided Katyusha rockets, and Israel's use of unreliable cluster bombs – both too close to civilians areas – suggesting that they may have deliberately targeted civilians. UN humanitarian chief Jan Egeland said Israel's response violated international humanitarian law, and criticized Hezbollah for "cowardly blending... among women and children." He also called Israel's use of over 100,000 cluster bombs "immoral". According to Egeland, 90% of such bombs were launched by Israel in the last 3 days of combat, when it was known that a UN resolution was on its way.

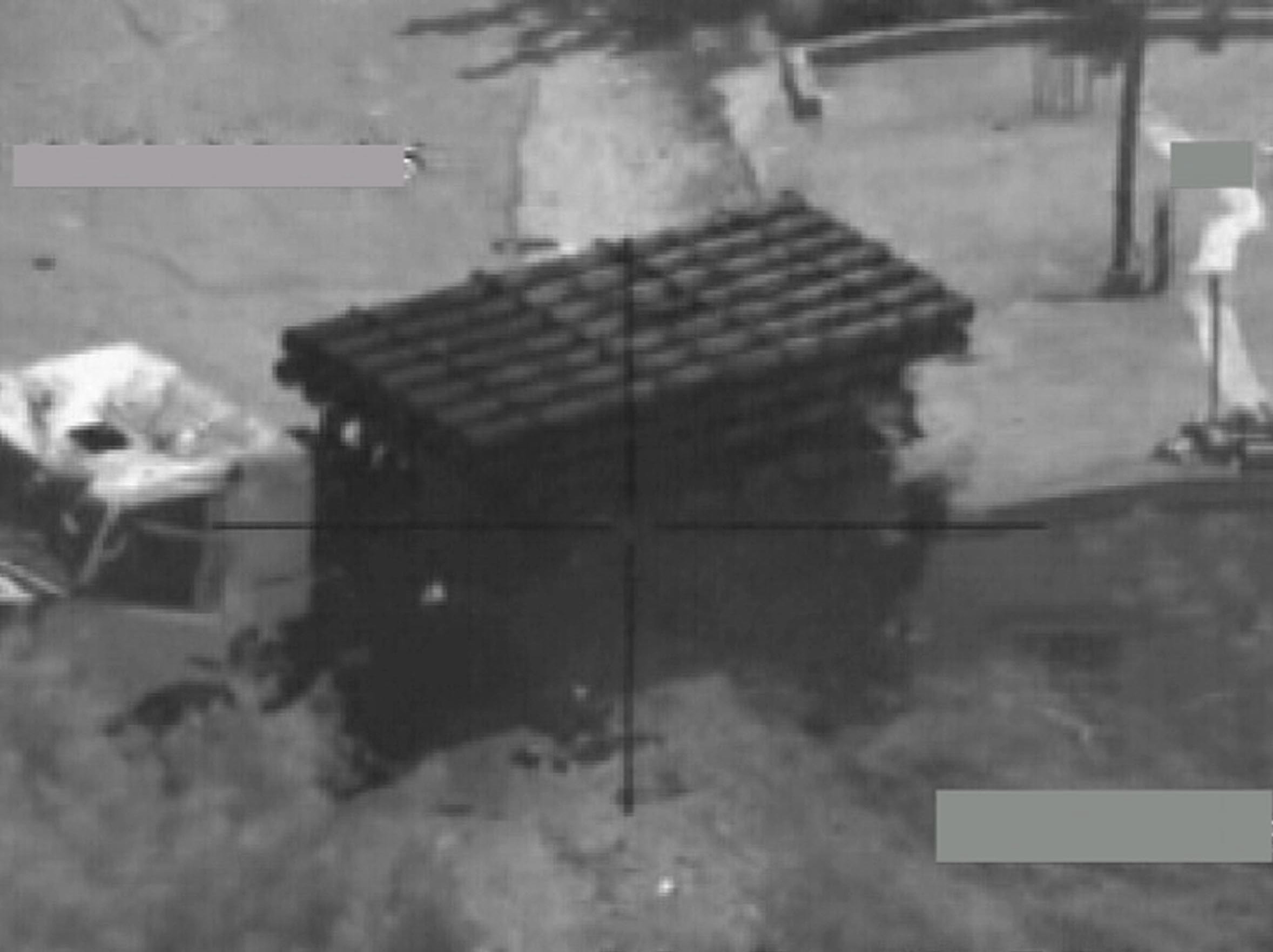
IAF targeting a Katyusha rocket launcher

Israel said that it tried to avoid civilians, and had distributed leaflets calling on civilian residents to evacuate, but that Hezbollah stored weapons in and fired from civilian areas, making those areas legitimate targets, and used civilians as human shields. Amnesty International and Human Rights Watch found cases where Hezbollah did fire rockets from, and store weapons in, populated areas and deploy its forces among the civilian population; however, both say that is not conclusive evidence of the intent to use civilians as human shields. HRW stated that "the IDF struck a large number of private homes of civilian Hezbollah members during the war, as well as various civilian Hezbollah-run institutions such as schools, welfare agencies, banks, shops and political offices." Although Israel maintained that the civilian infrastructure was "hijacked" by Hezbollah and used for military purposes, but Amnesty International identified the destruction of entire civilian neighbourhoods and villages by Israeli forces, attacks on bridges with no apparent strategic value, and attacks on infrastructure indispensable to the survival of the civilian population, and questioned whether the "military advantage anticipated from destroying" civilian infrastructure had been "measured against the likely effect on civilians." They also stated that the Israeli actions suggested a "policy of punishing both the Lebanese government and the civilian population."

Al-Jazeera reported at the time: "Foreign journalists based in Lebanon also reported that the Shia militia chose to fight from civilian areas and had on occasion prevented Lebanese civilians from fleeing conflict-hit areas of south Lebanon. Al-Manar, Hezbollah's satellite channel, also showed footage of Hezbollah firing rockets from civilian areas and produced animated graphics showing how Hezbollah fired rockets at Israeli cities from inside villages in southern Lebanon."

Images obtained by the Sunday Herald Sun show that "Hezbollah is waging war amid suburbia. The images ... show Hezbollah using high-density residential areas as launch pads for rockets and heavy-calibre weapons. Dressed in civilian clothing so they can quickly disappear, the militants carrying automatic assault rifles and ride in on trucks mounted with cannon."

Amnesty International stated, however, that the volume of civilian casualties and damage to civilian infrastructure suggested that Israel was not just trying to target Hezbollah fighters. An AI spokesperson, Kate Gilmore, said that "[t]he pattern, scope and scale of the attacks makes Israel's claim that this was 'collateral damage', simply not credible". "The evidence strongly suggests that the extensive destruction of power and water plants, as well as the transport infrastructure vital for food and other humanitarian relief, was deliberate and an integral part of a military strategy," Gilmore said.

On 24 July 2007, Haaretz reported that the official Israeli inquiry into the war "is to include the examination of claims that the IDF committed war crimes during last summer's fighting."

A 6 September 2007 Human Rights Watch report found that most of the civilian deaths in Lebanon resulted from "indiscriminate Israeli airstrikes", and found that Israeli aircraft targeted vehicles carrying fleeing civilians. In a statement issued before the report's release, the human rights organization said there was no basis to the Israeli government's claim that civilian casualties resulted from Hezbollah guerrillas using civilians as shields. Kenneth Roth, Human Rights Watch executive director, said there were only "rare" cases of Hezbollah operating in civilian villages. "To the contrary, once the war started, most Hizbollah(sic) military officials and even many political officials left the villages," he said. "Most Hizbollah(sic) military activity was conducted from prepared positions outside Lebanese villages in the hills and valleys around." Roth also noted that "Hezbollah fighters often didn't carry their weapons in the open or regularly wear military uniforms, which made them a hard target to identify. But this doesn't justify the IDF's failure to distinguish between civilians and combatants, and if in doubt to treat a person as a civilian, as the laws of war require."

On its final report, issued on 30 January 2008, the Israeli government's Winograd Commission concluded that the Israel Defense Forces did not commit violations or war crimes, as alleged by the Human Rights Watch, Amnesty International, and other NGOs. The Commission claimed that the evidence shows that the Israel Defense Forces did not target civilians, in contrast to Hezbollah and to denunciations by NGOs, and explained that terms like "war crimes" are without basis. This report also acknowledged that Israel used cluster bombs illegally, stating that "Israel must consider whether it wants to continue using cluster bombs in the future, because its current manner of employing them does not conform to international law."

=== Cluster and phosphorus munitions ===
Both sides used cluster bombs during the conflict. Israel fired 4.6 million submunitions into dozens of towns and villages in southern Lebanon in 962 separate strikes, around 90% within the final 72 hours of the war, when the conflict already had been largely resolved by UN Security Council Resolution 1701. Entire towns were covered in cluster bombs. The unguided rockets were fired from mobile rocket launching platforms. To compensate for the inaccuracy of the rockets, the areas were flooded with munitions. Israel claimed to have warned civilians prior to a strike, and that firing was limited to open areas or military targets inside urban areas. Israel used advanced cluster munitions produced by Israel Military Industries, and large numbers of older cluster bombs, some produced in the 1970s, purchased from aging American stockpiles. These were fired by multiple rocket launchers, 155 mm artillery guns, and dropped by aircraft. As many as 1 million submunitions failed to explode on impact, lingering as land mines that killed or maimed almost 200 people since the war ended. As of 2011, munitions were still causing casualties and being cleared by volunteers.

Hezbollah fired 4,407 submunitions into civilian-populated areas of northern Israel in 113 separate strikes, using Chinese made Type-81 122 mm rockets, and Type-90 submunitions. These attacks killed one civilian and wounded twelve.

Human Rights Watch "found that the IDF's use of cluster munitions was both indiscriminate and disproportionate, in violation of international humanitarian law, and in some locations possibly a war crime" because "the vast majority [were dropped] over the final three days when Israel knew a settlement was imminent." After the ceasefire, parts of southern Lebanon remained uninhabitable due to Israeli unexploded cluster bomblets.

Also phosphorus shells were used by the IDF to attack civilian areas in Lebanon. The shells were originally designed to generate a smoke screen in a battlefield situation, but white phosphorus is also especially harmful to humans because its burning will continue inside the flesh. The shelling was investigated as a violation of international law.

== Casualties and damage ==
=== Total Lebanese casualties ===
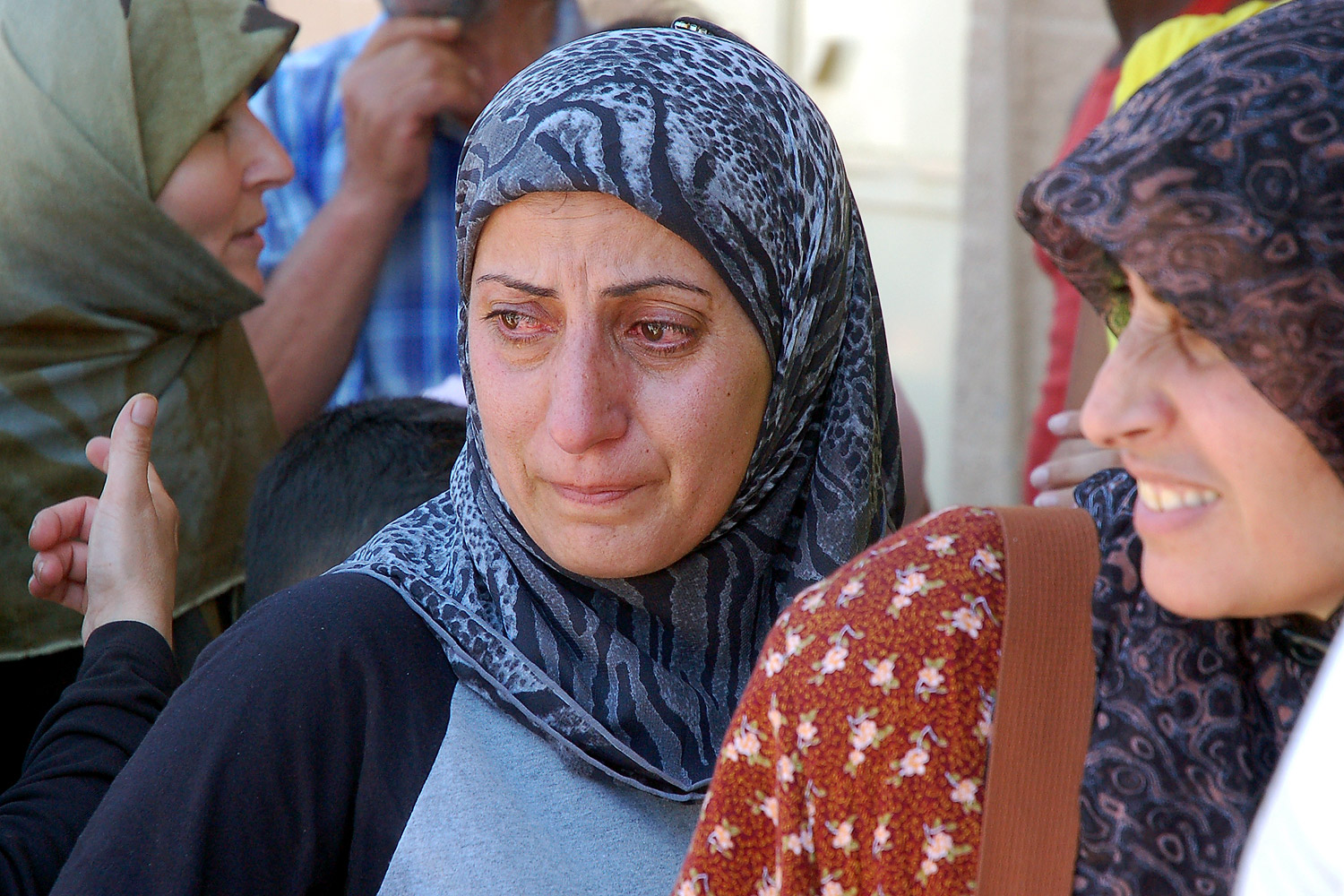
Lebanese IDPs in south Lebanon, 2006

The Lebanese civilian death toll is difficult to pinpoint as most published figures, including those released by the Lebanese government, do not distinguish between civilians and Hezbollah combatants. In addition, Hezbollah fighters can be difficult to identify as many do not wear military uniforms. However, it has been widely reported that the majority of the Lebanese killed were civilians, and UNICEF estimated that 30% of Lebanese killed were children under the age of 13. The Lebanese top police office and the Lebanon Ministry of Health, citing hospitals, death certificates, local authorities, and eyewitnesses, put the death toll at 1,123—37 soldiers and police officers, 894 identified victims, and 192 unidentified ones. The Lebanon Higher Relief Council (HRC) put the Lebanese death toll at 1,191, citing the health ministry and police, as well as other state agencies. The Associated Press estimated the figure at 1,035. In February 2007, the Los Angeles Times reported that at least 800 Lebanese had died during fighting, and other articles have estimated the figure to be at least 850. Encarta states that "estimates ... varied from about 850 to 1,200" in its entry on Israel, while giving a figure of "more than 1,200" in its entry on Lebanon. The Lebanon Higher Relief Council estimated the number of Lebanese injured to be 4,409, 15% of whom were permanently disabled.

The death toll estimates do not include Lebanese killed since the end of fighting by land mines or unexploded Israeli cluster bombs. Between the end of the war and November 2008, approximately 40 people were killed and over 270 injured by cluster bombs.

=== Hezbollah and other militias ===
During the war Hezbollah kept a firm lid on its casualties. Although it did sometimes announce casualty numbers in specific clashes, the party did not publish a comprehensive estimate for the duration of the war. A tally made by Associated Press counted to 70 dead Hezbollah fighters officially acknowledged by the party during the war. Intelligence analysts Alastair Crooke and Mark Perry reported a few months after the war a total of 184 "Shiite martyr funerals" having been held in Lebanon since the war. They considered this number an indication of Hezbollah fatalities but warned that it could be revised upward in the future.

Four months after the end of the war the deputy chairman of the Hezbollah Political Council Mahmoud Qomati for the first time presented Hezbollah's official estimate of its losses. He claimed that 250 fighters had been killed in the war.

The NGO Human Rights Watch (HRW) specifically studied 94 IDF air, artillery, and ground attacks during the war that claimed the lives of 561 persons. Only 51 of these victims were Hezbollah combatants and about half of them were women or children. HRW said it documented the identities of another 548 fatalities, bringing the total of identified Lebanese deaths in the war to 1109. It argued (as an extrapolation from those 94 attacks) that an estimated 250 of these were Hezbollah combatants and the remaining 860 were civilians.

Lebanese officials cited in The Daily Telegraph estimated Hezbollah's losses at 500 killed. A UN official also estimated Hezbollah's losses at 500, though with not all of them being front-line fighters.

The Israeli Military Intelligence (AMAN) in November 2006 estimated that some 650 Hezbollah operatives were killed, while over 800 were wounded.

Three years after the outbreak of war the Israel Foreign Affairs Ministry published a summary of the war which concluded that "over 600" Hezbollah fighters were killed in the war.

IDF Maj.-Gen. (res.) Yaakov Amidror claimed that IDF had identified the names and addresses of 440 members of Hezbollah who were killed in the war. Based on this number he estimated that the total amounted killed in the war to between 500 and 700.

According to the Yedioth Ahronoth Encyclopedia of the Second Lebanon War, the main reason for the discrepancy between Lebanese and Israeli estimates of the number of Hezbollah fatalities during the war (300 versus 700, respectively) was that the former included only Hezbollah military while the latter also included civilian members of Hezbollah.

The Amal movement, a Shiite militia that fought alongside Hezbollah, suffered 17 dead. Armed elements of the Lebanese Communist Party suffered twelve dead. The Popular Front for the Liberation of Palestine – General Command, a Palestinian militia, lost two fighters in an Israeli air raid.

==== Hezbollah commanders ====
Cordesman (2007) wrote that some IDF officers claimed that "significant parts of the key [Hezbollah] leaders and cadres were killed or captured but Israel has given no details of such successes since the war".

On 19 July, a suspected bunker in southern Beirut was attacked with 23 tons of bombs. Israeli intelligence leaked that 12 senior Hezbollah members had attended a meeting in the bunker and that among those killed was military chief Imad Mughniya. Chairman Hassan Nasrallah himself was said to have been wounded in the attack.

The IDF also claimed to have killed Abu Jaafar, the regional commander of central sector, in a clash in or air strike on Maroun ar-Ras. Sheikh Nabil Qaouk, commander in South Lebanon was reportedly killed in a missile strike on a building in Tyre, where 13 civilians were wounded. All of these supposedly dead Hezbollah leaders later appeared in public seemingly unscathed. By the end of July, IDF claimed that about 40, mostly anonymous, "top-level commanders and officials" had been killed.

IDF also named a few Hezbollah commanders who could not identified after the war, such as Jihad Attiya, said to be a logistical coordinator and Nour Shalhoub, a supposed arms transporter.

In the beginning of August IDF reported that several "senior Hezbollah operatives" were killed in a commando raid on a building in Tyre. Four years later IDF admitted that the senior Hezbollah figure, who was the target of the raid, was not killed but had escaped.

During the war, Hezbollah never commented on these issues or simply offered flat denials. But shortly after the war (27 August), Hezbollah General-Secretary Hassan Nasrallah gave an interview to New TV, In this interview he conceded that between ten and twelve Hezbollah commanders had been killed in the war. None of the first or second levels of the leadership were harmed. But three commanders of the third level were killed; an operations officer in the Bint Jbeil axis, a logistics officer and a third commander involved in the military side of the party. In addition three or four town commanders and four or five village commanders were killed in the war.

Nasrallah did not mention any names but the killed commanders were later identified by Hezbollah newspaper Al-Intiqad (and later republished by Hezbollah magazine al-Ahed). The three slain mid-level leaders were dubbed the "Three Knights" of the Islamic Resistance:

- Khalid Bazzi ("al-Hajj Qasim") from Bint Jbeil was chief of operations in the Bint Jbeil area, including Maroun al-Ras, Aynata, Aytaroun and Bint Jbeil. He led the operation where two Israeli soldiers were captured. He was killed 29 July 2006 in an air strike on a house in the old city of Bint Jbeil, together with two other Hezbollah members. Bazzi's death or significant role was never commented on by Israel.
- Muhammad Qanso ("Sajid ad-Duwayr") from the village of ad-Duwayr was a commander in the Hezbollah Special Force, who replaced Bazzi as commander of Bint Jbeil sector. He was killed 11 August in an air raid outside the village of Beit Yahoun, about five kilometres to the north of Bint Jbeil.
- Muhammad Sorour ("Jihad al-'Amili") from Ayta ash-Sha'b was a logistics officer. He was killed in an air raid on the village of Barish on 25 July. Sorour's death was never commented on by Israel.

"Sajid ad-Duwayr" was the only dead Hezbullah commander correctly identified by IDF during the war. However, IDF did not learn his true identity (Muhammad Qanso) and got both the time and the place of his death wrong. He has not killed in the morning of 14 August and was not killed in either Bint Jbeil or Beirut's southern suburbs. And he was "a" commander, not "the" commander of Hezbollah Special Force.

Muhammad Abu Ta'am was commander of Hezbollah forces in the town Bint Jbeil. He was killed in the same air strike as sector commander Khalid Bazzi.

Two Hezbollah commanders were killed in battles around Wadi Hujeir/Wadi Sulouqi. Rani Adnan Bazzi died in hand-to-hand combat, together with seven of his men, in the town of al-Ghandouriya, controlling the strategic wadi crossing. A further three fighters were wounded in the battle and one of them were taken prisoner by the IDF.

Commander Ali Mahmoud Salih ("Bilal") fought singlehandedly further up the wadi, firing ATGM rockets at the advancing Israeli tanks. In the end he was severely wounded by a drone strike and died some time later from his wounds.

==== Hezbollah prisoners ====
On 21 July, Israel Chief-of-Staff Dan Halutz presented one of the objective of the war as the "taking terrorists alive." He repeatedly ordered Israeli troops during the war to capture Hezbollah bodies "to show to the media".

On 24 July the IDF announced that it had captured two Hezbollah fighters in Battle of Maroun al-Ras, the first it had captured in the war. According to Brig.Gen. Alon Friedman the prisoners were held in Israel.

During a raid on Baakbek on 1 August, the IDF captured five Lebanese citizens, described by the IDF as "known Hezbollah gunmen". All five were later identified as civilians and released three weeks later.

Israel claimed to have captured five Hezbollah fighters August 3, during a clash in Rajamin in which three Israeli soldiers were killed. On 8 August, Israel announced that it had also captured five Hezbollah "terrorists" in the Bint Jbeil area. The fighters were caught while sleeping and were carrying heavy weapons.

A few days after the ceasefire IDF launched a second, seemingly unsuccessful, raid on Baalbek that led to the death of Lieutenant Colonel Emmanuel Moreno. According to The Jerusalem Post, two Hezbollah fighters were reportedly taken prisoner in the raid.

Most of the alleged Hezbollah fighters apprehended by IDF during the war, later turned out to be ordinary Lebanese civilians. At the end of the war, Israel held only four Hezbollah fighters as prisoners (plus a civilian Hezbollah member and former fighter). None of them were commanders or Iranians. They were released in a prisoner swap with Israel in 2008. Israel had also seized the bodies of twelve dead Hezbollah fighters and brought them to Israel. They were returned to Lebanon in the prisoner exchange.

=== Lebanese Armed Forces ===
Though rarely engaged in combat, 43 Lebanese soldiers and policemen were killed.

=== Israeli civilians ===
Hezbollah rockets and mortars killed 44 Israeli civilians during the conflict, including a severely wounded Haifa resident who died from his wounds more than a year after the war. In addition four elderly died of heart attacks during rocket attacks. At least 19 of the 46 Israeli civilians killed by Hezbollah rockets and mortars were Israeli Arabs (mainly Sunni Muslims). The last civilian victim was an Israeli-Arab man who died on 30 August 2007, from injuries sustained in a rocket attack on Haifa. In addition, 4,262 civilians were injured—33 seriously wounded, 68 moderately, 1,388 lightly, and 2,773 suffered from shock and anxiety. According to Human Rights Watch, "These bombs may have killed 'only' 43 civilians, but that says more about the availability of warning systems and bomb shelters throughout most of northern Israel and the evacuation of more than 350,000 people than it does about Hezbollah's intentions."

Israeli Military and Civilian casualties in the 2006 Lebanese war
Date	Soldiers			Civilians		Rockets fired on Israel
Date	Killed	Wounded	Captured	Killed	Wounded	Rockets fired on Israel
12 July	8	4	2		2	22
13 July		2		2	67	125
14 July	4	2		2	19	103
15 July		4			16	100
16 July		17		8	77	47
17 July					28	92
18 July		1		1	21	136
19 July	2	15		2	18	116
20 July	5	8			16	34
21 July	1	3			52	97
22 July		7			35	129
23 July				2	45	94
24 July	4	27			17	111
25 July		10		2	60	101
26 July	8	31		1	32	169
27 July		6			38	109
28 July		10			19	111
29 July		7			10	86
30 July		8			81	156
31 July		12			25	6
1 August	3	12				4
2 August	1	41		1	88	230
3 August	4	22		8	76	213
4 August	3	25		3	97	194
5 August	2	70		4	59	170
6 August	12	35		4	150	189
7 August	3	35			12	185
8 August	6	74			10	136
9 August	15	186			36	166
10 August	2	123		2	21	155
11 August	1	76			26	123
12 August	24	131			24	64
13 August	9	203		1	105	217
14 August		37			2	
15 August	2					
Total	119	1244	2	43	1384	3990

Israeli civilians killed by Hezbollah rocket attacks, 12 July – 13 August 2006 (black) vs. the ethnic composition at the North of Israel (pink):

=== Israel Defense Forces ===
A total of 121 IDF soldiers were killed in the war, including the two soldiers who were seized in the cross-border raid that started the war. Their fates were not confirmed until their bodies were exchanged for Lebanese prisoners in 2008.

Of the IDF fatalities, 68 were privates or Non-Commission Officers, 27 Warrant Officers and 26 Officers (9 Lieutenants, 8 Captains, 8 Majors and one Colonel).

Matériel losses in the Israeli Defense Forces accounted for fewer than 20 tanks, depending in the source. Five tanks were damaged beyond repair ('lasting vehicle kills'), 22 tanks received armor penetrations, and 52 tanks suffered some form of damage. Other sources claim 20 main battle tanks were destroyed (6 to mines, 14 to anti-tank guided missiles—all Merkava II, III or IV).

Three helicopters were lost to accidents and one to Hezbollah missile fire. One fixed-wing F-16 was lost during take-off. Three Hermes 450 drones were lost during the war, two by technical difficulties and one by an operator error.

On 14 July, a Hezbollah operated a Chinese C-802 anti-ship missile, that struck the Israeli Navy's flagship INS Hanit killing 4 sailors and damaging the warship on the waterline, under the aft superstructure. The attack set the flight deck on fire and crippled the propulsion systems inside the hull. However, INS Hanit stayed afloat, withdrew and made the rest of the journey back to Ashdod port for repairs under its own power. The four crew members killed during the attack were: Staff Sergeant Tal Amgar, Corporal Shai Atas, Sergeant Yaniv Hershkovitz, and First Sergeant Dov Steinshuss.

=== UN personnel ===
Four United Nations Military Observers were killed and several more wounded.

=== Environmental and archeological damage ===
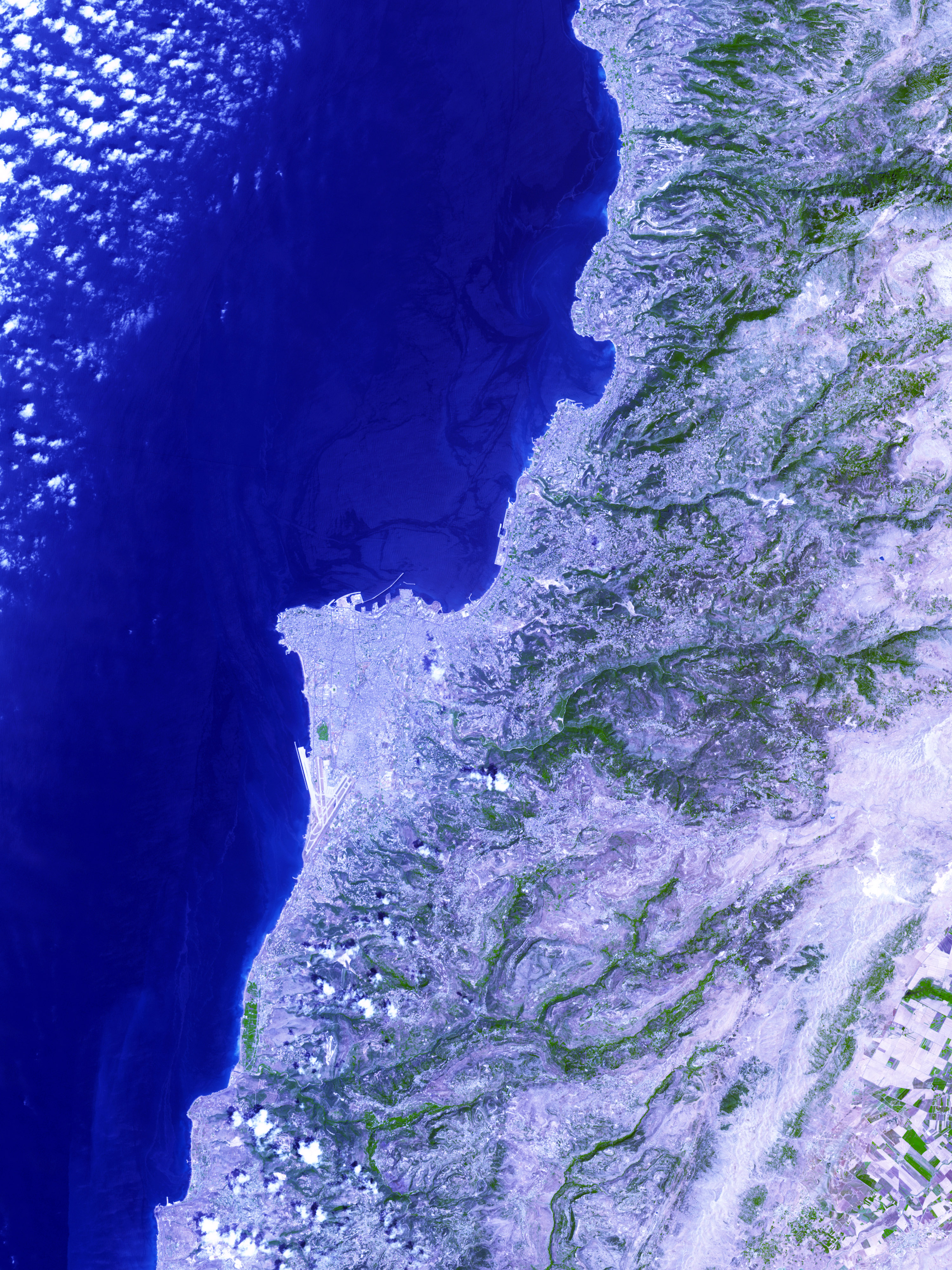
Image from space showing Jiyyeh oil slick in darkest blue, picture centered on Beirut. The largest oil spill in the history of the Mediterranean, it was caused by an Israeli air strike on Jiyeh power station on 10 August 2006.

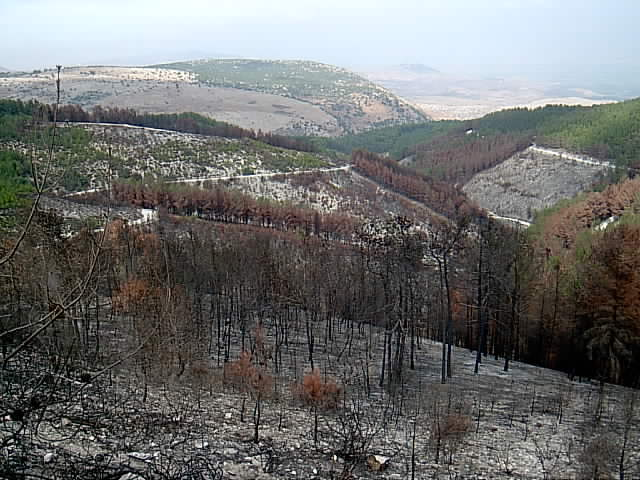
A burnt forest in northern Israel caused by Hezbollah rockets

On 13 July 2006, and again on 15 July, the Israeli Air Force bombed the Jiyeh power station, 30 km (19 mi) south of Beirut, resulting in the largest-ever oil spill in the Mediterranean Sea. The plant's damaged storage tanks leaked an estimated 12,000 to 15,000 tonnes (more than 4 million gallons) of oil into the eastern Mediterranean. A 10-kilometre-wide (6.2 mi) oil slick covered 170 km (105 statute miles) of coastline, and threatened Turkey and Cyprus. The slick killed fish including the Atlantic bluefin tuna, a species already nearing extinction in the Mediterranean, and threatened the habitat of the endangered green sea turtle. It also potentially increased the risk of cancer in humans. An additional 25,000 tons of oil burned at the power station, creating a "toxic cloud" that rained oil downwind. The Lebanese government estimated it would take 10 years to recover from the damage of the strike. The UN estimated the cost for the initial clean-up at $64 million.

Hezbollah rocket attacks caused numerous forest fires inside northern Israel, particularly on the Naftali mountain range near Kiryat Shmona. As many as 16,500 acres (67 km^{2}) of land, including forests and grazing fields, were destroyed by Hezbollah rockets. The Jewish National Fund estimated that it would take 50 to 60 years to rehabilitate the forests.

Israeli bombing also caused significant damage to the World Heritage Sites of Tyre and Byblos. In Tyre a Roman tomb was damaged and a fresco near the centre of the site collapsed. In Byblos, a medieval tower was damaged and Venetian-period remains near the harbour were dramatically stained by the oil slick and were considered to be difficult to clean. Damage was also caused to remains at Bint Jbeil and Chamaa, and to the Temple of Bacchus in Baalbek.

=== Industrial damage ===
Damage to various industries occurred during the war. This includes Lebanon's largest dairy farm Liban Lait in the Bekka area, the Maliban Glassworks in Tannayel, Dalal Industries (a factory which produces prefabricated homes), a dealership for Procter & Gamble, two electricity transformers in south Lebanon cutting off power to the city of Tyre and fuel tanks of an oil-fired power station in Jiyeh. A report from the Lebanese Council for Development and Reconstruction (CDR) said that the IDF bombing campaign had destroyed more than 900 small and medium enterprises with damage to Lebanon's civilian infrastructure estimated close to US$2.5 billion. The material damage to the private sector was estimated at $200 million with an anticipated increase in that figure due to cancelled contracts.

Other repair and rebuilding costs resulting from the bombing include power supplies ($208m), telecoms ($99m), water ($74m) and military installations ($16m). The Lebanese national airline, MEA, had also been grounded for the duration of the conflict. Agricultural activity, particularly in south Lebanon, was abandoned due to the fighting and bombing of the irrigation system. Tourism, which accounts for 15% of Lebanon's GDP, has been severely disrupted by the conflict. Damage to communal and business infrastructure, the Israeli-imposed sea-and-air blockade and continued instability is preventing and deterring tourists. Foreign visitors had been expected to bring in $2.5 to $3 billion US during 2006.

IDF bombing has damaged irrigation canals, open water channels, and underground water diversion pipes which run Litani River water to more than 10,000 acres (40 km^{2}) of farmland, villages in southern Lebanon and the Bekaa Valley. These attacks have been criticised as an attempt to "lay claim to Lebanon's prime watersheds". Attacks on the Litani Dam were also criticised. Israeli officials explained the damage to the water infrastructures was unintentional and collateral to attacks on roads and bridges used by Hezbollah.

The international journalists' representative body, Reporters without Borders, reported that, to its knowledge, the IDF had damaged transmitting equipment in the Satka area of Beirut and reduced the premises of Al Manar to ruins. The IDF contend that the Al-Manar TV facilities which they bombed represent the propaganda arm of Hezbollah and were a legitimate target for the IDF military. Reporters Without Borders disputes this saying that the station "cannot be viewed as [a] military" target. A statement issued by the Israeli Foreign Ministry read: "The Al-Manar station has for many years served as the main tool for propaganda and incitement by Hezbollah, and has also helped the organization recruit people into its ranks." The Committee to Protect Journalists responded by saying: "While Al-Manar may serve a propaganda function for Hezbollah, it does not appear based on a monitoring of its broadcasts today to be serving any discernible military function".

== Reactions ==
=== International action and reaction ===
Israel Solidarity Rally in Los Angeles

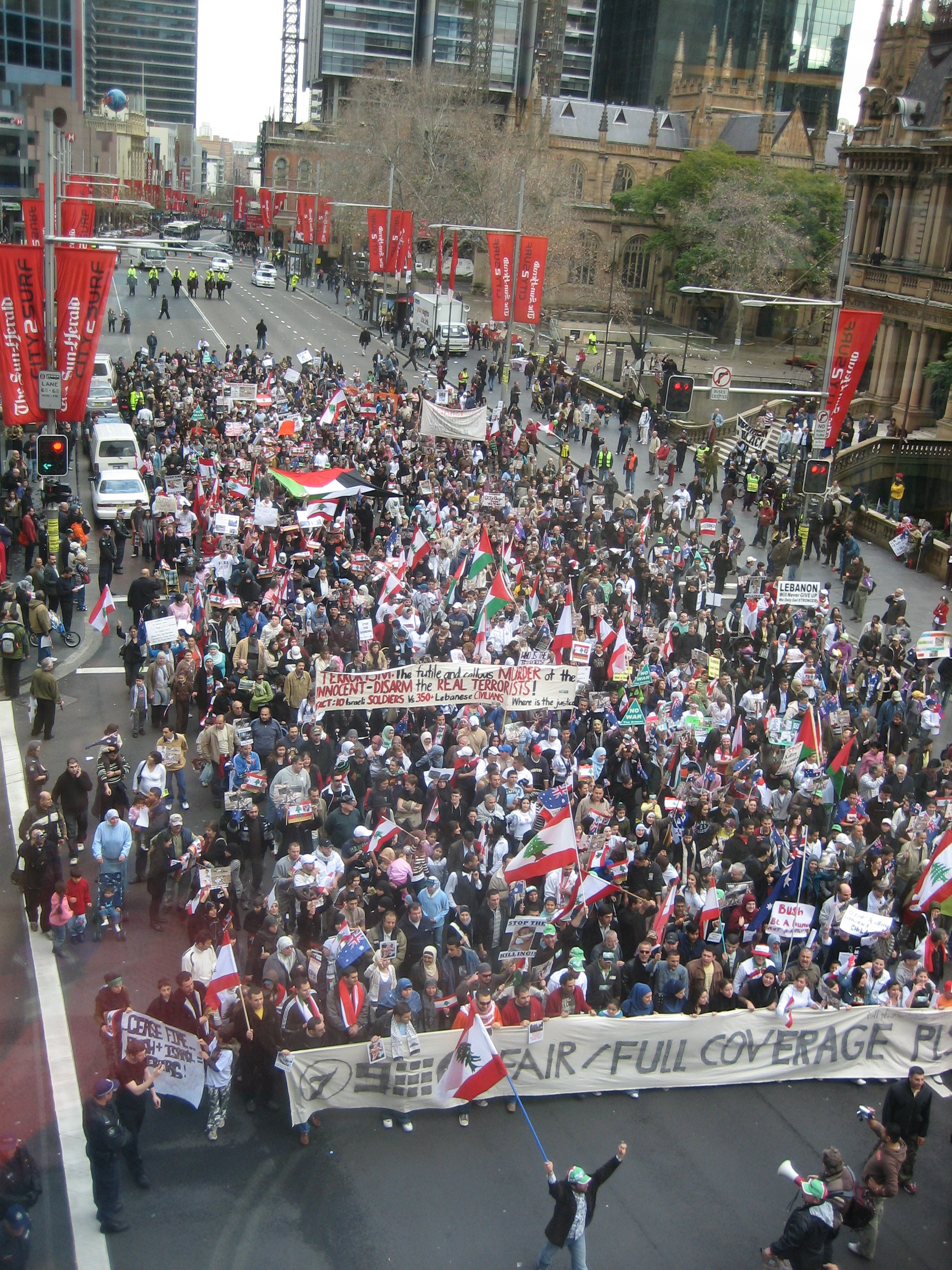
A Lebanese protest in Sydney

The governments of the United States, United Kingdom, Germany, Australia, and Canada asserted Israel's right to self-defense. The United States government further responded by authorizing Israel's request for expedited shipment of precision-guided bombs, but did not announce the decision publicly. United States President George W. Bush said he thought the conflict was part of the "war on terrorism". On 20 July 2006, the United States Congress voted overwhelmingly to support Israel's "right to defend itself".

Among neighboring Middle Eastern nations, Iran, Syria, and Yemen voiced strong support for Hezbollah. AYedioth Ahronoth report claimed Iranian soldiers were fighting in the war itself, with some sources asserting Iranian commander Qasem Soleimani advised Hezbollah for its defense from Israel. The Islamic Courts Union of Somalia was also reported to have fought alongside Hezbollah. On the other hand, the Arab League, Egypt, and Jordan issued statements criticizing Hezbollah's actions and declaring support for Lebanon. Saudi Arabia found Hezbollah entirely responsible. Egypt, Jordan, Kuwait, Iraq, the Palestinian Authority, the United Arab Emirates and Bahrain agreed with the Saudi stance that Hezbollah's actions were "unexpected, inappropriate and irresponsible acts."

Many worldwide protests and demonstrations appealed for an immediate ceasefire on both sides and expressed concern for the heavy loss of civilian life on all sides. Other demonstrations were held exclusively in favor of Lebanon or Israel. Numerous newspaper advertising campaigns, SMS and email appeals, and online petitions also occurred.

Various foreign governments assisted the evacuation of their citizens from Lebanon.

=== Media coverage ===
==== Pro-Israel bias ====
The 2007 report "'War to the Last Moment': The Israeli Media in the Second Lebanon War" by the Israeli media monitoring NGO Keshev (trans. "Awareness") stated that the Israeli media "except for a few exceptional instances ... covered the war in an almost entirely mobilized manner" serving more to support the goals of the Israeli government and IDF than to objectively report the news. "The media created a general atmosphere of complete and absolute support and justification of the war, and systematically suppressed questions that arose as early as the first day of fighting. ... The criticism gradually increased toward the end of the war-as it became clearer that the IDF was not managing to win. But the general spirit of the war coverage, in the broad strategic sense, as utterly uncritical." Keshev's report documents a post-war memo from the Deputy CEO of Marketing for the Hebrew newspaper Maariv to Maariv employees which states, in part, that

Even when we had problematic material related to the management of the war ... we restrained ourselves. In a certain sense, we betrayed our role as journalists, but we did so because we took national, patriotic considerations into account and decided that in the event of war, and certainly a war which was not progressing as it should and was going awry, we were part of the Country; that it was permissible, and even required of us, to postpone disputes and criticism; and that we did not have to apologize, or to feel abashed, for our support and backing of the Army and the Government.

According to the report, "significant coverage of the decision-making process was almost entirely absent in Israel's media" at the beginning of the war and reports on the status of Israelis living in the North who did not receive proper governmental support were marginalized. Further, the report states that the media unreasonably centered on the question of the loyalties of Arab-Israelis in the North instead of focusing on inadequate provision of services by the state. The report acknowledges that the Israeli media reported on Lebanese suffering, But states that it divorced the suffering from the IDF operations causing it. Finally, with regard to diplomacy, Israeli media buried the stories on negotiations to reflect the derision held by decision-makers toward a diplomatic solution.

==== Pro-Hezbollah bias ====
On 18 July 2006 Hezbollah Press Officer Hussein Nabulsi took CNN's Nic Robertson on an exclusive tour of southern Beirut. Robertson noted that despite his minder's anxiety about explosions in the area, it was clear that Hezbollah had sophisticated media relations and were in control of the situation. Hezbollah designated the places that they went to, and the journalists "certainly didn't have time to go into the houses or lift up the rubble to see what was underneath." According to his reports, there was no doubt that the bombs were hitting Hezbollah facilities, and while there appeared to be "a lot of civilian damage, a lot of civilian properties," he reiterated that he could not verify the civilian nature of the destroyed buildings.

Several media commentators and journalists have alleged an intentionally distorted coverage of the events, in favour of Hezbollah, by means of photo manipulation, staging by Hezbollah or by journalists, and false or misleading captioning. For example, CNN's Charlie Moore described a Hezbollah press tour of a bombed-out area in southern Beirut on 23 July 2006 as a "dog-and-pony show" due to perceived staging, misrepresentation of the nature of the destroyed areas, and strict directives about when and with whom interviews could take place. In the same interview CNN's John Roberts, reporting from an Israeli artillery battery on the Lebanese border, stated that he had to take everything he was told—either by the IDF or Hezbollah—"with a grain of salt," citing mutual recriminations of civilian targeting which he was unable to verify independently. As another example, Reuters withdrew over 900 photographs by Adnan Hajj, a Lebanese freelance photographer, after he admitted to digitally adding and darkening smoke spirals in photographs of an attack on Beirut. Photographs submitted to Reuters and Associated Press showed one Lebanese woman mourning on two different pictures taken by two photographers, allegedly taken two weeks apart. It is "common practice to send more than one photographer to an incident".

Social and online media were important for providing alternate means of creating and disseminating accounts and political commentary. For example, Lebanese blogger Fink Ployd maintained the blog BloggingBeirut.com, posting images, audio files, and testimony from Lebanon, particularly from Lebanese Arab youth.

Swedish politician Lars Adaktusson, who worked as a journalist in Israel for national news outlet Sveriges Television (SVT) at the time of the war, stated in a 2017 presentation that he was ordered by SVT management to report that armed hostilities had been started by Israel irrespective of the facts. Also he was ordered not to report Hizbollah rocket attacks on Israeli civilians.

== Analyses ==
Following the UN-brokered ceasefire, there were mixed responses on who had gained or lost the most in the war. Iran and Syria proclaimed a victory for Hezbollah while Olmert declared that the war was a success for Israel.

=== Lebanon ===
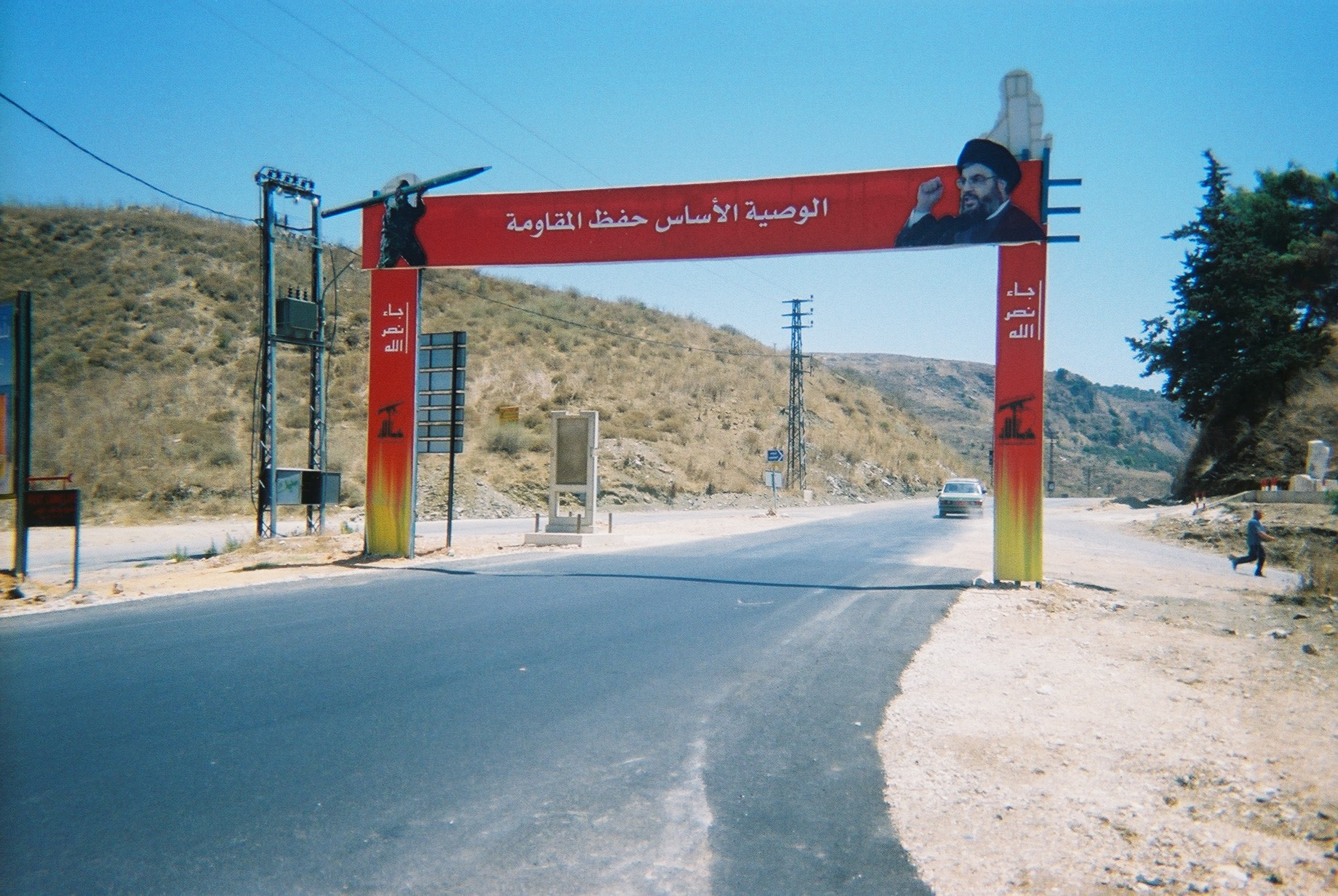
A sign erected after the 2006 Lebanon War in South Lebanon which displays rockets and Hezbollah leader Hassan Nasrallah

At the outbreak of hostilities, Prime Minister Fouad Siniora promised to rein in Hezbollah in an effort to stop Israel's offensive. Saniora said that there could be no sovereign state of Lebanon without the group's disarming. The former President of Lebanon Amin Gemayel, a longtime critic of Hezbollah said, "Hezbollah took a unilateral action, but its repercussions will affect the entire country." The war deepened the longtime divide in Lebanon over Hezbollah's role. Many admired the organization for being the sole group to fight against Israel. Others considered it to be a dangerous militia that executes Iran and Syria policies in Lebanon. The divide over Hezbollah followed mostly sectarian lines, with Shias largely supporting the group and Sunnis, Christians and Druze mostly opposing it.

On 27 August 2006, Nasrallah said in an interview with New TV that the abduction of the two soldiers did not cause the war. It only advanced a long planned war for a few months. But he added: "If there was even a 1 percent chance that the July 11 capturing operation would have led to a war like the one that happened, would you have done it? I would say no, absolutely not, for humanitarian, moral, social, security, military, and political reasons. [...] What happened is not an issue of a reaction to a capturing operation... what happened was already planned for. The fact that it happened in July has averted a situation that would have been a lot worse, had the war been launched in October."

On 22 September 2006, some eight hundred thousand Hezbollah supporters gathered in Beirut for a rally at which Nasrallah stated that Hezbollah had achieved a "divine and strategic victory."

=== Israel ===
Within hours of Israeli's bombing of Lebanon on 13 July 2006, hundreds of protesters gathered in Tel Aviv to oppose the war. On 22 July, about 2,000 people, including many Arab citizens of Israel, demanded an end to the offensive during a protest march in Tel Aviv's Rabin Square. On 5 August, some Israelis demonstrated in Tel Aviv, including former Knesset members of the Meretz party, Mossi Raz, Naomi Hazan and Yael Dayan.

Initially, in a poll by an Israeli radio station, Israelis were split on the outcome with the majority believing that no one won. By 25 August 63% of Israelis polled wanted Olmert to resign due to his handling of the war. In a 2012 opinion piece in The Jerusalem Post, Caroline Glick wrote that "if you fail to win, you lose" and that as "Hezbollah survived, it won the war."

Olmert admitted to the Knesset that there were mistakes in the war in Lebanon, though he framed UN Security Council resolution 1701 as an accomplishment for Israel that would bring home the captured soldiers, and said that the operations had altered the regional strategic balance vis-à-vis Hezbollah. The Israeli Chief of Staff Dan Halutz admitted to failings in the conflict. On 15 August, Israeli government and defense officials called for Halutz's resignation following a stock scandal in which he admitted selling stocks hours before the start of the Israeli offensive. Halutz subsequently resigned on 17 January 2007.

On 21 August, a group of demobilized Israel reserve soldiers and parents of soldiers killed in the fighting started a movement calling for the resignation of Olmert and the establishment of a state commission of inquiry. They set up a protest tent opposite the Knesset and grew to over 2,000 supporters by 25 August, including the influential Movement for Quality Government. On 28 August, Olmert announced that there would be no independent state or governmental commission of inquiry, but two internal inspection probes, one to investigate the political echelon and one to examine the IDF, and likely a third commission to examine the Home Front, to be announced at a later date. These would have a more limited mandate and less authority than a single inquiry commission headed by a retired judge. The political and military committees were to be headed by former director of Mossad Nahum Admoni and former chief of staff Amnon Lipkin-Shahak, respectively. Critics argued that these committees amount to a whitewash, due to their limited authority, limited investigatory scope, their self-appointed basis, and that neither would be headed by a retired judge.

Due to these pressures, on 11 October, Admoni was replaced by retired justice Eliyahu Winograd as chair of the political probe, and the probe itself was elevated to the status of governmental commission with near-state commission mandate: the Winograd Commission. On 12 September, former defense minister Moshe Arens spoke of "the defeat of Israel" in calling for a state committee of inquiry. He said that Israel had lost "to a very small group of people, 5,000 Hezbollah fighters, which should have been no match at all for the IDF", and stated that the conflict could have "some very fateful consequences for the future." Disclosing his intent to shortly resign, Ilan Harari, the IDF's chief education officer, stated at a conference of senior IDF officers that Israel lost the war, becoming the first senior active duty officer to publicly state such an opinion. IDF Major General Yiftah Ron Tal, on 4 October 2006 became the second and highest ranking serving officer to express his opinion that the IDF failed "to win the day in the battle against Hezbollah" as well as calling for Lt. Gen. Dan Halutz's resignation. Ron-Tal was subsequently fired for making those and other critical comments.

In March 2007, the Committee decided to name the war the "Second Lebanon War", a decision that was subsequently approved by the Israeli cabinet.

In 2008, Ehud Barak, the replacement defense minister for Peretz, stated that the conflict failed to disarm Hezbollah, and that the group is increasingly entrenched in South Lebanon, further stating that "Hezbollah is stronger than ever and has more rockets than at the outbreak of the Lebanon war in the summer of 2006" but he later noted that "[Israeli] deterrence still exists." The IDF's Northern Command cited this deterrence as one reason Hezbollah did not fire any rockets into Israel during Operation Cast Lead.

Israeli military historian Martin van Creveld stated that Israel's war against Hezbollah was indeed "marked by a long series of failures" but he criticized the Winograd Commission for its failure to take into account the substantial achievements of the war. He noted that hundreds of Hezbollah fighters were killed in the war, and that the organization had "the fight knocked out of it", since following the war, Israel experienced a level of calm on its Lebanon border not seen since the mid-1960s. He also noted that Hezbollah was "thrown out of South Lebanon", and was replaced by "a fairly robust United Nations peacekeeping force" to prevent its return.

IDF Maj.-Gen. (res.) Yaakov Amidror highlighted the number of Hezbollah militants killed, the quick military response to Hezbollah's long-range rocket attacks, the post-war replacement of Hezbollah by the Lebanese Army and UNIFIL in southern Lebanon, and Iran's loss of Hezbollah as a deterrent against an Israeli first strike following the war. Thomas Friedman concurred, stating that the war was a "huge strategic loss for Hezbollah", and contrasted the billions in damage suffered by Hezbollah and Lebanon with the "relatively minor damage" suffered by Israel, which enjoyed an economic "growth spurt" immediately following the war.

Some Israeli sources stated that due to unprecedented Iranian military support to Hezbollah before and during the war, some consider it the first round of the Iran–Israel proxy conflict, rather than a continuation of the Arab–Israeli conflict.

==== Winograd Commission report ====
According to the Winograd Commission report, the Second Lebanon War was regarded as a "missed opportunity" and that "Israel initiated a long war, which ended without a defined military victory". The report continued to state that "a semi-military organization of a few thousand men resisted, for a few weeks, the strongest army in the Middle East, which enjoyed full air superiority and size and technology advantages." Furthermore, Hezbollah's rocket attacks continued throughout the war and the IDF did not provide an effective response to it. Following a long period of using standoff firepower and limited ground activities, the IDF launched a large-scale ground offensive close to the UN Security Council's resolution which imposed a ceasefire. "This offensive did not result in military gains and was not completed."

Later in the Report, the Commission stated that "[a] decision [was] made in the night of 12 July to react (to the capturing) with immediate and substantive military action and to set ... ambitious goals." This decision had immediate repercussions in that subsequent decisions were limited mainly to a choice between a) "a short, painful and unexpected blow on Hezbollah" and b) "to bring about a significant change of the reality in the South of Lebanon with a large ground operation,[occupying]... the South of Lebanon and 'cleaning' it of Hezbollah." "The fact Israel went to war before it decided which option to select and without an exit strategy, all these constituted serious failures of the decision making process." As for achievements, the Commission reported that "SC resolution 1701, and the fact that it was adopted unanimously, were an achievement for Israel."

=== International ===
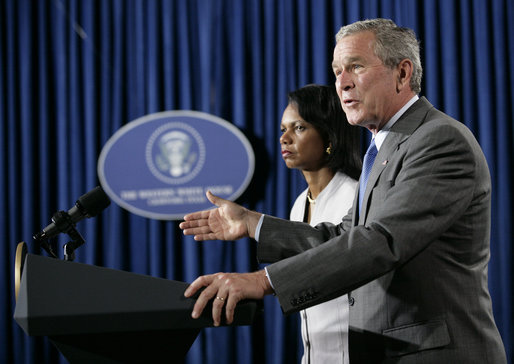
George W. Bush declared that Hezbollah lost the war and that "There's going to be a new power in the south of Lebanon".

In the aftermath of the conflict US President George Bush said that Hezbollah was responsible for starting the war, and that the group suffered a defeat at the hands of Israel. He dismissed claims of victory by Hezbollah leaders, asking: "how can you claim victory when at one time you were a state within a state, safe within southern Lebanon, and now you're going to be replaced by a Lebanese Army and an international force?" In his 2010 memoir, Decision Points, Bush wrote that Israel had weakened Hezbollah and secured its northern border, but that Israel's "shaky military performance" cost it international credibility. He also said that Israel "mishandled its opportunity", and that some of the sites it attacked were of "questionable military value".

In a speech given on 15 August 2006, Syrian President Bashar al-Assad claimed that the Arab resistance against Israel would continue to grow stronger, saying, "Your weapons, warplanes, rockets and even your atomic bomb will not protect you in the future."

The Economist magazine concluded that by surviving this asymmetrical military conflict with Israel, Hezbollah effectively emerged with a military and political victory from this conflict. They cite the facts that Hezbollah was able to sustain defenses on Lebanese soil and inflict unmitigated rocket attacks on Israeli civilians in the face of a punishing air and land campaign by the IDF.

Matt M. Matthews, a military historian at the Combat Studies Institute of the US Army Command and General Staff College praised Hezbollah paramilitaries and reflected on what he described as "the lackluster performance of the IDF." He attributed this to several factors including (Lieutenant-General and Chief of the IDF General Staff) Halutz's steadfast confidence in air power coupled with continuing COIN operations against the Palestinians at the expense of training for major combat operations.

The US Congressional Research Service found that although Hezbollah's military capabilities may have been substantially reduced, its long-term potential as a guerrilla movement appeared to remain intact: "Observers note that Hezbollah's leaders have been able to claim a level of 'victory' simply by virtue of not having decisively 'lost'."

Military analyst and former IDF general Giora Eiland concluded that, though outgunned and outnumbered, Hezbollah managed to hold off Israel's advanced armed forces and proved its ability to damage Israel by launching rockets at its territory until the end of the war. He estimates that Hezbollah's destructive capabilities have increased in the years after the war and that the group is capable to inflict "far worse damage on the Israeli homefront" than in 2006. An Israeli official warned that combat with Hezbollah will be very bloody and Lebanon would sustain heavy damage in any future war.

In the 2007 BBC documentary, Hunting for Hezbollah, BBC This World reporter Emeka Onono referred to Israel's inability to eliminate Hezbollah as a "humiliation for Israel's supposedly all-powerful army," and he went on to claim that Hezbollah's survival propelled it to hero status throughout many Muslim nations.

British military historian John Keegan stated that the outcome of the war was "misreported as an Israeli defeat" due to anti-Israel bias in the international media. He concluded that Hezbollah had suffered heavy losses, and that a ceasefire came into effect before Israel could completely dislodge Hezbollah from its positions. He also stated that the casualties sustained by Israel during the war had alarmed the Israeli Government and High Command because Israel's small population is acutely vulnerable to losses in battle.

Charles Krauthammer, a syndicated columnist and political commentator, citing an interview by which Nasrallah admitted that he would not have captured the soldiers had he known that it would lead to war, wrote, "Nasrallah's admission, vastly underplayed in the West, makes clear what Lebanese already knew. Hezbollah may have won the propaganda war, but on the ground it lost. Badly." He noted that Hezbollah's entrenched infrastructure along Israel's border was shattered and would not be easily rebuilt due to the presence of the Lebanese Army and a robust UNIFIL force, hundreds of Hezbollah's best fighters were killed in the war, and that many Lebanese were angry with Hezbollah for provoking a war which largely devastated the country.

The Washington Post stated that the war had been "widely seen as a disaster for the Israeli military". It further reported that the US Defense Department had sent as many as a dozen teams to interview Israeli officers who had fought in the war, to learn the lessons of the Israeli army's failures during the conflict.

Michael Young, opinion-page editor at the Lebanese Daily Star newspaper, stated that Hezbollah turned "the stench of defeat into the smell of victory", through clever use of its propaganda machine. He suggested that Hezbollah had "hoodwinked" pundits who believed that Hezbollah was victorious, and opined that "one dreads to imagine what Hezbollah would recognize as a military loss."

American military strategist and historian Edward Luttwak drew comparisons with the 1973 Yom Kippur War, where what initially looked like an Israeli setback later turned out to be an IDF victory and an Arab defeat. He stated that although some IDF tanks were penetrated by missiles, they also largely limited IDF casualties, and that Hezbollah had failed to inflict massive losses on the IDF and to kill large numbers of Israelis in rocket attacks. Cambridge professor and Peterhouse Fellow Brendan Simms summed up the war this way; "Hezbollah have suffered a setback (but are too clever to admit it) and the Israelis have scored a long-term success (but are too narrow-minded to realize it)."

Journalist Michael Totten wrote that "Hezbollah lost and Hezbollah knows it." He questioned why Hezbollah did not attack Israel when the IDF attacked Hamas in Gaza in 2008, and noted that most of Nasrallah's supporters "want Hezbollah to deter Israeli invasions, not to invite Israeli invasions". Totten concluded that Nasrallah's boasts "play well in much of the Arab world", but that the 2006 "victory" seemed "empty at home."

Armin Rosen, Defense and military advisor wrote at Business Insider that the 2006 Lebanon War was "widely remembered as one of the worst debacles in the history of the Israeli military", but remarked that it established Israeli deterrence against Hezbollah.

=== Financial and political repercussions ===
The fighting resulted in a huge financial setback for Lebanon, with an official estimate of a fall in growth from +6% to 2% and US$5 billion (22% of GDP) in direct and indirect costs, while the cost for Israel was estimated at US$3.5 billion. Indirect costs to Israel include a cut in growth by 0.9%. and the cost to tourism was estimated at 0.4% of Israel's GDP in the following year. According to Imad Salamey in The Government and Politics of Lebanon, the main casualty was the fragile unity between Lebanon's sectarian and political groups.

== Aftermath ==
=== Post-ceasefire events ===
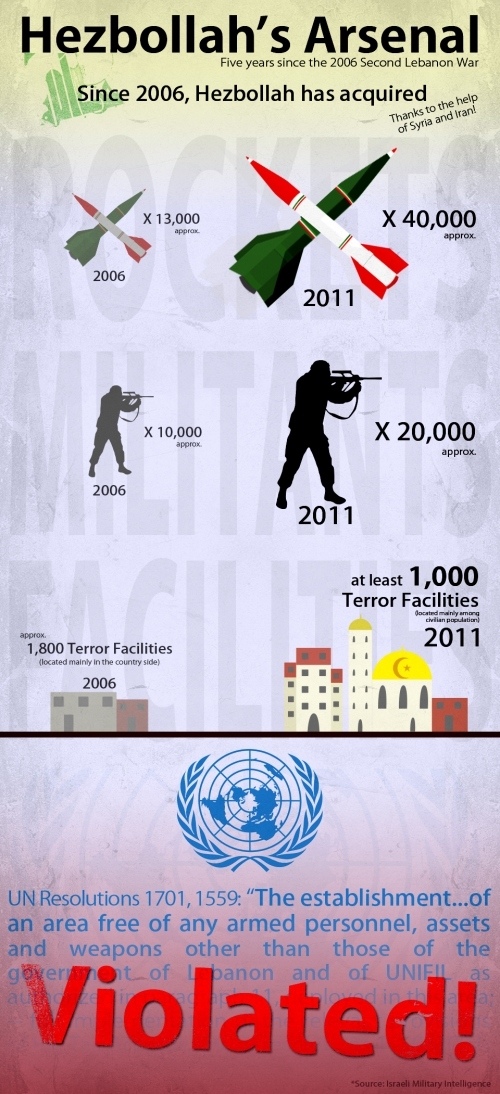
An infographic produced by the Israel Defence Force criticizing Hezbollah's violations of United Nations Security Council Resolution 1701. The resolution calls for Hezbollah to remain disarmed and bans paramilitary activity south of the Litani River.

In the days following 14 August 2006 ceasefire, Hezbollah launched dozens of rockets and mortars inside southern Lebanon, which Israel did not respond to, though there were several instances where Israeli troops killed armed Hezbollah members approaching their positions. Israeli warplanes continued conducting numerous flyovers and maneuvers above southern Lebanon, which Israel said did not violate the ceasefire. On 19 August 2006, Israel launched a raid in Lebanon's eastern Beqaa Valley it says was aimed at disrupting Hezbollah's weapons supply from Syria and Iran. Lebanese officials "said the Israelis were apparently seeking a guerrilla target in a school." Israel's aerial and commando operations were criticized by UN Secretary-General Kofi Annan as violations of the ceasefire, which he said they had conducted the majority of, and he also protested the continued embargo. France, then leading UNIFIL, also issued criticism of the flyovers, which it interpreted as aggressive. Israel argued that "[t]he ceasefire is based on (UN resolution) 1701 which calls for an international arms embargo against Hezbollah," and said the embargo could be lifted after full implementation of the ceasefire but Annan said that UNIFIL would only interdict arms at Lebanon's request. On 7 September 2006 and 8 September 2006, respectively, aviation and naval blockades were lifted. In the second half of September Hezbollah claimed victory and asserted an improvement in their position, and they redeployed to some positions on the border as Israel completed its withdrawal from Lebanon save border-straddling Ghajar. On 3 October, an Israeli fighter penetrated the two-nautical-mile (4 km) defence perimeter of the French frigate Courbet without answering radio calls, triggering a diplomatic incident.

On 24 October, six Israeli F-16s flew over a German Navy vessel patrolling off Israel's coast just south of the Lebanese border. The German Defence Ministry said that the planes had given off infrared decoys and one of the aircraft had fired two shots into the air, which had not been specifically aimed. The Israeli military said that a German helicopter took off from the vessel without having coordinated this with Israel, and denied vehemently having fired any shots at the vessel and said "as of now" it also had no knowledge of the jets launching flares over it. Israeli Defence Minister Amir Peretz telephoned his German counterpart Franz Josef Jung to clarify that 'Israel has no intention to carry out any aggressive actions' against the German peacekeeping forces in Lebanon, who are there as part of UNIFIL to enforce an arms embargo against Hezbollah. Germany confirmed the consultations, and that both sides were interested in maintaining good cooperation.

On 1 December 2006, UN Secretary-General Kofi Annan submitted a report to the Security Council president maintaining "there were no serious incidents or confrontations" since the ceasefire in August 2006. He did, however, note that peacekeepers reported air violations by Israel "almost on a daily basis," which Israel maintained were a security measure related to continuing Syrian and Iranian arms shipments to Hezbollah, and evidence of the presence of unauthorized armed personnel, assets, and weapons in Lebanon. In one case, a UNIFIL demining team was challenged by two Hezbollah members in combat uniforms armed with AK-47 rifles; UNIFIL notified the Lebanese army, who arrested three suspects the next day. There were also "13 instances where UNIFIL came across unauthorized arms or related material in its area of operation", including the discovery of 17 katyusha rockets and several improvised explosive devices in Rachaiya El-Foukhar, and the discovery of a weapons cache containing seven missiles, three rocket launchers, and a substantial amount of ammunition in the area of Bourhoz. Annan also reported that as of 20 November 2006, 822 Israeli cluster bomb strike sites had been recorded, with 60,000 cluster bomblets having been cleared by the UN Mine Action Coordination Center.

The months after the hostilities saw major upheaval in the Israeli military and political echelon, with the spate of high-ranking resignations including Chief of General Staff Dan Halutz, and calls for resignations of many cabinet-members including Prime-Minister Ehud Olmert following publication of the Winograd Commission's findings. The Winograd report severely criticized Olmert, accusing him of a "severe failure in exercising judgment, responsibility and caution." Lebanese Prime Minister Fouad Siniora criticized the Winograd report for failing to report on the full destruction dealt to Lebanon by the brief July War of 2006.

After the war, the Lebanese Army deployed 15,000 soldiers, backed by a UNIFIL force of 12,000, deployed South of the Litani River to replace Hezbollah, although the Lebanese government said that it cannot and will not disarm Hezbollah by force. On 7 February 2010, the Lebanese Army fired at an Israeli bulldozer on the border, and Israeli forces returned fire. There were no reported casualties. Lebanon claimed that the bulldozer had crossed the border and entered Lebanese territory. On 21 February 2007, Lebanese Army troops fired at an Israeli UAV over Tyre with small arms, causing no damage.

On 30 June 2007, UN Secretary-General Ban Ki-moon's fourth report on the implementation of Security Council Resolution 1701 fingered Israel, Lebanon and Hezbollah for violating the ceasefire, but called the firing of rockets into Israel by unknown elements "the most serious breach of the cessation of hostilities since the end of the war." The report commended Israel on its restraint following this attack, and commended Lebanon for its continued efforts to disarm armed groups. It further stated that in spite of "flexibility by Israel beyond the framework of UNSC-Resolution 1701, implementation of the resolution's humanitarian aspects has not yet been possible."

On 12 February 2008, Imad Mugniyah, the head of Hezbollah's military wing, was assassinated by a car bomb in Damascus. The Mossad, Israel's intelligence agency, was widely believed to be behind the assassination. Although Israel officially denied involvement, Mugniyah had been the target of previous Mossad assassination attempts. Israel considered Mugniyah a "significant force behind actions against Israel".

On 14 July 2009, an explosion in Khirbat Silim, a Lebanese village near the Lebanon-Israel border, killed eight Hezbollah militants. Israel and the United Nations stated that the explosion was a hidden Hezbollah weapons cache, and condemned Hezbollah for violating Resolution 1701. The Lebanese government stated that the explosion was caused by IDF munitions left following the 2006 war. Hezbollah blamed the explosion on leftover shells that had been collected following Israel's withdrawal from Lebanon in 2000. A Kuwaiti newspaper, al-Seyassah, reported that the ammunition warehouse stored chemical weapons.

On 23 August 2009, the IDF published a video it said showed villagers from Marwakhin, a village in southern Lebanon, "forcefully resisting" efforts by Hezbollah militants to store weapons in their village.

On 4 November 2009 Israeli navy commandos of Shayetet 13 boarded the ship MV Francop in the eastern Mediterranean Sea and seized 500 tons of Iranian armaments disguised as civilian cargo. Israel said the weapons were bound for Hezbollah and originated from Iran. Hezbollah disavowed any connection to the contraband and accused Israel of "piracy."

According to Lebanese Army in May 2010 it fired anti-aircraft artillery at two Israeli jets over Lebanon.

In 2010, French UNIFIL forces warned that they could in the future attack Israeli jets with anti-aircraft batteries if Israel continued its overflights of Lebanese airspace.

On 4 August 2010, a clash on the border occurred when the Israel military tried to remove a tree from between the border and the border fence on Israeli territory. According to the Israelis, the tree was blocking the view of one of their video cameras at the border. The Lebanese army fired at the Israeli forces and there was a clash for a few hours. In the ensuing clash, one Israeli soldier died as well as two Lebanese soldiers and one Lebanese journalist. There were also a number of injured military soldiers and civilians on both sides including Lebanese journalists.

=== Prisoner swap ===
On Wednesday 16 July 2008, in accordance with the mandates of Resolution 1701, Hezbollah transferred the coffins of captured Israeli soldiers, Ehud Goldwasser and Eldad Regev, in exchange for incarcerated Palestinian Liberation Front militant Samir Kuntar, four Hezbollah militants captured by Israel during the war, and bodies of about 200 other Lebanese and Palestinian militants held by Israel. Until that time, Hezbollah had provided no information on Goldwasser and Regev's condition and disallowed the Red Cross from visiting them.

=== In film ===
The 2006 Lebanon War is the subject of two feature length films, both of which were screened at the 2008 Sundance Film Festival. They are Philippe Aractingi's Under the Bombs (2007) and Guy Nattiv and Erez Tadmor's Strangers (2007). Israeli soldier and documentary filmmaker Yariv Mozer also wrote, directed and filmed the autobiographical "My First War" based on his experiences in the conflict. The conflict was also the subject of an episode of Anthony Bourdain: No Reservations, which was nominated for an Emmy Award for Outstanding Informational Programming in 2007.

A collective of Lebanese filmmakers produced during and in the immediate aftermath of the war some twenty short videos that were released as Videos Under Siege and presented in numerous festivals including the Dubai International Film Festival. The directors involved included Akram Zaatari, Khalil Joreige, Joana Hadjithomas, Danielle Arbid, Tina Baz, Gregory Buchakjian, Ghassan Salhab, Rania Stephan and others.

== See also ==
- List of extrajudicial killings and political violence in Lebanon
- List of invasions in the 21st century
- 2006 in Israel
- List of modern conflicts in the Middle East
- List of proxy wars
- List of rocket attacks from Lebanon on Israel
- List of wars involving Israel
- List of wars involving Lebanon
- List of wars: 2003–present
- Operation Accountability
- Operation Grapes of Wrath
- Timeline of the Arab–Israeli conflict
- United Nations Security Council Resolution 1697
- 2026 Lebanon war

== Sources ==
- Cordesman, Anthony H.; Sullivan, George; Sullivan, William D. (2007). Lessons of the 2006 Israeli–Hezbollah War. Washington: CSIS.
- Cambanis, Thanassis, A Privilege to Die: Inside Hezbollah's Legions and Their Endless War Against Israel, Free Press, New York, 2010
- Crooke, Alastair and Mark Perry, "How Hezbollah Defeated Israel", Asia Times

PART 1: Winning the intelligence war, 12 October 2006
PART 2: Winning the ground war, 13 October 2006
PART 3: The political war, 14 October 2006

- Ehrlich, Dr. Reuven (Col. Ret.), "Hezbollah's use of Lebanese civilians as human shields", Intelligence and Terrorism Information Center at the Center for Special Studies (C.S.S), November 2006. [The study was supported by Military Intelligence, the Operations Division of the IDF General Staff, the IDF Spokesperson and the legal experts of the IDF and the Ministry of Foreign Affairs.]
- Harel, Amos; Issacharoff, Avi (2008). 34 Days: Israel, Hezbollah, and the War in Lebanon. New York: Palgrave Macmillan.
- Why They Died: Civilian Casualties in Lebanon During the 2006 War. Human Rights Watch. 2007.
- Human Rights Watch (28 August 2007). Civilians under Assault: Hezbollah’s Rocket Attacks on Israel in the 2006 War. Human Rights Watch (Report). Vol. 19.
- Kober, Avi (2008). "The Israel Defense Forces in the Second Lebanon War: Why the Poor Performance?". The Journal of Strategic Studies. 31 (1): 3–40. doi:10.1080/01402390701785211.
- Marcus, Raphael D. Israel's Long War with Hezbollah: Military Innovation and Adaptation under Fire (Georgetown UP, 2018) online review
- Matthews, Matt M. (2006). We Were Caught Unprepared: The 2006 Hezbollah-Israeli War. The Long War Series Occasional Paper 26, U.S. Army Combined Arms Center Combat Studies Institute Press Fort Leavenworth, Kansas. Archived from the original on 30 December 2021.
- Rapaport, Amir, "The IDF and the Lessons of the Second Lebanon War", Mideast Security and Policy Studies No. 85, The Begin-Sadat Center for Strategic Studies, Bar-Ilan University, Ramat Gan, 2010
- "The final Winograd Commission report (Hebrew)" (PDF). Archived from the original (PDF) on 30 August 2012.
- Lubotzky, Asael, From the Wilderness and Lebanon, Koren Publishers Jerusalem, 2016
