= Operation Density =

July 2006 Israeli airstrikes on Lebanon

- Part of 2006 Lebanon War
Date	July 13, 2006
Location	Lebanon
Result	Israeli success

Belligerents
Israel	Hezbollah

Commanders and leaders
(Israel) Dan Halutz Chief of staff; (Israel) Gadi Eizenkot Head of Operations Directorate; (Israel) Eliezer Shkedi Chief of the Israeli Air Force	(Hezbollah) Hassan Nasrallah

Strength
Israeli Air Force	Hezbollah Rocket Array

Casualties and losses
None	59 missile launchers and large numbers of long-range missiles destroyed (Israeli claim)
- 20 Lebanese civilians killed

Operation Density (or "Operation Specific Weight", Hebrew: מבצע משקל סגולי), also known as "The Fajr Night", was a military operation conducted by the Israeli Air Force on the second day of the 2006 Lebanon War. In the operation, official Israeli military sources claim that the majority of Hezbollah’s long-range rockets were destroyed in air strikes that lasted 34 minutes. Other sources question whether the attack had any apparent effect on Hezbollah's capabilities.

== Background ==
The 2006 Lebanon War began when Hezbollah captured two Israeli soldiers. As a result of this, a forum was gathered in the Israeli army HQ in Tel Aviv, about the possible responses to the attack. One suggestion was the launch of "Operation Density", an air strike with the purpose of destroying the long-range rocket capability of Hezbollah. After a long discussion, the Israeli cabinet approved the operation.

== The operation ==
In the early hours of July 13, a series of Israeli airstrikes targeted dozens of stationary missile launchers concealed in the homes of Hezbollah activists and Shiite families throughout Lebanon. The IDF claimed to have hit 59 missile launchers. A large number of Hezbollah's Iranian-made long-range rockets were claimed to have been destroyed, with estimates ranging from one-half to two-thirds.

"All the long-range rockets have been destroyed," Chief of Staff Halutz allegedly told the Israeli government on the second day of the war, "we've won the war."

Some sources agree that the operation was a success. According to Israeli journalists Amos Harel and Avi Issacharoff the operation was Israel's most impressive military achievement during the war and a "devastating blow for Hezbollah". Harel and Issacharoff claimed that the operation was a success due to the painstaking work carried out by Israeli intelligence. It also took Hezbollah completely by surprise, as it had believed that the location of its long-range missiles was a safely guarded secret.

US military analyst William Arkin acknowledged that two experienced American observers noted that the Israeli Air Force had devastated Hezbollah's missile stocks in 39 minutes, but wrote that there was "little evidence" that the Israeli Air Force even attempted, much less succeeded in, wiping out the medium and long-range rocket capability in the first days of the war. While he acknowledged that some sort of preplanned Israeli attack took place, he dismissed the claim as an "absurdity" and a "tale". Another US analyst, Benjamin Lambeth, however, insisted that it was far-fetched to suggest that the "authoritative Israeli leadership pronouncements" were not based on facts. He admitted however that there was "persistent uncertainty" surrounding the "few known facts and figures" concerning the attacks. Anthony Cordesman believed that the IAF probably destroyed most long and medium-range missiles in the first two days of the war but acknowledged that these claims "have never been validated or described in detail."

In 2024, The Washington Post quoted Oded Eilam, a former senior officer in the Mossad, as stating that the IDF destroyed 75 long-range missile launchers in 34 minutes, representing two-thirds of Hezbollah's long-range missile capabilities.

Hezbollah long remained silent on this episode of the war. On the sixth anniversary of the Lebanon war Hezbollah chairman Hassan Nasrallah claimed that Hezbollah had known that the Israelis were collecting information on the rocket platforms and launchers and managed to move them without being detected. Most of the locations attacked by the Israeli air force were therefore empty.

== Sources ==
- Arkin, William M. (July 2007). "Divining Victory: Airpower in the 2006 Israel-Hezbollah War" (PDF). Maxwell Air Force Base, Alabama: Air University Press.
- Cordesman, Anthony H.; George Sullivan and William D. Sullivan (2007). Lessons of the 2006 Israeli-Hezbollah War. Washington: CSIS.
- Cambanis, Thanassis, A Privilege to Die: Inside Hezbollah's Legions and Their Endless War Against Israel, Free Press, New York, 2010
- Harel, Amos; Issacharoff, Avi (2008). 34 Days: Israel, Hezbollah, and the War in Lebanon. New York: Palgrave Macmillan.
- Lilach Gonen (July 13, 2012), Opening Strike
- Dudi (David) Yaron (August 3, 2014), Israel’s Air Force: From the Second Lebanon War to Protective Edge
