= List of Arab–Israeli prisoner exchanges =

Israeli prisoner exchanges are exchanges of prisoners during the Arab–Israeli conflict. Israel has exchanged POWs with its Arab neighbors, and various militant organizations.

== List of prisoner exchanges ==
=== 1940s and 1950s ===
The first exchanges took place after the 1948 Arab–Israeli War, when Israel exchanged all its Palestinian prisoners and POWs from Arab armies in exchange for all Israeli soldiers and civilians taken captive during the war.

On December 8, 1954, a five-man Israel Defense Forces (IDF) patrol operating on the Syrian border was abducted and tortured by the Syrian Army. One of the soldiers, Uri Ilan, committed suicide while in captivity after being falsely informed by his captors that his fellow soldiers had been killed. The four surviving POWs and Ilan's body were returned on March 29, 1956, in exchange for 40 Syrian soldiers captured during various Israeli military operations.

Following the 1956 Suez Crisis, Israel exchanged 5,500 Egyptian prisoners captured during the campaign and 77 others who were captured during military operations from before the war, in exchange for an Israeli pilot taken prisoner during the war, and three soldiers taken captive in pre-war attacks.

=== 1960s ===
On February 21, 1962, Syria exchanged the body of an Israeli soldier it was holding for a Syrian soldier in Israeli captivity.

On December 21, 1963, 11 Israeli soldiers and civilians captured by Syria throughout the years since Israel's independence were exchanged for 18 Syrian prisoners in Israel.

During the 1967 Six-Day War, Israel took 4,338 Egyptian soldiers and 899 civilians, 553 Jordanian soldiers and 366 civilians, and 367 Syrian soldiers and 205 civilians captive, while 15 Israeli soldiers and the bodies of two more fell into Arab captivity. All of them were released following the war. Israeli spies imprisoned in Egypt since the 1950s, two Israeli naval commanders captured shortly after the war, and the body of an Israeli soldier who was abducted a year before the war and subsequently died in prison were also released.

On April 2, 1968, 12 Jordanian soldiers taken prisoner during the Battle of Karameh were released in exchange for the body of a missing Israeli soldier. The Jordanians were supposed to have returned two more bodies, but the coffins were found to contain only dirt, and the soldiers are still considered missing.

In July, 1968 an El-Al airliner was hijacked to Algeria. The twelve Israeli crewmen and passengers were exchanged for 16 Palestinian prisoners in Israeli jails. The Israeli government later denied that there had been a deal.

On December 7, 1969, two Israeli citizens whose plane was hijacked to Damascus, and two Israeli pilots, Giora Rom and Nissim Ashkenazi who were shot down over the Suez Canal in the War of Attrition, were exchanged for 71 Egyptian and Syrian prisoners held in Israel.

=== 1970s ===
On January 1, 1970, a night watchman in Metulla, Shmuel Rosenwasser, was abducted by Fatah. More than a year later Rosenwasser was freed in exchange for Mahmoud Hijazi, a Fatah prisoner in Israel. Hijazi was wounded and captured in Fatah's first military attack on Israel, January 1, 1965, and sentenced to 30 years in prison.

On June 9, 1972, an IDF force captured 5 Syrian officers patrolling near the Israel-Lebanon border, and they were exchanged for 3 Israeli pilots in Syrian captivity.

On June 3, 1973, 3 Israeli Air Force pilots in Syrian captivity for three years were exchanged for 46 Syrian prisoners.

During the October 1973 Yom Kippur War, Egypt and Syria took 293 Israeli prisoners, while Israel captured 8,372 Egyptians, 392 Syrians, 13 Iraqis, and 6 Moroccans. All these prisoners were exchanged during November 15–22, 1973. During the exchange, both sides also swapped prisoners from the War of Attrition.

On April 4, 1975, Egypt returned the bodies of 39 IDF soldiers killed during the Yom Kippur War in exchange for 92 terrorists and security prisoners held in Israel.

In June 1975, Israel released 20 prisoners from the Gaza Strip and Sinai Peninsula. In exchange, Egypt gave Israel the bodies of Eliyahu Hakim and Eliyahu Bet-Zuri, two Jewish fighters of the pre-state underground militia Lehi who had been hanged in 1945 for having assassinated British politician Lord Moyne in Cairo in November 1944.

During the Israeli invasion of Lebanon (the Litani Operation) IDF soldier Avraham Amram was captured in a clash on April 5, 1978, with Palestinian PFLP-GC forces near Rashidieh camp in South Lebanon. Four other Israeli soldiers were killed while two others managed to escape to Israeli held territory. He was exchanged March 14, 1979, for 76 convicted Palestinian prisoners held in Israeli jails, 20 of whom "with blood on their hands." The prisoner swap was described as Israel's "first prisoner exchange with an Arab terrorist organization". Among those released in the exchange was Hafez Dalkamoni, who would later be described as one of the “key-aids” of Ahmed Jibril, the leader of the PFLP-GC. In 1988 he was arrested in West Germany on suspicion of terrorist activities. He is believed by some to have led the cell that carried out the Lockerbie bombing.

=== 1980s ===
September 3, 1982, four Palestinian Fatah fighters surprised an IDF outpost near Bhamdoun in central Lebanon. The commander of the Palestinian squad was Eissa Hajjo. Eight IDF soldiers from the Nahal brigade surrendered without a fight and were taken prisoners by the Palestinians. Their behavior was deemed "unacceptable" by IDF Chief of Staff Moshe Levy. The pro-Syrian PFLP-GC, led by Ahmad Jibril, helped the Fatah fighters and their prisoners with transportation away from the frontline. PFLP-GC kept two of the Israeli prisoners.

Six of these soldiers (Eliyahu Abutbul, Danny Gilboa, Rafael Hazan, Reuven Cohen, Avraham Mindvelsky, and Avraham Kronenfeld) were released November 23, 1983, in exchange for 4,765 Palestinians and Lebanese imprisoned at Ansar camp during the 1982 Lebanon war and 65 Palestinian prisoners from Israeli jails.

In 1984, Israel swapped 291 Syrian prisoners and the bodies of 72 others in exchange for six Israeli prisoners and five bodies.

The remaining two soldiers from the Bhamdoun raid in the hands of PFLP-GC (Yosef Grof and Nissim Salem), as well as a third IDF prisoner (Hezi Shai) captured during the battle of Sultan Ya'qoub, also held by the PFLP-GC, were released May 20, 1985, in an exchange known as the Jibril Agreement for 1,150 Palestinian prisoners held in Israeli jails. Among those released were 380 prisoners sentenced to life imprisonment.

During the so-called "Jibril deal" several controversial prisoners, such as Kozo Okamoto, were released.

In July 1985, Israel freed more than 700 Lebanese detainees. Shi'ite leaders say their freedom was guaranteed in exchange for the return of 39 foreign passengers from the hijacking of TWA flight 847. Israel denies a connection.

=== 1990s ===
On September 12, 1991, the body of IDF Druze soldier Samir Assad, was returned to Israel in exchange for two members of the Palestinian DFLP faction. Assad was killed outside Sidon in 1983.

Two Israeli soldiers, Yosef Fink and Rachmim Alsheich, were killed in a Hezbollah attack on an IDF roadblock at Beit Yahoun in southern Lebanon on July 17, 1986. Their bodies were retained by the Lebanese and only released on July 21, 1996, in exchange for the bodies of 123 Lebanese fighters held by Israel. Hezbollah released 17 soldiers from the South Lebanon Army (SLA) while the SLA released 45 detainees from the Khiam prison.

On May 25, 1998, the remains of IDF soldier Itamar Ilyah was exchanged for 65 Lebanese prisoners and the bodies of 40 Hezbollah fighters and Lebanese soldiers captured by Israel. Among those returned to Lebanon, were the remains of Hadi Nasrallah, the son of Hezbollah Secretary-General Hassan Nasrallah, who was killed in a clash with IDF the year before. Ilyah was killed in a devastating Hezbollah ambush at Ansariya, where 12 soldiers from the elite naval commando unit Shayetet 13 were killed on September 5, 1997.

=== 2000s ===
In 2003, Israel released the remains of two Hezbollah members, in exchange for allowing a German mediator to visit the Israeli Col. Elhanan Tannenbaum held by Hezbollah, kidnapped in Dubai in 2000.

Over 400 Palestinian and 30 Lebanese prisoners, including Hezbollah leaders ash-Sheikh Abdal-Karim Obeid and Mustafa Dirani, as well as the remains of 59 Lebanese killed by Israel, were exchanged in 2004 for the bodies of three IDF soldiers (Adi Avitan, Benny Avraham and Omar Souad) captured in the Sheba Farms area in 2000 as well as Elhanan Tannenbaum.

In October 2007 Israel and Hezbollah agreed to exchange Hassan Aqil, a civilian Hezbollah member captured in 2006, and the remains of two Hezbollah fighters killed in the 2006 Lebanon war and subsequently brought to Israel, for the remains of Gabriel Dwait, an Israeli resident who drowned in 2005 and was washed ashore in Lebanon.

In January 2008, Hezbollah Secretary General Hassan Nasrallah held a speech at the annual Ashura celebration in Beirut where he accused Israel of dragging its feet in the prisoner exchange negotiations. He also disclosed that the organization, apart from two captive soldiers, were also holding the partial remains of several other soldiers killed in the war. He claimed that the IDF had "lied" to the relatives when they returned supposedly intact bodies for burial.

Nasrallah's speech aimed at speeding up the negotiations with Israel but it created a lot of bad blood in Israel, both among the relatives of those who were led to believe that their bodies had been buried intact and among Israeli politicians who accused Hezbollah of waging "psychological warfare" against Israel. Several ministers called for the "elimination" of the Hezbollah leader.

On June 1, 2008, Israel released the Lebanese prisoner Nasim Nisr, in exchange for which Hezbollah handed over the partial remains of up to 20 Israeli soldiers killed during the 2006 Lebanon War.

In July 2008 Israel released long time serving Lebanese prisoner Samir al-Quntar, four Hezbollah fighters captured in the 2006 Lebanon war and the bodies of 199 Palestinian, Lebanese of Arab fighters captured by Israel in the past three decades. Kuntar had been convicted for his role in the 1979 Nahariya attack, which resulted in the deaths of four Israelis, including two small children. According to eyewitness accounts, Kuntar bludgeoned a four-year-old girl to death. In exchange Hezbollah released the bodies of two Israeli soldiers (Ehud Goldwasser and Eldad Regev) captured in a cross-border raid July 12, 2006.

=== 2010s ===
On October 18, 2011, captured IDF tank gunner Gilad Shalit, captured by the Palestinian militant organization Hamas in 2006, was released in exchange for 1027 Palestinian prisoners held in Israel.

=== 2020s ===
During the Gaza war, a series of exchanges were made between Israel and Hamas to exchange Hamas-held hostages for Palestinian prisoners. The negotiations were brokered by Qatar, Egypt, and the United States, and were part of two temporary ceasefire agreements, in 2023 and January 2025, and the October 2025 Gaza peace plan.

== See also ==
- Israeli MIAs
- Lebanese prisoners in Israel
- Hannibal Directive
