= List of prisoners released by Israel in the Gilad Shalit prisoner exchange =

This is the list of the prisoners released by Israel as part of the Gilad Shalit prisoner exchange agreement with Hamas in exchange for the Israel Defense Forces (IDF) soldier Gilad Shalit.

The agreement is implemented in two stages – In the first stage, Gilad Shalit was transferred from the Gaza Strip to Egypt and from there to Israel; concurrently, Israel released 477 prisoners. In the second stage, which took place during December 2011, another 550 prisoners were released.

The 1,027 prisoners released were mainly Palestinians and Arab-Israelis, though among the prisoners released there was also a Syrian, Ukrainian and a Jordanian. 280 of these were sentenced to life in prison for planning and perpetrating violent attacks against Israelis. The military Hamas leader Ahmed Jabari was quoted in the Saudi Arabian newspaper Al-Hayat as confirming that the prisoners released as part of the deal were collectively responsible for the killing of 569 Israeli civilians.

In October 2012, data compiled by the Israeli government indicated that dozens of the released Palestinian prisoners in the Gilad Shalit prisoner exchange had resumed terrorist activity. Many of them have joined the leadership of Hamas, other Palestinian prisoners have instead developed weapons and fired rockets at Israeli population centers, and some have recruited members to new terrorist cells in the West Bank. One of these cells in Hebron planted a bomb and plotted to kidnap an Israeli soldier. Prisoners in the West Bank have also engaged in violent activity, and Israel arrested 40 of them for rioting, hurling Molotov cocktails, handling funding for terrorism, and other acts.

== First phase: 477 prisoners released on October 18, 2011 ==
In the first stage of the prisoner swap deal Israel released 477 prisoners, 450 men and 27 women.

The official list, which includes the crimes the prisoners were convicted of, was published by the Israel Prison Services and is available in Hebrew only, though a Google Translate version into English has been placed online as well.

Name	Home	Year of Birth	Date of Arrest	Sentence	Destination^{4}	Notes
Bushra al-Tawil	Ramallah	1993	July 2011	16 months	Home^{1} – West Bank	Photojournalist
'Asi, Mahdi Shukri Khalil	Nablus	1975	December 13, 2002	20 years	Home^{1} – West Bank	?
A'biyat, A'isha Muhammad	Bethlehem	1986	August 13, 2009	3 years	Home^{1} – West Bank	?
Abayat, Ayad Musa Salem	Bethlehem	1971	November 2, 2003	21 years	Relocation^{2} – Gaza / Abroad	Fatah (Al-Aqsa Martyrs' Brigades) member convicted of two shooting attacks in 2000 and 2002.
Abd al-Haq, Nidal Sabhi Mamduh	Nablus	1982	June 25, 2003	1 life sentence	Home^{1} – West Bank	?
Abd al-Samed, Muid Abd al-Rahim Asad	Tulkarm	1962	June 14, 1987	4 life sentences	Home^{1} – West Bank	?
Abd Dabel, Hafez Mahmud	Gaza	1966	September 20, 1990	25 years	Home^{1} – Gaza	?
abd Hanaini, Abd al-Hakim Abd al-Aziz	Nablus	1965	April 28, 1993	1 life sentence	Relocation^{2} – Abroad	Convicted of making bombs for militant groups. Deported to Qatar.
abd Najib, Zaqariyah Lutfi	East Jerusalem	1956	October 14, 1994	22 years, 8 months	Relocation^{2} – Gaza / Abroad – 3 years	?
Abd Rabbah, Nasser Musa Ahmed	East Jerusalem	1967	February 9, 1988	37 years, 8 months	Security Arrangement^{3} – Jerusalem	Convicted of killing a Palestinian prisoner suspected of collaborating with the Israeli authorities. Abd Rabbah was rearrested during the 2014 Israel-Gaza conflict. He was accused of being in contact with a terrorist group and ordered to serve the remainder of his sentence.
Abdallah, Abdalhalim Mahmud Hasan	Gaza	1967	February 15, 1990	1 life sentence	Home^{1} – Gaza	?
Abdallah, Tawfiq Ibrahim Muhammad	Qalqiliya	1955	March 8, 1986	1 life sentence	Home^{1} – West Bank	?
Abu Aadi, Yussuf Dhib Hamed	Ramallah	1976	December 28, 2005	1 life sentence	Relocation^{2} – Gaza / Abroad	Convicted of stabbing Israeli soldier Nir Kahana in 2005.
abu al-Jadiyan, Hassam Suleiman Fiyad	Gaza	1968	February 9, 1988	32 years, 6 months	Home^{1} – Gaza	?
Abu al-Rabb, Ashraf Khalil Husain	Jenin	1976	March 26, 2002	35 years	Home^{1} – West Bank	?
abu al-Rub, Wahib Abdullah Khalil	Jenin	1969	November 30, 1994	1 life sentence	Security Arrangement^{3} – West Bank	?
Abu Alba, Halil Muhammad Muhammad	Gaza	1965	February 14, 2001	8 life sentences	Home^{1} – Gaza	?
Abu Amar, Bilal Ibrahim Salim	Nablus	1979	September 5, 2002	2 life sentences	Relocation^{2} – Gaza / Abroad – 3 years	?
Abu Armila, Marwan Muhammad Ayub	East Jerusalem	1971	September 30, 1993	2 life sentences	Relocation^{2} – Abroad	?
Abu Arqub, Amjad Ahmad Muhammad	Hebron	1982	October 9, 2002	25 years	Relocation^{2} – Gaza / Abroad	Convicted of recruiting the perpetrator of a 2002 attack on Karmei Tzur, in which three people were killed.
Abu Arqub, Hamza Hussein Hassan	Nablus	1979	August 16, 2002	2 life sentences	Home^{1} – West Bank	?
Abu Asb, Atiyah Hassam Sarhan	Hebron	1965	August 17, 1994	2 life sentences	Relocation^{2} – Gaza / Abroad	?
Abu Asneina, Bassam Ibrahim Abd al-Qader	East Jerusalem	1973	February 8, 2000	1 life sentence	Relocation^{2} – Gaza / Abroad	With Riyad Asila, murdered yeshiva student Chaim Kerman in 1998.
Abu Asnina, Umar Hamdan Taha	Hebron	1981	February 26, 2002	2 life sentences	Relocation^{2} – Gaza / Abroad	Asnina, a Hamas activist, was re-arrested in April 2012 and accused of plotting an abduction.
Abu Attayah, Muhammad Abdulkarim Salah	Gaza	1969	July 30, 1992	16 life sentences	Home^{1} – Gaza	Hamas (Izz ad-Din al-Qassam Brigades) member who carried out attacks in Gaza
Abu Awid, Muhammad Ahmad Ismail	Nablus	1979	April 7, 2003	25 years	Relocation^{2} – Gaza / Abroad	?
Abu Ayish, Muhammad Agmiyan Jama'a	Gaza	1967	July 30, 1992	4 life sentences	Home^{1} – Gaza	One of three members of a cell of the Izz ad-Din al-Qassam Brigades accused of the murders of David Cohen, Moshe Beno and Amikam Salzmann, who worked in agriculture in Gaza, as well as the murders of 20 Gaza Arabs accused of collaborating with Israel.
Abu Ayyash, Fatina Mustafa Khalil	Nablus	1985	July 21, 2006	15 years	Home^{1} – West Bank	?
Abu Dara'a, Latifa Muhammad	Nablus	1964	December 9, 2003	25 years	Home^{1} – West Bank	took part in an attempted bombing by smuggling a suicide belt from the West Bank into Israel
Abu Daud, Ayman Yusuf Ahmad	Hebron	1982	July 28, 2004	36 years	Security Arrangement^{3} – West Bank	Convicted of membership in a terrorist cell that conducted four shootings, Abu Daud was re-arrested in February 2012.
Abu Eid, Salman Ahmed Salman	Ramallah	1964	May 13, 2003	1 life sentence	Security Arrangement^{3} – West Bank	?
Abu Funun, Ayyad Ata Ahmad	Bethlehem	1979	October 24, 2003	29 years	Home^{1} – West Bank	?
Abu Hasana, Mustafa Ayyad Ahmad	Gaza	1973	March 15, 1989	30 years	Home^{1} – Gaza	?
Abu Hud'a, Muhammad Salame Hamad	Gaza	1976	March 6, 1976	1 life sentence	Home^{1} – Gaza	?
Abu Hujla, Ibrahim Abd al-Qadir Mahmud	Qalqiliya	1958	December 31, 2002	24 years	Home^{1} – West Bank	Was re-arrested in June 2012.
Abu Jalala, Muhammad Mustafa Hassan	Gaza	1965	August 4, 1991	4 life sentences	Home^{1} – Gaza	?
Abu Jalbus, Waal Kamal Ahmed	Jenin	1980	October 12, 2002	1 life sentence	Home^{1} – West Bank	?
Abu Jamus, Muhammad Salman Marzuq	Gaza	1978	April 23, 2002	27 years, 8 months	Home^{1} – Gaza	?
Abu Karash, Maher Hussein Muhammad	Gaza	1972	April 20, 1993	4 life sentences	Home^{1} – Gaza	?
Abu Kashk, Nahed Assam Sharif	Tulkarm	1978	May 8, 2001	1 life sentence	Relocation^{2} – Gaza / Abroad	?
Abu Khalil, Ayman Muhammad Abd al-Rahim	East Jerusalem	1972	December 8, 1994	3 life sentences	Relocation^{2} – Abroad	Convicted by an Israeli military court of participating in the kidnapping and murder of two hitchhiking soldiers, Shahar Simani and Arye Frankenthal. The group also planned an attack on the residence of Ariel Sharon.
Abu Labda, Rayid Amar Abdulhamid	Gaza	1971	March 16, 2001	1 life sentence	Home^{1} – Gaza	?
Abu Mariam, Tarek Muhammad Abd al-Latif	Qalqiliya	1980	April 7, 2002	1 life sentence	Relocation^{2} – Gaza / Abroad	?
Abu Murkhiya, Ashraf Abd al-Qadir Tawfiq	Hebron	1975	May 28, 2002	23 years, 6 months	Relocation^{2} – Gaza / Abroad	?
Abu Mustafa, Taleb Ismail Ibrahim	Gaza	1972	May 18, 1993	2 life sentences	Home^{1} – Gaza	?
Abu Nasar, Walid Ibrahim Muhammad	Bethlehem	1973	September 21, 1993	1 life sentence	Relocation^{2} – Gaza / Abroad	?
Abu Qatish, Majid Hassan Rajab	East Jerusalem	1970	May 6, 1993	3 life sentences	Relocation^{2} – Abroad	took part in the murder of the Israeli policeman Nissim Toledano in 1992.
Abu Ramuz, Ma'edh Said Yaqub	Hebron	1986	August 13, 2004	18 years	Security Arrangement^{3} – West Bank	?
Abu Rukab, Murad Abdallah Ismail	Gaza	1983	March 20, 2003	27 years	Home^{1} – Gaza	?
Abu Saif, Sulaiman Salim Hamdan	Hebron	1968	September 14, 1994	20 years	Security Arrangement^{3} – West Bank	?
Abu Salah, Abd al-Rahman Hassan Abd al-Fatah	Jenin	1954	June 25, 2002	25 years	Security Arrangement^{3} – West Bank	?
Abu Salah, As'ad Fahmi As'ad	Gaza	1964	March 19, 2008	25 years	Home^{1} – Gaza	?
Abu Saleh, Jamal Hamad Hussein	East Jerusalem	1964	August 20, 1990	1 life sentence	Security Arrangement^{3} – Jerusalem	While serving time in prison, Abu Saleh was convicted of murdering a fellow Palestinian prisoner suspected of collaborating with the Israeli authorities. During the 2014 Israel-Gaza conflict, Abu Saleh was rearrested by Israel and accused of violating his parole by being in contact with terrorists. Abu Saleh was ordered to spend the remainder of his sentence in prison.
Abu Samra, Ramyah Rateb Hassan	Hebron	1980	December 17, 2010	1 year, 6 months	Home^{1} – West Bank	?
Abu Sarhan, Amir Sa'ud Salih	Bethlehem	1972	May 11, 1990	3 life sentences	Relocation^{2} – Gaza / Abroad	killed three Israelis with a knife in 1990.
Abu Sariya, Mahmud Abdallah Abd al-Rahman	Hebron	1976	October 5, 2002	38 years	Security Arrangement^{3} – West Bank	?
Abu Sariya, Mahmud Abdallah Abd al-Rahman	Jenin	1977	January 30, 1996	1 life sentence	Relocation^{2} – Gaza / Abroad	?
Abu Seif, Abdallah Ahmed Mahmud	Hebron	1983	May 9, 2003	2 life sentences	Relocation^{2} – Gaza / Abroad	?
Abu Shabb, Salim Husain Khalil	Gaza	1964	April 20, 1993	1 life sentence	Home^{1} – Gaza	?
abu Shalbaq, Abdullah Juda Muhammad	Ramallah	1968	February 14, 1991	1 life sentence	Security Arrangement^{3} – West Bank	?
Abu Sharakh, Maedh Waal Taleb	Hebron	1980	November 3, 2003	19 life sentences	Relocation^{2} – Gaza / Abroad	One of the organizers of the attack on bus No. 37 in Haifa in 2002 and other attacks (17 killed, more than 50 wounded).
Abu Shukhaidim, Firas Walid	Hebron	1980	November 6, 2001	13 years, 4 months	Security Arrangement^{3} – West Bank	?
Abu Sir, Samer Ibrahim Wadad	East Jerusalem	1965	January 22, 1988	1 life sentence	Relocation^{2} – Gaza / Abroad	?
Abu Sitta, Hani Muhammad Sulaiman	Gaza	1974	January 21, 1994	1 life sentence	Home^{1} – Gaza	?
Abu Taha, Ahmed Abdulkarim Ali	Gaza	1980	April 2, 2002	27 years	Home^{1} – Gaza	Abu Taha was involved in preparing explosives for Hamas terrorists in Ramallah, including a 29 July 2001 Jerusalem car bombing. A member of the Ibrahim Abu Rub and Ballal Baraguti organizations, he transported suicide bomber Ra'ad Baraguti from Ramallah to Jerusalem, where he exploded on Hanevi'im Street on 4 September 2001 and injured 14 people.
Abu Turki, Nadir Radwan	Hebron	1974	November 10, 2002	15 years	Relocation^{2} – Gaza / Abroad	Abu Turki was convicted of membership in Hamas' military wing, as well as conspiracy to commit murder, throwing stones, and planting a bomb. After his release, Abu Turki opened a pastry shop in Gaza with another former inmate.
Abu Ukal, Nabil Mudayris Muhammad	Gaza	1973	June 1, 2002	21 years	Home^{1} – Gaza	?
Abu Zina, Nasrin	Tulkarm	1984	August 18, 2009	2 years, 10 months	Home^{1} – West Bank	?
Abu-Assaf, Abd-Al-Rahman Umar Sadeq	Jenin	1954	April 29, 1992	2 life sentences	Home^{1} – West Bank	?
abu-Gaben, Jihad Jamil Mahmud	Gaza	1970	August 9, 1988	30 years, 6 months	Home^{1} – Gaza	?
Abu-Hasira, Ahmad Abd-Al-Rahman Husein	Gaza	1952	February 18, 1986	35 years, 1 months	Home^{1} – Gaza	?
Abu-Hasira, Muhammad Muhammad Said	Gaza	1971	October 29, 1993	3 life sentences	Home^{1} – Gaza	?
Abu-Naim, Kamal Abdallah Suleman	Gaza	1969	February 18, 1992	3 life sentences	Home^{1} – Gaza	?
Abu-Naim, Tawfiq Abdallah Suleman	Gaza	1962	May 15, 1989	1 life sentence	Home^{1} – Gaza	?
Abu-Rayan, Imad Ali Aballah	Gaza	1973	March 21, 1991	41 years, 6 months	Home^{1} – Gaza	?
Abu-Taqiya, Ayad Jamil Abd-Al-Salam	Gaza	1971	November 27, 1992	40 years	Home^{1} – Gaza	?
Abu-Tuyur, Suleman Naef Hasan	Ramallah	1967	February 9, 1991	25 years	Security Arrangement^{3} – West Bank	?
Adawidar, Nasser Gazi Muhammad	Gaza	1967	January 20, 1992	11 life sentence	Home^{1} – Gaza	?
Afanah, Mustafa Ghazi Mustafa	Gaza	1977	August 13, 2001	25 years	Home^{1} – Gaza	?
Ahmad, Mu'jn Abd al-Malik Muhammad	Jabaliya	1965	June 4, 2004	10 life sentences	Home^{1} – Gaza	?
Ajuli, Majdi Atiya Suleman	Tulkarm	1961	October 16, 1989	1 life sentence	Security Arrangement^{3} – West Bank	?
Akari, Musa Daud Muhammad	East Jerusalem	1971	July 25, 1993	3 life sentences	Relocation^{2} – Abroad	took part in the murder of the Israeli policeman Nissim Toledano in 1992.
Al-Achras, Anwar Muslem Naserallah	Gaza	1973	March 16, 1993	25 years	Home^{1} – Gaza	?
al-Ak, Ramzi Ibrahim Muhammad	Bethlehem	1981	March 24, 2003	30 years	Relocation^{2} – Gaza / Abroad	Convicted of involvement in attempted bombings and of involvement in sniper attacks on the Jerusalem neighborhood of Gilo
al-Akhras, Murid Salim Mansur	Gaza	1982	November 20, 2001	20 years	Home^{1} – Gaza	?
al-Amudi, Ali Muhammad Ali	Gaza	1975	February 24, 1994	3 life sentences	Home^{1} – Gaza	?
al-Aqad, Muanes Ahmed Hussein	Gaza	1976	June 21, 2002	1 life sentence	Home^{1} – Gaza	?
al-Asafra, Ali Izzat Muhammad	Hebron	1982	October 29, 2002	4 life sentences	Relocation^{2} – Gaza / Abroad	?
al-Awaiwi, Safwan Muhammad Yasri	Hebron	1981	April 30, 2002	2 life sentences	Home^{1} – West Bank	?
al-Awaiwi, Shakib Baher Shakib	Hebron	1983	January 12, 2006	8 life sentences	Relocation^{2} – Gaza / Abroad	Member of a four-person group that carried out a series of attacks including the June 2005 murders of Aviad Mantzour and Avichai Levy at a bus stop near Beit Haggai, a July 2005 shooting attack on Israeli soldiers in Hebron which left an Arab passerby dead, the October 2005 murders of Matat Rosenfeld Adler, Kinneret Mandel and Oz Meir and the December 2005 killing of Yossi Shok.
al-Bandak, Kris Adel Ishaq	Bethlehem	1979	February 6, 2003	4 life sentences	Relocation^{2} – Gaza / Abroad	Tanzim member convicted of perpetrating several shootings in 2002 which left two Israelis dead and a third seriously wounded. The only known Christian Tanzim member.
al-Barghuti, Jasser Ismail Musa	Ramallah	1973	December 20, 2003	9 life sentences	Relocation^{2} – Gaza / Abroad	According to Israel's Ministry of Foreign Affairs, al-Barghuti was a member of a Hamas cell in the West Bank village of Kobar and was the liaison between the cell and Hamas' command. This cell carried out two shooting attacks that each resulted in the death of one Israeli soldier and also made two failed attempts to bomb an Israeli checkpoint.
al-Bass, Wafa' Samir	Gaza	1984	June 20, 2008	12 years	Home^{1} – Gaza	attempted to commit a suicide bombing at the Erez Crossing by detonating an explosive device hidden in her pants but the bomb malfunctioned.
al-Bazyan, Alaa al-Din Radha	East Jerusalem	1958	April 20, 1986	1 life sentence	Security Arrangement^{3} – Jerusalem	Convicted of perpetrating sniper attacks and belonging to a terrorist group.
Al-Chatib, Bahaa Al-Din Sadeq Ali	Gaza	1980	December 21, 2001	24 years	Home^{1} – Gaza	?
Al-Chawajah, Yaser Mahmud Muhammad	Gaza	1971	August 7, 1988	1 life sentence	Home^{1} – Gaza	?
al-Dawik, Fadi Muhammad Jamal Morteza	Hebron	1983	June 14, 2002	5 life sentences	Relocation^{2} – Gaza / Abroad	?
al-Din, Harun Mansur Ya'aqub Nasser	Hebron	1970	December 15, 1992	1 life sentence	Relocation^{2} – Abroad	?
al-Fakhuri, Nahid Abd al-Rauf	Hebron	1977	June 6, 2002	22 years	Relocation^{2} – Gaza / Abroad	Convicted of recruiting suicide bombers in Hebron.
al-Far, Muhammad Afif Ashur	Gaza	1965	August 16, 1993	2 life sentences	Home^{1} – Gaza	In an interview with the BBC, al-Far stated that he had been a senior figure in the Popular Front for the Liberation of Palestine and that he "planned and co-ordinated attacks against Israeli targets."
Al-Ghul, Umar Mahmud Jaber	Gaza	1961	October 13, 1987	4 life sentences	Home^{1} – Gaza	According to his family, Al-Ghul was convicted of involvement in attacks on Israeli targets in Gaza before the First Intifada and for membership in a secret armed group.
al-Halisi, Abd al-Nasser Daud	East Jerusalem	1959	October 16, 1986	1 life sentence	Relocation^{2} – Gaza / Abroad	?
al-Halisi, Tarek Daud Mustafa	East Jerusalem	1966	October 16, 1986	1 life sentence	Relocation^{2} – Gaza / Abroad	?
al-Harub, Dharar Muhammad Abdallah	Bethlehem	1976	June 5, 2002	1 life sentence	Relocation^{2} – Gaza / Abroad	in 2002 delivered a suicide bomber to his destination.
al-Hashlimun, Mus'ab Ismail	Hebron	1982	September 9, 2004	17 life sentences	Relocation^{2} – Gaza / Abroad	Involved in the planning of the double attack in Beersheba in 2004 (17 killed), which killed 16 people.
Al-Hatu, Ahmad Ata Chalil	Gaza	1969	October 11, 1993	25 years	Home^{1} – Gaza	?
al-Haymuni, Bassel Hashem Abd al-Fatah	Hebron	1979	October 16, 2004	23 years	Relocation^{2} – Gaza / Abroad	?
al-Jaaba, Fadi Muhammad Ibrahim	Hebron	1982	March 7, 2003	18 life sentences	Relocation^{2} – Gaza / Abroad	One of the organizers of the attack on bus No. 37 in Haifa in 2002 (17 killed, more than 50 wounded).
al-Jaaba, Majid Muhammad Yunes	Hebron	1970	April 16, 1995	2 life sentences	Relocation^{2} – Gaza / Abroad	?
al-Jaabari, Muammar Rashad Muhammad	Hebron	1985	June 20, 2003	1 life sentence	Security Arrangement^{3} – West Bank	?
al-Jaabari, Waal Kamal Saleh	Hebron	1977	December 12, 2000	2 life sentences	Relocation^{2} – Gaza / Abroad	?
al-Jabbur, Safwat Jibril Jabr	West Bank	1975	October 8, 2002	2 life sentences	Home^{1} – West Bank	?
Al-Jisrawi, Zakariya Muhammad Falah	Hebron	1974	February 25, 1996	1 life sentence	Security Arrangement^{3} – West Bank	?
al-Julani, Muhammad Ishaq Ali	Hebron	1982	January 21, 2006	4 life sentences	Relocation^{2} – Gaza / Abroad	Member of a four-person group that carried out a series of attacks including the June 2005 murders of Aviad Mantzour and Avichai Levy at a bus stop near Beit Haggai, a July 2005 shooting attack on Israeli soldiers in Hebron which left an Arab passerby dead, the October 2005 murders of Matat Rosenfeld Adler, Kinneret Mandel and Oz Meir and the December 2005 killing of Yossi Shok.
al-Ka'bi, Allam Ahmad As'ad	Nablus	1974	April 28, 2003	9 life sentences	Relocation^{2} – Gaza / Abroad	?
Al-Kabash, Talal Yusif Ahmed Abu	Jenin	1955	June 25, 1985	34 years, 6 months	Relocation^{2} – Gaza / Abroad	?
al-Karki, Raja'i Saadi Suleiman	Hebron	1977	December 12, 2000	2 life sentences	Relocation^{2} – Gaza / Abroad	?
al-Karnaz, Luayy Yunus Sha'ban	Ramallah	1984	April 23, 2004	30 years	Relocation^{2} – Gaza / Abroad	?
al-Khalis, Yusuf Musa Mahmud	East Jerusalem	1973	August 19, 1991	1 life sentence	Relocation^{2} – Gaza / Abroad	?
al-Kilani, Zayd Arsan Hafez	Jenin	1973	January 3, 2001	1 life sentence	Relocation^{2} – Gaza / Abroad	?
al-Luh, Imad Mustafa Khamis	Gaza	1980	December 28, 2003	19 years	Home^{1} – Gaza	?
al-Maghribi, Ali Yusuf Ahmad	Gaza	1986	May 27, 2002	2 life sentences	Home^{1} – Gaza	took part in the coordination of several suicide attacks, including the Café Moment bombing
Al-Mahariq, Rasmi Saleh Muhammad	Hebron	1962	September 14, 1994	20 years	Security Arrangement^{3} – West Bank	?
Al-Maqadmeh, Hasan Ahmad Chaled	Gaza	1960	May 19, 1989	30 years	Home^{1} – Gaza	?
al-Masalma, Muhammad Badawi Khalil	Hebron	1966	August 29, 2002	4 life sentences	Relocation^{2} – Gaza / Abroad	?
Al-Masri, Imad Hamad Ahmad	East Jerusalem	1972	March 5, 1991	1 life sentence	Relocation^{2} – Gaza / Abroad	?
al-Masri, Rami Zaki Ibrahim	Gaza	1980	November 6, 2006	40 years	Home^{1} – Gaza	Convicted of participating in the 2000 Ramallah Lynching by inciting a mob to enter a police station where two Israeli reservists were being held and by kicking one of the captured soldiers in the shoulder. The two soldiers were beaten to death by the crowd.
Al-Mughir, Chaled Saleh Jaber	Gaza	1970	August 13, 1992	3 life sentences	Home^{1} – Gaza	?
al-Musulmani, Ali Badr Raghab	East Jerusalem	1957	April 28, 1986	1 life sentence	Home^{1} – Jerusalem	?
al-Na'imat, Mahaush Salame Mahaush al-Qadhi	Gaza	1973	September 8, 2007	Released prior to sentencing or conviction	Home^{1} – Gaza	?
Al-Nahal, Mazen Muhammad Suleman	Gaza	1974	July 6, 1992	4 life sentences	Home^{1} – Gaza	?
al-Najar, Ahmed Mustafa Saleh Hamed	Ramallah	1976	December 20, 2003	7 life sentences	Relocation^{2} – Gaza / Abroad	Hamas member who served as a lookout during shooting attacks that killed six Israelis. After release, he ran the terror cell responsible for the 2015 Shuvat Rachel shooting.
al-Namura, Akram Mahmud Taleb	Hebron	1978	December 14, 2001	1 life sentence	Relocation^{2} – Gaza / Abroad	?
al-Namura, Anis Mahmud Taleb	Hebron	1976	July 16, 2001	2 life sentences	Relocation^{2} – Gaza / Abroad	?
al-Nasser-Yataima, Nasir Sami Abd al-Razzaq Ali	Tulkarm	1977	October 4, 2002	29 life sentences	Relocation^{2} – Abroad	convicted of planning the Passover massacre (2002) in which 30 civilians were killed and 140 were wounded.
al-Natsha, Bassam Naim Izhaq	Hebron	1969	December 30, 1999	1 life sentence	Security Arrangement^{3} – West Bank	?
al-Nimla, Nasr Umar Muhammad	Gaza	1959	November 22, 1990	1 life sentence	Home^{1} – Gaza	Arrested for stabbing to death Zvia Gvirtz, a 28-year-old resident of Bat Yam. Al-Nimla had a romantic relationship with Gvirtz and killed her for personal, rather than political reasons.
al-Nims, Ghazi Juma Muhammad	Gaza	1958	November 30, 1985	1 life sentence	Home^{1} – Gaza	?
al-Qadhi, Ali Muhammad Ali	Ramallah	1986	September 25, 2005	1 life sentence	Relocation^{2} – Gaza / Abroad	Member of a Hamas cell responsible for kidnapping and killing Israeli businessman Sasson Nuriel in 2005.
al-Qadhi, Nasser Yussuf Mahmud	Gaza	1973	June 9, 1993	8 life sentences	Home^{1} – Gaza	?
al-Qadhmani, Assam Talaat Ahmed	East Jerusalem	1975	December 8, 1994	1 life sentence	Relocation^{2} – Abroad	?
al-Qaram, Muhammad Taher Mahmud	Jenin	1972	July 12, 2001	15 life sentences	Relocation^{2} – Gaza / Abroad	directly involved in the planning and execution of a bus attack in Haifa in which 15 Israelis were killed.
al-Qaram, Yussuf Taher Mahmud	Jenin	1976	July 12, 2001	15 life sentences	Relocation^{2} – Gaza / Abroad	Arrested for helping to plan the 2001 suicide bombing of a bus in Haifa which killed 15 people. Al-Qaram transported the bomber into Israel.
Al-Qasrawi, Fahed Fuad Muhlas	Hebron	1975	January 1, 2003	15 years	Home^{1} – West Bank	?
Al-Qatshan, Sami Chaled Suleman	Gaza	1981	February 13, 2003	20 years	Home^{1} – Gaza	?
al-Qawasimi, Muayyad Sulaiman Muhammad	Hebron	1986	February 28, 2008	1 life sentence	Relocation^{2} – Gaza / Abroad	?
al-Rajbi, Amar Rabah Muhammad	Hebron	1982	August 13, 2004	30 years	Security Arrangement^{3} – West Bank	?
al-Rajub, Murad Awadh Yunes	Hebron	1979	May 10, 2002	38 years	Relocation^{2} – Gaza / Abroad	?
al-Rayis, Mahmud Shakir Mahmud	Gaza	1979	February 18, 2003	22 years	Home^{1} – Gaza	?
al-Razem, Fuad Qassam Arafat	East Jerusalem	1957	January 30, 1981	3 life sentences	Relocation^{2} – Gaza / Abroad	?
al-Razem, Muhammad Ayman Nazmi Abd al-Jalil	East Jerusalem	1972	March 27, 1996	2 life sentences	Relocation^{2} – Abroad	One of eleven Hamas members in East Jerusalem arrested after the Jaffa Road bus bombings. According to the Israeli Foreign Ministry, five of the eleven admitted to having assisted in carrying out the bombings.
al-Sa'di, Fatin	Jenin	1984	May 8, 2008	4 years	Home^{1} – West Bank	?
al-Sa'idi, Akram Zaki Muhammad	Gaza	1980	June 27, 2003	20 years	Home^{1} – Gaza	?
al-Sakran, Muhammad Awda Muhammad	Gaza	1971	May 10, 1993	1 life sentence	Home^{1} – Gaza	?
al-Sarkaji, Nidal Jawad Taher	Nablus	1979	June 2, 2002	1 life sentence	Relocation^{2} – Abroad	?
al-Sarsur, Salem Rajab Mahmud	Hebron	1969	October 19, 1998	3 life sentences	Relocation^{2} – Abroad	?
al-Shakhshir, Ayman Hatem Afif	Nablus	1978	March 5, 2002	16 life sentences	Relocation^{2} – Gaza / Abroad	?
al-Shalabi, Abd al-Rauf Amin Abdallah	Jenin	1970	September 15, 1995	1 life sentence	Relocation^{2} – Gaza / Abroad	?
al-Shaludi, Fahed Sabri Barhan	East Jerusalem	1971	September 28, 1993	1 life sentence	Relocation^{2} – Abroad	took part in the kidnapping and murder of the Israeli soldier Yaron Chen.
al-Sharatha, Muhammad Yussuf Hassan	Gaza	1957	May 9, 1989	3 life sentences	Home^{1} – Gaza	head of the militant squad that kidnapped and murdered the Israeli soldiers Ilan Saadon and Avi Sasportas during the First Intifada. Originally sentenced to three consecutive life sentences.
Al-Shawa, Ayman Asaad Shaaban	Gaza	1964	September 3, 1993	5 life sentences	Home^{1} – Gaza	?
al-Shawish, Dawud Khalil Dawud	East Jerusalem	1974	December 31, 2000	24 years	Home^{1} – Jerusalem	?
Al-Sinwar, Yihia Ibrahim Hasan	Gaza	1962	January 21, 1988	4 life sentences	Home^{1} – Gaza	Founder of the Hamas security apparatus in Gaza. His brother organized the abduction of Gilad Shalit in 2006. After his release he called for further kidnappings of Israeli soldiers. Became the head of Hamas in the Gaza Strip in 2017 and masterminded the Hamas-led attack on Israel on October 7, 2023.
al-Sufi, Muhammad Salama 'Abid	Gaza	1977	June 9, 2007	Released prior to sentencing or conviction	Home^{1} – Gaza	?
Al-Suwaiti, Mahmud Muhammad Ismail	Hebron	1974	January 10, 2000	15 years	Security Arrangement^{3} – West Bank	?
al-Takruri, Ahmed Jibril Othman	Jericho	1964	October 31, 1988	1 life sentence	Relocation^{2} – Gaza / Abroad	Carried out firebomb attack on a bus in Jericho, in which a mother and her three children, and a soldier who tried to rescue them, were killed.
al-Tal, Amin Yussuf Ismail	Bethlehem	1979	January 13, 1999	1 life sentence	Relocation^{2} – Gaza / Abroad	?
al-Tamimi, Ahmad Yusuf Mahmud	Ramallah	1961	November 11, 1993	1 life sentence	Home^{1} – West Bank	?
al-Tamimi, Nizar Samir Mahmud	Ramallah	1973	November 9, 1993	1 life sentence	Home^{1} – West Bank	Convicted for participating in the 1993 kidnapping and murder of an Israeli settler.
al-Za'al, Rabia Salame Muhammad	East Jerusalem	1975	October 9, 1998	27 years	Relocation^{2} – Abroad	One of five members of a Hamas cell accused of carrying out an attack in Tel Aviv that wounded 16 people and an attack in the Mount Scopus neighborhood of Jerusalem that wounded one Israeli soldier.
al-Zin, Rajab Muhammad Shehada	East Jerusalem	1968	October 29, 1998	1 life sentence	Security Arrangement^{3} – Jerusalem	?
al-Zir, Nasri Yussuf Khalil	Bethlehem	1968	April 19, 2002	1 life sentence	Relocation^{2} – Gaza / Abroad	According to Israel's Ministry of Foreign Affairs, al-Zir was a leader of the Al-Aqsa Martyrs Brigade in Bethlehem.
Alajrab, Rateb Abdallah Jidan	Ramallah	1966	November 10, 1991	2 life sentences	Relocation^{2} – Gaza / Abroad	?
Alawi, Mazin Mustafa Yusuf	East Jerusalem	1970	August 23, 1991	40 years	Relocation^{2} – Gaza / Abroad	?
Ali, Abd al-Rahman Ahmed Hafez	Tulkarm	1977	August 17, 2001	1 life sentence	Relocation^{2} – Gaza / Abroad	?
Ali, Hamd Allah Faiq al-Hajj	Qalqiliya	1978	September 5, 2002	20 years	Relocation^{2} – Gaza / Abroad – 3 years	?
Ali, Hanan Ahmed	Bethlehem	1969	October 11, 2010	Released prior to sentencing or conviction	Home^{1} – West Bank	?
Ali, Imad Abd-Al-Rahim Abd Al-Hafez Husein	Salfit	1966	November 21, 1992	30 years	Home^{1} – West Bank	?
Almasri, Aatef Suleman Daud	Gaza	1968	November 3, 1993	5 life sentences	Home^{1} – Gaza	?
Alnatsha, Arafat Salem Ibrahim	Hebron	1973	August 29, 1994	1 life sentence	Relocation^{2} – Gaza / Abroad	?
Alrajbi, Tareq Zayad Yusef	Hebron	1982	September 3, 2003	21 years	Relocation^{2} – Abroad	?
Alzr, Alyan Abd Al-Karim Salamah	Gaza	1965	May 2, 2003	20 years	Home^{1} – Gaza	?
Amar Ali Ahmed Asaida	Nablus	1979	October 4, 2002	4 life sentences	Relocation^{2} – Gaza / Abroad	?
Amar, Abd-Al-Aziz Muhammad	East Jerusalem	1960	September 27, 2004	4 life sentences	Relocation^{2} – Gaza / Abroad	took part in the execution of the Café Hillel bombing (2003).
Amariya, Ali Abd Allah Salem	Israel	1975	November 24, 1988	40 years	Home^{1} – Israel	Convicted of throwing a fragmentation grenade into a Haifa crowd in 1988.
Amasha, Wassem Mahmud	Golan Heights	1981	November 8, 1999	20 years	Golan Heights	Forming a militancy cell, planning to kidnap an Israeli soldier.
Amira, Ahmed Rabah Ahmed	East Jerusalem	1968	October 25, 1988	37 years, 8 months	Security Arrangement^{3} – Jerusalem	?
Amr, Majdi Muhammad Ahmed	Hebron	1979	October 3, 2003	19 life sentences	Relocation^{2} – Abroad	In July 2001 shot to death 28-year-old David Cohen in front of his wife and children, in 2002 was of the organizers of the attack on bus No. 37 in Haifa (17 killed, more than 50 wounded). developed and manufactured new types of explosive devices.
Amrin, Fuad Muhammad Abdulhadi	Gaza	1973	May 24, 1992	1 life sentence	Home^{1} – Gaza	fatally stabbed 15-year-old schoolgirl Helena Rapp on her way to school in the Israeli city of Bat Yam.
Amru, Abir Isa	Hebron	1981	February 20, 2001	15 years, 3 months	Home^{1} – West Bank	?
Amru, Ayman abd al Majid Taleb	Hebron	1978	August 2, 2003	22 years	Relocation^{2} – Gaza / Abroad – 3 years	?
Anajas, Walid Abd al-Aziz Abd al-Hadi	Ramallah	1980	September 9, 2002	36 life sentences	Relocation^{2} – Abroad	took part in the execution of the Café Moment bombing in 2002 (11 killed, 54 wounded – 11 of them seriously), the Hebrew University bombing in 2002 (9 killed, more than 100 injured) and the Sheffield Club bombing in 2002 (16 killed, more than 60 injured – 20 of them seriously). Originally sentenced to 26 consecutive life sentences.
Anjatz, Abd al-Rauf Mahmud and al-Rauf	Ramallah	1982	October 10, 2003	29 years	Relocation^{2} – Gaza / Abroad – 3 years	?
Aqel, Khamis Zaki Abd al-Hadi	Gaza	1966	November 6, 1992	21 life sentence	Home^{1} – Gaza	Hamas (Qassam Brigades) member arrested in 1992 for being member of Qassam Brigades, which carried out series of bombings and other attacks
Aqel, Walid Zakariya Abd al-Hadi	Gaza	1963	January 20, 1992	16 life sentences	Relocation^{2} – Abroad	?
Ar'ir, Ayyad Salem Hussein	Gaza	1974	November 17, 1993	1 life sentence	Home^{1} – Gaza	?
Arafa, Wa'el Sulaiman Ali	Tulkarm	1979	January 21, 2002	20 years	Relocation^{2} – Gaza / Abroad	?
Arar, Abdallah Nasser Mahmud	Ramallah	1976	July 10, 2007	1 life sentence	Relocation^{2} – Gaza / Abroad	Member of the Hamas cell responsible for kidnapping and killing Israeli businessman Sasson Nuriel in 2005.
Arida, Kifah Jamil Sadiq	West Bank	1978	August 19, 1999	24 years, 9 months	Relocation^{2} – Gaza / Abroad	?
Arqiq, Jamal Amar Muhammad	Gaza	1971	December 23, 1989	35 years, 3 months	Home^{1} – Gaza	?
Aruqi, Rafat Ali Muhammad	Gaza	1970	May 19, 1993	1 life sentence	Home^{1} – Gaza	Convicted of murdering Ian Feinberg, a lawyer for an international aid organization in Gaza.
Asayla, Hazem Muhammad Sabri	East Jerusalem	1961	October 21, 1986	4 life sentences	Relocation^{2} – Abroad	?
Asayla, Riyadh Zakariya Khalil	East Jerusalem	1973	March 8, 2000	1 life sentence	Relocation^{2} – Gaza / Abroad	murdered yeshiva student Chaim Kerman in 1998 together with Bassam Ibrahim Abd al-Qader Abu Asneina.
Ashtiya, Sahir Nabil Muhammad	Nablus	1978	May 14, 2001	20 years	Relocation^{2} – Gaza / Abroad – 3 years	?
Asneina, Shaib Salah Tawfiq Abu	East Jerusalem	1967	October 25, 1998	1 life sentence	Relocation^{2} – Gaza / Abroad	?
Atwan, Mahmud Muhammad Ahmed	East Jerusalem	1970	March 6, 1993	3 life sentences	Relocation^{2} – Abroad	took part in the murder of the Israeli policeman Nissim Toledano in 1992.
Awad, Awadh Ziad Awadh al-Salaima	Hebron	1977	December 17, 1993	1 life sentence	Relocation^{2} – Gaza / Abroad	?
Awada, Salah al-Din Taleb Jabar	Hebron	1970	April 14, 1993	1 life sentence	Relocation^{2} – Gaza / Abroad	?
Awadah, Ahmad Chalil Muhammad	Hebron	1966	December 14, 1999	23 years	Security Arrangement^{3} – West Bank	?
Awadh, Muhammad Salem Muhammad	Hebron	1985	May 4, 2005	1 life sentence	Relocation^{2} – Gaza / Abroad	?
Awana, Mona Jaud	Israel	1976	January 20, 2001	1 life sentence	Relocation^{2} – Turkey	lured over the internet the 16-year-old Israeli high school student Ofir Rahum, pretending to be a young American tourist, managed to drive him to a remote area in the outskirts of Ramallah where three Palestinian gunmen showed up and shot Rahum at close range.
Awd, Kamal Abd al-Rahman Arif	Nablus	1978	February 13, 2001	19 years	Relocation^{2} – Gaza / Abroad	Convicted of perpetrating an attempted bombing in Netanya in 2001 and participating in several shootings.
Awda, Abir Mahmud Hasan	Tulkarm	1982	July 9, 2009	Released prior to sentencing or conviction	Home^{1} – West Bank	?
Awdat, Ashraf Muhammad Yunis	Gaza	1979	November 4, 2003	1 life sentence	Home^{1} – Gaza	?
Awwad, Muhammad Issam Muhammad	West Bank	1979	November 19, 2002	1 life sentence	Home^{1} – West Bank	?
Awwad, Ziyad Hassan Khalil	Hebron	1971	April 10, 2000	27 years	Security Arrangement^{3} – West Bank	Initially convicted of murdering Palestinians who had collaborated with Israel, Awwad was re-arrested in 2014 for shooting at civilian vehicles traveling on a road near Hebron. A police official was killed and two children were injured. In July, 2014, Israeli forces demolished Awwad's house.
Ayida, Zaher Suleiman Salem	Gaza	unknown	January 7, 1990	30 years	Home^{1} – Gaza	?
Ayidi, Hazem Ali Salam	Gaza	1967	October 28, 1991	4 life sentences	Home^{1} – Gaza	?
Az al-Din, Tarek Ibrahim Muhammad	Jenin	1974	June 19, 2002	1 life sentence	Relocation^{2} – Gaza / Abroad	?
Badarina, Mustafa Kamil Yusuf	Ramallah	1964	February 13, 2003	30 years	Home^{1} – West Bank	?
Badarina, Sa'id Mahmud Yusuf	Jenin	1970	April 16, 1994	5 life sentences	Relocation^{2} – Abroad	?
Badawi, Alaa Khaled Ibrahim	Bethlehem	1980	February 28, 2003	25 years	Relocation^{2} – Gaza / Abroad	?
Badawi, Musa Nazir Rubhi	Gaza	1979	May 1, 2002	26 years	Home^{1} – Gaza	?
Badran, Husam Atif All	Nablus	1966	August 11, 1992	17 years, 8 months	Relocation^{2} – Abroad	the former head of Hamas' military wing in the West Bank, who orchestrated the 2001 Dolphinarium discotheque suicide bombing, 2001 Sbarro restaurant suicide bombing (15 killed, more than 100 injured) and in the 2002 Passover massacre.
Bahit, Ismail Musa Hussein	Gaza	1973	April 11, 1993	12 life sentences	Home^{1} – Gaza	Popular Resistance Committee member who killed six Palestinians he believed to be collaborating with Israel. Attempted to kill four others. Killed one Israeli civilian in a terrorist attack.
Balanwah, Shadi Talaat Awad	Tulkarm	1984	June 25, 2003	22 years	Relocation^{2} – Gaza / Abroad	?
Baluji, Ahsraf Hassan Yusuf	Gaza	1972	July 2, 1991	3 life sentences	Home^{1} – Gaza	?
Balut, Muhammad Abd al-Latif Ahmed	Ramallah	1979	September 22, 2003	22 years	Relocation^{2} – Gaza / Abroad	?
Bani jame, Jihad Muhammad Abd- Al-hadi	Gaza	1968	February 14, 1991	25 years	Home^{1} – West Bank	?
Bardini, Tayasir Salam Mansur	Gaza	1969	November 29, 1993	1 life sentence	Home^{1} – Gaza	?
Barghal, Makhlas Ahmed Muhammad	Israel	1962	September 11, 1987	40 years	Home^{1} – Israel	Convicted of involvement in a failed plot to attack a bus in Tel Aviv in 1987.
Barghuti, Faher Asfur Abdallah	Ramallah	1954	June 23, 1978	1 life sentence	Home^{1} – West Bank	Member of a militant cell that kidnapped and killed an Israeli.
Barghuti, Na'al Salah Abdullah	Ramallah	1957	April 4, 1978	1 life sentence	Security Arrangement^{3} – West Bank	Longest-serving Palestinian prisoner. Convicted of murdering an Israeli security officer.
Barik, Sanabil Nabigh Yusuf	Nablus	1989	September 22, 2008	3 years, 4 months	Home^{1} – West Bank	?
Barkat, Muhammad Naif Muhammad	Tulkarm	1979	January 30, 2000	25 years	Home^{1} – West Bank	?
Basharat, Aiyad Muhammad Suleiman	Hebron	1983	November 4, 2002	25 years	Relocation^{2} – Gaza / Abroad	?
Basharat, Muhammad A'aref Muhammad	Nablus	1972	September 22, 1992	2 life sentences	Security Arrangement^{3} – West Bank	?
Basharat, Rabhi Suleiman Mahmud	Nablus	1977	November 9, 2003	1 life sentence	Relocation^{2} – Abroad	?
Basharat, Said Muhammad Said	Nablus	1978	March 6, 2002	4 life sentences	Relocation^{2} – Gaza / Abroad	?
Baz, Jamil Ismail Abdulqadr	Gaza	1958	July 20, 1991	1 life sentence	Home^{1} – Gaza	?
Berri, Husam Yussuf Mustafa	Jenin	1966	February 7, 2003	1 life sentence	Home^{1} – West Bank	?
Bisharat, Bilal Khalil Ahmad	Tubas	1981	June 1, 2002	20 years	Relocation^{2} – Gaza / Abroad – 3 years	?
Daamsah, Yihya Ibrahim Abd al-Hafez	Bethlehem	1962	August 7, 2002	1 life sentence	Relocation^{2} – Gaza / Abroad	took part in the coordination of several suicide attacks, including the Café Moment bombing
Daghusa, Nimr Ibrahim Nimr	Nablus	1969	May 29, 2003	25 years	Relocation^{2} – Abroad	?
Dahan, Muhammad Abdulfatah Hassan	Gaza	1972	November 4, 1993	3 life sentences	Home^{1} – Gaza	?
Dahashan, Munzir Sha'aban Halil	Gaza	1964	January 26, 1994	3 life sentences	Home^{1} – Gaza	?
Dahbur, Mahniud Ibrahim Muhammad	Nablus	1978	November 4, 2002	24 years	Relocation^{2} – Gaza / Abroad	?
Darbiya, Ra'id Muhammad Jamal	Gaza	1973	April 18, 2002	1 life sentence	Home^{1} – Gaza	?
Daud, Yasser Taysir Muhammad	East Jerusalem	1970	October 13, 1991	60 years	Home^{1} – Jerusalem	?
Dawa'a, Jiwasi Ziyad	Tulkarm	1979	June 7, 2002	3 life sentences	Home^{1} – West Bank	took part in the Netanya Market bombing by leading the suicide bomber to his destination
Dawib, Salem Ali Ibrahim	Bethlehem	1981	May 24, 2002	1 life sentence	Relocation^{2} – Gaza / Abroad	Convicted of assisting in a failed Hamas suicide bombing.
Dawud, Ibrahim Asad Ibrahim	Qalqiliya	1983	July 3, 2003	1 life sentence	Home^{1} – West Bank	?
Dhamra, Muhammad Awadh Tawfiq	Ramallah	1961	September 5, 2006	Released prior to sentencing or conviction	Home^{1} – West Bank	?
Dihliz, Nizar Khidr Muhammad	Gaza	1972	June 13, 2002	1 life sentence	Home^{1} – Gaza	?
Dirawi, Muhammad Ibrahim Ali	Gaza	1978	March 1, 2001	30 years	Home^{1} – Gaza	?
Diriya, Ahmed Ayad Muhammad	Bethlehem	1968	May 13, 2002	1 life sentence	Relocation^{2} – Gaza / Abroad	?
Douglas, Muhammad Waal Muhammad	Nablus	1979	April 9, 2001	15 life sentences	Relocation^{2} – Abroad	Took part in the execution of the Sbarro restaurant suicide bombing in a Jerusalem in August 2001 (15 killed, more than 100 injured).
Dudin, Musa Muhammad Salem	Hebron	1972	December 20, 1992	1 life sentence	Relocation^{2} – Abroad	?
Fajjam, Ahmed Suleiman Ahmed	Gaza	1974	May 31, 2002	5 life sentences	Home^{1} – Gaza	?
Falana, Ata Mahmud abd al-Rahman	Safa	1966	November 28, 1992	1 life sentence	Relocation^{2} – Gaza / Abroad	?
Fanunah, Wael Makin Abdallah	Gaza	1966	December 12, 1989	3 life sentences	Home^{1} – Gaza	?
Faqha, Mazen Muhammad Suleiman	Nablus	1979	May 8, 2002	9 life sentences	Relocation^{2} – Gaza / Abroad	Convicted of planning the 2002 Meron Junction Bus 361 attack (9 killed, 38 wounded).
Farr, Ayman Mustafa Halil	Gaza	1972	June 1, 1990	35 years	Home^{1} – Gaza	?
Fawakhiriya, Arif Khalid Yunis	West Bank	1965	April 24, 2002	28 years	Home^{1} – West Bank	Was re-arrested in May 2012.
Fayad, Hassan Ismayil Gasser	Gaza	1981	March 27, 2003	27 years	Home^{1} – Gaza	?
Fidhi, Fares Fawzi Salim	Nablus	1976	November 25, 2002	5 life sentences	Relocation^{2} – Gaza / Abroad	?
Gaidi, Khaled Matawa Muslem	Gaza	1965	December 24, 1986	2 life sentences	Home^{1} – Gaza	?
Ganem, Hudifa Rahsid Muhammad	Ramallah	1981	September 2, 2004	1 life sentence	Relocation^{2} – Gaza / Abroad	?
Gazzawi, Iman Muhammad	Nablus	1975	August 3, 2001	13 years	Home^{1} – West Bank	Gazzawi was arrested while carrying a bomb which, according to police, she planned to detonate in the Tel Aviv Central Bus Station
Ghanim, Abd al-Hadi Rafa	Gaza	1965	July 6, 1989	16 life sentences	Home^{1} – Gaza	The surviving perpetrator of the Tel Aviv Jerusalem bus 405 suicide attack, in which Ghanim seized the steering wheel of a crowded Egged commuter bus No. 405 and managed to pull the bus into a ravine near Qiryat Ye'arim, causing the bus to catch fire. Passengers who could not escape the bus were burned alive. (16 killed, 27 injured)
Ghanimat, Abd al-Rahman Ismail Abd al-Rahman	Surif near Hebron	1972	November 13, 1997	5 life sentences	Relocation^{2} – Gaza / Abroad	Hamas member convicted of firing a machine gun at cars near Beit Shemesh in 1996. Efrat and Yaron Ungar were killed in the attack and their infant son was injured.
Ghawadire, Mu'ammar Murshid Fayiz	Jenin	1983	November 27, 2003	1 life sentence	Home^{1} – West Bank	?
Hajabi, Mahmud Ibrahim Muhammad	Tulkarm	1979	September 20, 2002	1 life sentence	Relocation^{2} – Gaza / Abroad	?
Haleq, Raid Ahmed Salim	Gaza	1973	October 16, 1994	2 life sentences	Home^{1} – Gaza	?
Halifa, Farsan Mahmud Abdullah	Tulkarm	1983	April 17, 2003	24 years	Relocation^{2} – Gaza / Abroad	Farsan Halifa
Hamad, Ahmed Taleb Khadher Ahmed	Nablus	1979	March 18, 2002	29 years	Home^{1} – West Bank	?
Hamad, Majdi Ahmad Abd alrahim	Gaza	1965	December 26, 1991	6 life sentences	Home^{1} – Gaza	?
Hamada, Muhammad Ibrahim Musa	East Jerusalem	1977	August 15, 1997	33 years	Relocation^{2} – Gaza / Abroad	Convicted of planning a rocket attack on Teddy Stadium in Jerusalem
Hamada, Yasser Hassan Muhammad	Ramallah	1977	December 26, 2003	6 life sentences	Relocation^{2} – Gaza / Abroad	?
Hamaida, Nimr Raqi Jamaa	Ramallah	1975	December 20, 2003	6 life sentences	Relocation^{2} – Gaza / Abroad	According to Israel's Ministry of Foreign Affairs, Hamaida was a member of a Hamas cell operating out of Mizra'a Sharkiya. The cell was responsible for the April 2003 killing of Hikhmat Yassin, a Palestinian suspected of collaborating with Israel, a May 2003 shooting attack on an Israeli vehicle that left one Israeli, Gideon Lichterman, dead and two injured and an October 2003 attack that left three Israeli soldiers dead.
Hamaida, Rabia Khadher Muhammad	Ramallah	1977	December 20, 2003	5 life sentences	Relocation^{2} – Gaza / Abroad	According to Israel's Ministry of Foreign Affairs, Hamaida was a member of a Hamas cell operating out of Mizra'a Sharkiya. The cell was responsible for the April 2003 killing of Hikhmat Yassin, a Palestinian suspected of collaborating with Israel, a May 2003 shooting attack on an Israeli vehicle that left one Israeli, Gideon Lichterman, dead and two injured and an October 2003 attack that left three Israeli soldiers dead.
Hamed, Anwar Ahmad Abd Al-Chaleq	Gaza	1984	December 5, 2001	20 years	Home^{1} – Gaza	?
Hamed, Faraj Ahmed Abd al-Hamid	Ramallah	1976	January 4, 2004	3 life sentences	Relocation^{2} – Gaza / Abroad	According to Israel's Ministry of Foreign Affairs, Hamed was a member of a Hamas cell based in Silwad. This cell carried out a series of shooting attacks on Israeli vehicles, including a November 2002 attack in which Esther Gallia was killed, a June 2003 attack near Ofra in which Zvi Goldstein was killed and an August 2003 attack near Kafr Mayer in which Shalom Har-Melekh was killed.
Hamed, Khaled Abd al-Maz Zin al-Din Amar	Ramallah	1975	December 20, 2003	8 life sentences	Relocation^{2} – Gaza / Abroad	According to Israel's Ministry of Foreign Affairs, Hamed was a member of a Hamas cell based in Silwad. This cell carried out a series of shooting attacks on Israeli vehicles, including a November 2002 attack in which Esther Gallia was killed, a June 2003 attack near Ofra in which Zvi Goldstein was killed and an August 2003 attack near Kafr Mayer in which Shalom Har-Melekh was killed.
Hamid, Nidal Abdarrahim Muhammad	Ramallah	1982	June 4, 2004	1 life sentence	Relocation^{2} – Gaza / Abroad	?
Hanani, Ahmad abu al-Saud Abd Al-Razeq	Nablus	1956	May 23, 1987	2 life sentences	Relocation^{2} – Syria	?
Hanani, Ashraf Khalid Husain	Nablus	1981	July 17, 2006	27 years	Relocation^{2} – Gaza / Abroad	Convicted for carrying an explosive belt in Jerusalem's Old City in 2006.
Handi, Ibrahim Muhammad Sha'aban Ibrahim	Gaza	1980	July 26, 2006	11 years	Home^{1} – Gaza	?
Harasha, Aayid Mahmud [Muhammad] Khalil	Tulkarm	1965	October 16, 1989	1 life sentence	Security Arrangement^{3} – West Bank	?
Hariz, Salah Muhammad Yusuf	Ramallah	1960	August 22, 1986	1 life sentence	Home^{1} – West Bank	?
Harz, Muhammad Ali Muhammad	Gaza	1958	July 30, 1992	8 life sentences	Home^{1} – Gaza	?
Harz, Nafez Ahmed Taleb	Gaza	1955	November 25, 1985	1 life sentence	Home^{1} – Gaza	?
Hasayin, Tarek Ahmed Abd al-Karim	Qalqiliya	1977	March 11, 2003	1 life sentence	Relocation^{2} – Gaza / Abroad	Palestinian Islamic Jihad member who carried out the shooting attack on Highway 6 in June 2003, in which the seven-year-old girl Noam Leibowitz was killed.
Hasni, Muhammad abd Muhammad	Gaza	1960	March 4, 1986	30 years	Home^{1} – Gaza	?
Hassan, Ahmad Hasan Ahmad	Nablus	1969	November 22, 1992	30 years	Home^{1} – West Bank	?
Hassan, Muhammad Muhammad Shhada	Gaza	1956	October 13, 1987	3 life sentences	Home^{1} – Gaza	?
Hasuna, Shaaban Salim Abdallah	Gaza	1969	July 10, 1990	1 life sentence	Home^{1} – Gaza	?
Hijaz, Hisham Abd al-Qader Ibrahim	Ramallah	1975	December 20, 2003	10 life sentences	Relocation^{2} – Abroad	Hamas member who was involved in terrorist acts which claimed the lives of 10 people.
Hijaz, Yasser abd al-Qadr Ibrahim	Ramallah	1968	February 11, 1990	1 life sentence	Security Arrangement^{3} – West Bank	?
Hijazi, Ismail Abdallah Musa	East Jerusalem	1981	October 16, 2007	1 life sentence	Home^{1} – Jerusalem	Hijazi was convicted of purchasing and importing weapons, and murder. He was rearrested during the 2014 Israel-Gaza conflict. Israeli authorities accused Hijazi of receiving funds from Hamas and maintaining contact with terrorists, in violation of his parole. He was ordered to serve the rest of his original sentence in prison.
Ibrahim, Abdalrahim Abdallatif Abdalrahim	Qalqiliya	1985	March 22, 2004	20 years	Security Arrangement^{3} – West Bank	?
Ibrahim, Fahim Ramadan Sirhan	Tulkarm	1968	June 20, 1989	1 life sentence	Home^{1} – West Bank	?
Ibtisam, Issawi Abd Faiz	East Jerusalem	1966	October 24, 2001	15 years	Home^{1} – Jerusalem	?
Idris, Mahmud Taleb Muhammad	East Jerusalem	1972	October 29, 1998	1 life sentence	Relocation^{2} – Gaza / Abroad	?
Iskafi, Zuhair Khairi Hashim	Hebron	1974	December 17, 2000	22 years	Security Arrangement^{3} – West Bank	?
Ismayil, Khatem Ibrahim abd al-Rahman	Gaza	1970	August 20, 1995	20 years	Home^{1} – Gaza	?
Ja'abri, Aliaa' Muhammad Yhya Jaadallah	Hebron	1979	February 15, 2011	1 year	Home^{1} – West Bank	?
Jabar, Hani Badawi Muhammad Said	East Jerusalem	1964	September 3, 1985	1 life sentence	Relocation^{2} – Abroad	?
Jabar, Hani Rasmi Abd al-Rahim	Hebron	1975	November 22, 1993	2 life sentences	Home^{1} – West Bank	Convicted of stabbing an Israeli seminary student to death in Kiryat Arba in 1993.
Jabar, Hitham Seif Mustafa Radhwan	Ramallah	1977	December 20, 2003	5 life sentences	Relocation^{2} – Gaza / Abroad	?
Jabarin, Muhammad Ahmed Tawfiq	Israel	1965	October 6, 1988	30 years	Home^{1} – Israel	Convicted of killing a Palestinian who had collaborated with Israel.
Jaber, Ibrahim Fadel Naji	Hebron	unknown	September 1, 1982	1 life sentence	Home^{1} – West Bank	?
Jalad, Muayed Saada Saleh	Tulkarm	1972	November 27, 1994	19 years	Security Arrangement^{3} – West Bank	?
Jandal, Issam Salih All	East Jerusalem	1954	April 30, 1986	1 life sentence	Security Arrangement^{3} – Jerusalem	?
Jarad, Mazen Muhammad Ismail	Gaza	1973	April 30, 1993	1 life sentence	Home^{1} – Gaza	?
Jaradat, Mahmud Said Ahmad	Jenin	1963	October 17, 1989	1 life sentence	Home^{1} – West Bank	?
Jarar, Assam Muhammad Najah	Jenin	1973	June 22, 2002	1 life sentence	Relocation^{2} – Abroad	?
Jarar, Muhammad Najah Muhammad Ahmed	Jenin	1982	June 23, 2002	1 life sentence	Relocation^{2} – Abroad	?
Jarradat, Hilal Muhammad Ahmad	Jenin	1966	September 24, 1987	45 years	Relocation^{2} – Gaza / Abroad	?
Jawdah, Hasan Abd-Al-karim Hamed	Nablus	1960	August 9, 2002	15 years	Security Arrangement^{3} – West Bank	?
Jawwad, Ahmad Dib	Jenin	1982	July 1, 2002	20 years	Relocation^{2} – Gaza / Abroad – 3 years	?
Jefri, Hasan Yusef Mahmud	Ramallah	1971	March 2, 1990	1 life sentence	Security Arrangement^{3} – West Bank	?
Jibril, Jibril Ismail Jibril	Qalqiliya	1979	December 12, 2002	2 life sentences	Relocation^{2} – Gaza / Abroad	?
Jibril, Zaher Ali Musa	Salfit	1968	January 4, 1993	1 life sentence	Relocation^{2} – Abroad	Hamas member who helped found the Hamas military wing in the West Bank. Convicted of killing Israeli soldier Giti Avishar in 1993. Considered one of the leaders of the Hamas prisoners. According to Haaretz, Jibril expressed opposition to any prisoner exchange that didn't include all of the most significant Palestinian prisoners and Israel placed Jibril and Yihye Sanwar in solitary confinement in order to prevent them from campaigning against the prisoner swap agreement.
Jidan, Haled Muhammad Mahmud	Ramallah	1962	August 25, 1995	2 life sentences	Security Arrangement^{3} – West Bank	?
Julani, Yusri Ibrahim Yusri	Hebron	1983	July 16, 2003	25 years	Security Arrangement^{3} – West Bank	?
Jundiya, Ibrahim Abd al-Rahman Muhammad	Bethlehem	1984	January 18, 2003	12 life sentences	Relocation^{2} – Gaza / Abroad	Participated in the planning of a 2002 suicide bombing that killed 11 Jerusalem bus passengers.
Kallab, Uwaida Muhammad Sulaiman	Gaza	1963	May 31, 1989	1 life sentence	Home^{1} – Gaza	?
Kamil, Muhammad Ahmed al-Haj	Jenin	1976	June 11, 1994	1 life sentence	Security Arrangement^{3} – West Bank	?
Kared, Bassem Muhammad Ashritah	Gaza	1968	July 31, 1992	8 life sentences	Home^{1} – Gaza	?
Kared, Tayir Mahmud Jamil	Gaza	1971	August 8, 1988	30 years, 6 months	Home^{1} – Gaza	?
Karsu, Muhammad Muhammad Husain	Gaza	1974	May 14, 2002	24 years, 6 months	Home^{1} – Gaza	?
Khattatiba, Zahir Wajih Ayash	Nablus	1976	September 26, 1994	22 years	Security Arrangement^{3} – West Bank	?
Khizran, Ayad Dhiab Ahmed Abu	West Bank	1971	October 3, 1991	1 life sentence	Relocation^{2} – Gaza / Abroad	?
Kilani, Muhammad Abd al-Rahman Radhwan Zayd	Nablus	1980	November 25, 2002	35 years	Relocation^{2} – Gaza / Abroad	?
Kiyal, Salim Ali Ibrahim	Gaza	1952	May 30, 1983	1 life sentence	Home^{1} – Gaza	?
Kraja, Samud	Ramallah	1988	October 25, 2009	Released prior to sentencing or conviction	Home^{1} – West Bank	Convicted of stabbing an Israeli soldier at a checkpoint.
Lanan, Abu Golmi Youssef	Nablus	1980	July 15, 2010	Released prior to sentencing or conviction	Home^{1} – West Bank	?
Luh, Jalal Kamel Halef	Gaza	1974	November 9, 1994	1 life sentence	Home^{1} – Gaza	?
Lui Muhammad Ahmed Awda	East Jerusalem	1978	April 6, 2002	28 years	Relocation^{2} – Gaza / Abroad	Tanzim member convicted of organizing a suicide bombing attempt in Jerusalem.
Lutfi Muhammad Hassan al-Darabiya	Hebron	1976	December 29, 1993	25 years	Security Arrangement^{3} – West Bank	?
Ma'ruf, Tal'at Mustafa Hasan	Beit Lahia	1968	April 26, 2008	Released prior to sentencing or conviction	Home^{1} – Gaza	?
Mabruk, Amir Ahmad Muhmmad	Tulkarm	1981	April 19, 2003	20 years	Relocation^{2} – Gaza / Abroad – 3 years	?
Madina, Ahsan Ali Muhammad	Nablus	1975	August 23, 2001	1 life sentence	Home^{1} – West Bank	?
Mahmud, Amal Fayiz Jum'a	Nablus	1969	May 10, 2004	11 years	Home^{1} – West Bank	arrested while planning to detonate a 15-kg bomb in Tel Aviv.
Mahrum, Samer Assam Sallam	Jenin	1966	January 12, 1986	1 life sentence	Home^{1} – West Bank	?
Makhamira, Khalid Musa Id Shahada	Hebron	1973	July 27, 2006	1 life sentence	Home^{1} – West Bank	A Fatah activist convicted of participating in shooting attacks, Makhamira left Fatah and joined Hamas while in prison. Makhamira was re-arrested in March 2012 and accused of smuggling money for use in terrorist activities.
Mallah, Muhammad Bassam Yusuf	Tulkarm	1980	March 9, 2002	22 years	Relocation^{2} – Abroad	?
Mansur, Akram Abd-Al-Aziz Said	Qalqiliya	1960	February 8, 1979	35 years	Home^{1} – West Bank	?
Mara'i, Salame Aziz Muhammad	Qalqiliya	1972	January 4, 1993	1 life sentence	Relocation^{2} – Abroad	?
Maragha, Adnan Muhammad Atta	East Jerusalem	1969	June 20, 1990	45 years	Home^{1} – Jerusalem	Maragha was convicted of the murder of a Palestinian suspected of collaborating with Israel. He was rearrested during the 2014 Israel–Gaza conflict. Israeli authorities accused Maragha of active participation in the Popular Front for the Liberation of Palestine and ordered him to serve out the remainder of his sentence.
Mardawi, Chaled Yusef Abd-Al-Rahman	Qalqiliya	1965	August 28, 1992	3 life sentences	Relocation^{2} – Gaza / Abroad – 3 years	?
Mardawi, Mahmud Mustafa Saleh	Qalqiliya	1968	August 28, 1992	3 life sentences	Relocation^{2} – Gaza / Abroad – 3 years	?
Masalme, Ismayil abd al Hadi abd Raba	Hebron	1960	December 14, 1999	27 years	Home^{1} – West Bank	?
Masri, Abdulaziz Muhammad Abdulaziz	Gaza	1972	February 4, 1993	3 life sentences	Home^{1} – Gaza	?
Masri, Ibrahim Yusef Abd Al-Halim	Ramallah	1971	September 23, 1995	2 life sentences	Security Arrangement^{3} – West Bank	?
Mataua, Muntesar Rabhi Hamadan	Nablus	1981	June 25, 2003	30 years	Relocation^{2} – Gaza / Abroad	?
Matawa, Asmat Abd al-Aziz Amar	Hebron	1976	April 29, 2002	2 life sentences	Relocation^{2} – Gaza / Abroad	?
Mishal, Ibrahim Abdalrazzaq Ahmad	East Jerusalem	1964	March 27, 1990	1 life sentence	Home^{1} – Jerusalem	?
Muhaisin, Khalid Ahmad Dawud	East Jerusalem	1965	April 30, 1986	1 life sentence	Home^{1} – Jerusalem	According to Muhaisin's family, he was convicted of shooting an intelligence officer to death and belonging to a terrorist group.
Muhammad, Nimr Sadqi Nimr al-Haj	Nablus	1963	August 28, 2006	35 years	Relocation^{2} – Gaza / Abroad	?
Muhammad, Samir Tariq Ahmad	East Jerusalem	1979	April 11, 2002	26 years	Home^{1} – Jerusalem	?
Muqbil, Amir Abd al-Rahman	Tulkarm	1983	April 16, 2003	21 years	Security Arrangement^{3} – West Bank	?
Muqdi, Mutasim Sabri Maslah	Tulkarm	1971	March 11, 1994	1 life sentence	Relocation^{2} – Abroad	?
Musa, Ibrahim Muhammad Yunus Dar	Ramallah	1982	September 14, 2004	17 years	Relocation^{2} – Gaza / Abroad	Distributed videotapes of two suicide bombers to the media in 2003. Convicted of having foreknowledge of the attacks. Also planned the Café Hillel bombing.
Musa, Imad Yasir Ata'	Jenin	1978	May 23, 1998	24 years, 8 months	Security Arrangement^{3} – West Bank	?
Musalah, Utman Ali Hamadan	Nablus	unknown	October 15, 1982	1 life sentence	Home^{1} – West Bank	?
Mushtahi, Ruhi Jamal Abd-Al-Nabi	Gaza	1959	February 13, 1988	4 life sentences	Home^{1} – Gaza	Hamas member. Cofounder of Al Majd, a predecessor of Hamas' military wing. Convicted of "murder through an act of terror, military exercises, manslaughter and incitement."
Musleh, Ayid Abdallah Abd-Al-Hadi	Gaza	1965	February 13, 1992	8 life sentences	Home^{1} – Gaza	?
Musulmani, Mustafa Mahmud Muhammad	Nablus	1964	November 1, 2001	2 life sentences	Relocation^{2} – Gaza / Abroad	Convicted of shooting to death two Israeli settlers in 2001.
Naasan, Majdi Muhammad Abdallah	Ramallah	1976	October 12, 2003	7 life sentences	Relocation^{2} – Gaza / Abroad	?
Nasser, Fawaz Mahmud Ali	Ramallah	1979	October 21, 2003	36 years	Relocation^{2} – Gaza / Abroad	?
Nawahida, Kifah Ahmad Amin	Jenin	1982	October 16, 2011	27 years, 7 months	Relocation^{2} – Gaza / Abroad	?
Nawfal, Lu'ayy Rajih Ahmad	Nablus	1973	May 25, 2001	1 life sentence	Security Arrangement^{3} – West Bank	?
Nawful, Hassan Mahmud Abd al-Rahim	Gaza	1971	August 9, 1988	30 years	Home^{1} – Gaza	?
Nazal, Nasser Abd al-Fatah Abdallah	Qalqiliya	1969	December 26, 2002	2 life sentences	Relocation^{2} – Gaza / Abroad	According to Israel's Ministry of Foreign Affairs, Nazal was the leader of Hamas' military wing in Qalqiliya and was involved in several suicide bombings.
Nazzal, Basim Muhammad Aqqad	Jenin	1965	September 16, 1992	1 life sentence	Relocation^{2} – Gaza / Abroad	?
Plit, Ahmed Ibrahim Ahmed	Gaza	1973	May 27, 1992	1 life sentence	Home^{1} – Gaza	?
Polishchyk, Iryna	Mykolaiv, Ukraine/West Bank	1977	May 23, 2002	20 years	Home^{1} – West Bank	Ukrainian citizen who came to Israel as an illegal immigrant, worked as a prostitute and married one of her johns, the Palestinian-Arab Ibrahim Sarahne. She was imprisoned for delivering a number of suicide bombers to their destinations. She was originally arrested with her husband. Sarahne remains in prison.
Qabha, Taher Rabhi Yussuf	Jenin	1970	April 22, 1994	30 years	Relocation^{2} – Gaza / Abroad	?
Qaflsha, Lu'ay Nafid Ismail	Hebron	1981	May 2, 2002	19 years	Relocation^{2} – Gaza / Abroad	?
Qahara, Al-Saadi Said Ali	Ramallah	1976	May 8, 2002	1 life sentence	Home^{1} – West Bank	participated in the King George Street bombing by leading the suicide bomber to his destination
Qaisi, Farid Muhammad Mahud	Gaza	1974	January 3, 1994	1 life sentence	Home^{1} – Gaza	?
Qanan, Ihab Hashem Muhammad [Fatan]	Gaza	1980	March 7, 2002	5 life sentences	Home^{1} – Gaza	?
Qapaisha, Alaa Muhammad Fayad	Hebron	1973	September 27, 2004	30 years	Relocation^{2} – Gaza / Abroad	?
Qapaisha, Ayman Muhammad Hussein	Hebron	1970	May 4, 1997	35 years	Relocation^{2} – Gaza / Abroad	?
Qaraush, Mustafa Mahmud Musa	Tulkarm	1954	March 10, 1986	1 life sentence	Home^{1} – West Bank	?
Qasim, Muhammad Salim Khalil	Gaza	1982	June 10, 2004	25 years	Home^{1} – Gaza	?
Qassem, Akram Abdullah Muhammad	Gaza	1976	April 3, 2002	27 years	Home^{1} – Gaza	?
Qawasme, Amar Ahmad Mahmud	Hebron	1966	January 22, 1988	1 life sentence	Home^{1} – West Bank	?
Qawasme, Muhammad Ali Hassan	Hebron	1980	October 26, 2004	20 years, 6 months	Relocation^{2} – Gaza / Abroad – 3 years	?
Qiq, Abd al-Rahman Fadel abd al-Rahman	Gaza	1963	December 18, 1986	1 life sentence	Home^{1} – Gaza	?
Rabi', Husain Ilyas Husain	Ramallah	1980	May 30, 2001	28 years	Relocation^{2} – Gaza / Abroad	?
Rabia, Yassin Suleiman Muhammad	Ramallah	1971	December 22, 2003	2 life sentences	Relocation^{2} – Gaza / Abroad	?
Rad'uan, Naif Yussuf Ibrahim	Ramallah	1973	September 23, 1995	2 life sentences	Security Arrangement^{3} – West Bank	?
Radi, Khidr Sulaiman Mahmud	Bethlehem	1979	March 27, 2003	20 years	Security Arrangement^{3} – West Bank	?
Rajbi, Adris Ahmad Muhammad	Hebron	1982	March 11, 2003	30 years	Relocation^{2} – Gaza / Abroad	carried out attacks in which 22 Israelis died.
Rajbi, Ala Hamdi Hamed	Hebron	1982	August 13, 2004	45 years	Relocation^{2} – Gaza / Abroad	?
Ramadan, Khuwailid Ismail Abd al-Jalil	Nablus	1978	October 20, 1998	2 life sentences	Relocation^{2} – Gaza / Abroad	Member of a Hamas cell that shot and killed Shlomo Liebman and Harel Bin-Nun, two Yeshiva students, as they were guarding a security fence at the Yitzhar settlement in the West Bank. The cell also planted several bombs.
Ramadan, Muhammad Salim Mahmud	Qalqiliya	1979	March 5, 2002	20 years	Relocation^{2} – Gaza / Abroad – 3 years	?
Ramadan, Mustafa Ali Hussein	Gaza	1973	August 17, 1994	3 life sentences	Home^{1} – Gaza	?
Ramadan, Nizar Muhammad Taysir	Nablus	1975	October 20, 1998	2 life sentences	Relocation^{2} – Abroad	ambushed and killed Harel Bin- Nun, 18, and Shlomo Liebman, 24, who were on patrol at the Yitzhar settlement
Riyan, Mansur Atef Hader	Nablus	1975	June 7, 1994	1 life sentence	Relocation^{2} – Gaza / Abroad	?
Ruma, Daragmeh Rawad Hussein	Jenin	1984	July 28, 2004	25 years	Home^{1} – West Bank	?
Sa'er, Ahmed Salam Hamdan	Gaza	1982	December 18, 2001	18 years	Home^{1} – Gaza	?
Saad, Mahmud Ghasub Mahmud	Ramallah	1985	December 20, 2003	7 life sentences	Relocation^{2} – Gaza / Abroad	According to Israel's Ministry of Foreign Affairs, Saad was a member of a Hamas cell operating out of Mizra'a Sharkiya. The cell was responsible for the April 2003 killing of Hikhmat Yassin, a Palestinian suspected of collaborating with Israel, a May 2003 shooting attack on an Israeli vehicle that left one Israeli, Gideon Lichterman, dead and two injured and an October 2003 attack that left three Israeli soldiers dead.
Sabaana, Jawad Taysir Hassan	Jenin	1981	August 22, 2002	9 life sentences	Relocation^{2} – Gaza / Abroad	?
Said, Akram Salamah Atiyah	Gaza	1979	February 25, 2002	24 years	Home^{1} – Gaza	?
Said, Ali Said Ahmad [Bilal]	Nablus	1980	unknown	25 years	Relocation^{2} – Gaza / Abroad	?
Sakhal, Nael Saadi Abd al-Fatah	Nablus	1977	April 15, 2003	1 life sentence	Relocation^{2} – Gaza / Abroad	?
Sakhla, Muhammad Abdallatif Muhammad	Gaza	1985	January 18, 2008	19 years	Home^{1} – Gaza	?
Sakik, Said Muhammad Aashur	Gaza	1973	November 3, 1993	3 life sentences	Home^{1} – Gaza	?
Salamah, Akram Abd Al-Rahman Husein	Gaza	1973	April 21, 1996	30 years	Home^{1} – Gaza	?
Saleh, Hamuda Said Abd al-Rahim	Nablus	1976	July 30, 2000	22 years	Relocation^{2} – Gaza / Abroad – 3 years	A Hamas member, Saleh was convicted of conspiracy to commit murder, planting a bomb, and committing a shooting. After his release he opened a pastry shop in Gaza with another former inmate.
Saleh, Yasser Muhammad	Ramallah	1980	September 29, 2005	7 years	Security Arrangement^{3} – West Bank	Hamas member who led the Hamas cell that was responsible for kidnapping and killing Israeli businessman Sasson Nuriel in 2005.
Salehi, Abd al-Aziz Yussuf Mustafa	Ramallah	1981	June 16, 2001	1 life sentence	Relocation^{2} – Gaza / Abroad	participant in the 2000 Ramallah lynching who was iconically photographed displaying his blood-stained hands to the Palestinian mob after having beaten to death an IDF reservist who had accidentally entered the Palestinian Authority-controlled city of Ramallah.
Salmi, Ziyad Salim Husni	Gaza	1974	unknown	1 life sentence	Home^{1} – Gaza	?
Sana'a, Sh'hadeh Muhammad Hussein	Israel	1975	May 24, 2002	1 life sentence	Home^{1} – Israel	participated in the King George Street bombing by leading the suicide bomber to his destination
Saqr, Jalal Lutfi Abd-Al-Nabi	Gaza	1963	August 4, 1992	4 life sentences	Home^{1} – Gaza	?
Sarim, Talal Ibrahim abd al-Rahman	Qalqiliya	1959	December 26, 2002	22 years	Relocation^{2} – Abroad	According to Israel's Ministry of Foreign Affairs, Sarim was the head of Hamas in Qalqiliya and was involved in several suicide bombings.
Sawafita, Samir Faisal	West Bank	1979	February 12, 2003	30 years	Relocation^{2} – Gaza / Abroad	Hamas member convicted of hiding an explosive belt and driving two attempted suicide bombers.
Sawalma, Amir Jabar Sharif	Nablus	1974	April 28, 2003	6 life sentences	Relocation^{2} – Gaza / Abroad	Perpetrated a shooting at an Israeli checkpoint in the West Bank, killing two Israeli soldiers and injuring three others. Planned two suicide bombings of Israeli troop positions which killed two soldiers and injured eight. Planned a suicide bombing of a civilian target, which led to the death of a security guard.
Sha'ablu, Kabel Sami Mustafa	Nablus	1973	March 13, 2003	25 years	Relocation^{2} – Gaza / Abroad	Convicted of involvement in a 2002 suicide bombing in Ariel, which resulted in three fatalities.
Shabbana, Abbas Abdallah	Hebron	1971	December 25, 1992	23 years, 5 months	Security Arrangement^{3} – West Bank	?
Shahatit, Randa Muhammad Yusuf	Hebron	1985	January 6, 2009	4 years, 2 months	Home^{1} – West Bank	?
Shahshir, Taha Aadel Saada	Nablus	1965	January 12, 1992	1 life sentence	Security Arrangement^{3} – West Bank	?
Shalabi, Hana	Jenin	1982	September 14, 2009	Released prior to sentencing or conviction	Home^{1} – West Bank	?
Shalalda, Said Ibrahim Muhammad	Ramallah	1986	December 7, 2005	1 life sentence	Relocation^{2} – Gaza / Abroad	Member of the Hamas cell responsible for kidnapping and killing Israeli businessman Sasson Nuriel in 2005.
Shalash, Ibrahim Abd Al-Aziz Shalash	Ramallah	1969	September 23, 1995	2 life sentences	Security Arrangement^{3} – West Bank	?
Shalbi, Kamal Muhammad Halil	Tulkarm	1980	June 5, 2003	25 years	Relocation^{2} – Abroad	?
Shamasna, Mansur Yusef Hasan	Ramallah	1970	March 24, 1996	1 life sentence	Security Arrangement^{3} – West Bank	?
Shammasina, Ibrahim Sulaim Mahmud	Ramallah	1964	December 29, 1993	3 life sentences	Relocation^{2} – Abroad	took part in the murder of Israeli boys Ronen Kramni and Lior Tuboul, taxi driver Rafi Doron and soldier Yehushua Friedberg. Shammasina was deported to Qatar.
Shaqir, Abd al-Latif Ismayil Ibrahim	Tulkarm	1957	July 23, 1986	1 life sentence	Home^{1} – West Bank	?
Shaqirat, Nasir Hamidan Ali	East Jerusalem	1971	March 22, 1993	82 years	Relocation^{2} – Gaza / Abroad	?
Shashaniyah, Zuhir Salah Anis	Gaza	1967	September 22, 1990	1 life sentence	Home^{1} – Gaza	?
Shawamra, Naif Hussein Muhammad	Hebron	1958	March 14, 1995	2 life sentences	Home^{1} – West Bank	?
Sheor, Mahdi Omar Muhammad	Hebron	1974	May 23, 2002	21 years	Relocation^{2} – Gaza / Abroad – 3 years	?
Shibli, Rabi' Samir Rajih	Ramallah	1980	May 31, 2005	27 years	Home^{1} – West Bank	?
Shihab, Abd-Al-Rahman Rabi Abd-Al-Rahman	Gaza	1968	May 9, 1989	35 years	Home^{1} – Gaza	?
Shukhaidim, Nidal Akram Rajab Abu	Hebron	1982	February 28, 2008	1 life sentence	Relocation^{2} – Gaza / Abroad	?
Shukri, Ahmed Hussein Mahmud	Ramallah	1963	September 9, 1989	50 years	Security Arrangement^{3} – West Bank	?
Shurbagi, Omar Muhammad Ahmed	Gaza	1980	July 15, 2003	1 life sentence	Home^{1} – Gaza	?
Slamah, Hasan Ali Nimer	Ramallah	1958	August 8, 1982	1 life sentence	Home^{1} – West Bank	?
Stut, Mamun Ismyail Salame	Tulkarm	1974	April 17, 2003	25 years	Relocation^{2} – Gaza / Abroad	Convicted of involvement in a 2002 bombing in Beersheva as well as several shootings. After being released, Stut was rearrested in January, 2011, with the IDF claiming that he posed a security threat. Stut is the first prisoner to be rearrested.
Suleiman, Taysir Muhammad Hamdan	East Jerusalem	1973	September 28, 1993	1 life sentence	Relocation^{2} – Abroad	Suleiman, a Hamas operative, was convicted of the kidnapping and Killing of Yaron Chen. Suleiman was sent to Turkey after his release.
Ta'ma, Abd-Al-Munem Uthman Muhammad	Tulkarm	1969	October 28, 1989	1 life sentence	Security Arrangement^{3} – West Bank	?
Tabanja, Salim Rashid Rajib	Nablus	1984	February 17, 2003	20 years	Relocation^{2} – Gaza / Abroad – 3 years	?
Tah, Barake Rajah Abd al-Mokhsen	Hebron	1981	August 14, 2004	34 years	Security Arrangement^{3} – West Bank	?
Taha, Chaled Rajeh Abd Al-Muhsen	Hebron	1987	August 30, 2004	16 years	Relocation^{2} – Gaza / Abroad – 3 years	?
Taha, Khalid Muhammad Shafiq	East Jerusalem	1965	unknown	1 life sentence	Relocation^{2} – Gaza / Abroad	?
Tamimi, Ahlam Aref Ahmad	Jordan	1980	September 14, 2001	16 life sentences	Home^{1} – Jordan	Was recruited by the Hamas, posed as a tourist, and took part in the execution of the Sbarro restaurant suicide bombing in a Jerusalem in August 2001 (15 killed, more than 100 injured).
Taqatqa, Muhammad Musa Hussein Muhammad	Bethlehem	1971	September 21, 1993	1 life sentence	Relocation^{2} – Gaza / Abroad	According to The New York Times, Taqatqa was convicted of "murder by terror operation, military training, attempted murder and membership in an unregistered organization". Taqatqa acknowledged that he was a Hamas militant and had participated in attacks on Israelis.
Tarabin, Miryam Salim	Jericho	1986	January 24, 2005	8 years, 2 months	Home^{1} – Gaza	?
Tarahan, Jamil Khamis Muhammad	Gaza	1958	August 16, 1993	6 life sentences	Home^{1} – Gaza	?
Udah, Shadi Saleh Mahmud	Qalqiliya	1982	August 2, 2002	23 years	Home^{1} – West Bank	?
Ulayyan, Ibrahim Husain Aliyy	East Jerusalem	1964	February 8, 1987	1 life sentence	Relocation^{2} – Gaza / Abroad	?
Utman, Muhammad Mustafa Ali	Gaza	1973	June 27, 1996	2 life sentences	Home^{1} – Gaza	?
Wavi, Ashraf Gazi Mahmud	Tulkarm	1973	November 9, 1993	2 life sentences	Home^{1} – West Bank	?
Wazuz, Musa Ibrahim Fahed	Hebron	1982	January 21, 2006	8 life sentences	Relocation^{2} – Gaza / Abroad	Member of a four-person group that carried out a series of attacks including the June 2005 murders of Aviad Mantzour and Avichai Levy at a bus stop near Beit Haggai, a July 2005 shooting attack on Israeli soldiers in Hebron which left an Arab passerby dead, the October 2005 murders of Matat Rosenfeld Adler, Kinneret Mandel and Oz Meir and the December 2005 killing of Yossi Shok.
Yaghmur, Jihad Muhammad Shaker	East Jerusalem	1967	October 14, 1994	1 life sentence	Relocation^{2} – Abroad	took part in the murder of Nachshon Wachsman. Originally sentenced to life imprisonment.
Yassin, Shadi Yassin Mahmud	Tulkarm	1977	March 9, 2002	32 years	Relocation^{2} – Gaza / Abroad	?
Yunes, Sami Khaled Salame	Israel	1932	January 5, 1983	40 years	Home^{1} – Israel	Convicted of involvement in the 1980 kidnapping and murder of Israeli soldier Avi Bromberg.
Yusif, Yasir Talal Ali	Gaza	1979	March 27, 2006	25 years	Home^{1} – Gaza	?
Za'areb, Imad al-Din Ata Qassam	Gaza	1973	April 11, 1993	1 life sentence	Home^{1} – Gaza	?
Zaid, Yakub Adnan Ishmail	Jenin	1979	March 1, 2000	16 years	Security Arrangement^{3} – West Bank	?
Zaidan, Zaidan Muhammad Said Nimr	Jenin	1983	June 19, 2002	1 life sentence	Relocation^{2} – Gaza / Abroad	?
Zakut, Maher Humis Abdulmaati	Gaza	1966	October 29, 1993	3 life sentences	Home^{1} – Gaza	?
Zakut, Muhammad Abdul-Rahman Muhammad	Gaza	1963	March 21, 1989	1 life sentence	Home^{1} – Gaza	Tel Aviv construction worker who stabbed three Israelis, murdering two, on the holiday of Purim, March 21, 1989.
Zakzuk, Fahed Sabhi Masud	Gaza	1975	September 30, 1992	3 life sentences	Home^{1} – Gaza	?
Zalum, Nidal Abd al-Razzaq Izzat	Ramallah	1964	March 5, 1989	2 life sentences	Security Arrangement^{3} – West Bank	Convicted of murder, conspiracy, attempted murder and attacking a civil servant in a 1989 stabbing attack in Jerusalem. Two Israelis were killed in the attack and three wounded.
Zara'a, Bilal Ismail Muhammad	Kafr Ni'ma	1980	February 16, 2004	1 life sentence	Relocation^{2} – Gaza / Abroad	?
Zard, Marwan Muhammad Mustafa	Gaza	1975	February 10, 1993	3 life sentences	Home^{1} – Gaza	?
Zawidi, Hamdi Amin Muhammad	Gaza	1972	unknown	1 life sentence	Home^{1} – Gaza	?
Zayid, Hamza Naif Hassan	Jenin	1966	January 22, 1986	1 life sentence	Relocation^{2} – Gaza / Abroad	?
Zaytawi, Abdullah Muhammad Mahmud	Nablus	1975	August 23, 2001	1 life sentence	Relocation^{2} – Gaza / Abroad	?
Zeid, Hassan Yussuf Hassan	Jenin	1983	April 29, 2003	1 life sentence	Relocation^{2} – Gaza / Abroad – 3 years	?
Ziada, Muhammad Mansur Abd al-Majid	Israel	1954	September 10, 1987	1 life sentence	Home^{1} – Israel	Convicted of involvement in a failed plot to bomb a bus in Tel Aviv in 1987.
Ziyada, Sharif Hussein Rashid	Gaza	1971	October 6, 2005	2 life sentences	Home^{1} – Gaza	?

Notes

Home – means the prisoner will be returned to their homeland and, if their destination is the West Bank or Jerusalem, will be allowed to travel within those areas.
Security Arrangement – means the prisoner's movement will be restricted, and they will be required to report to the Israeli military once a month.
Relocation – means the prisoner will not be returned home, but rather deported to Gaza or to a foreign country. Deportation period will either be 3 years or indefinitely. A total of 42 prisoners have been relocated abroad: 16 to Syria, 15 to Qatar and 11 to Turkey.
Destination – The "destination" for each prisoner is determined by the Israeli government.

== Second phase: 550 prisoners released in December 2011 ==
The 550 remaining prisoners were released in December 2011. Israel alone determined the list of prisoners to be released, though in consultation with Egypt. The list consisted of 300 Fatah prisoners, 50 PFLP members, and 20 DFLP members, with the rest having no political affiliation. According to Israeli criteria, none of those selected for release had "blood on their hands".

== See also ==
- Gilad Shalit prisoner exchange
- Israeli prisoner exchanges
- 2008 Israel–Hezbollah prisoner exchange
- Jibril Agreement
- Pidyon Shvuyim
