= Bhamdoun abduction operation =

Israeli–Palestinian engagement during the 1982 Lebanon War

- Part of the 1982 Lebanon War and the Lebanese Civil War
Date	4 September 1982
Location	IDF observation post north of Bhamdoun
Result	Palestinian victory

Belligerents
Israel	Palestine Liberation Organization

Commanders and leaders
(Israel) Sgt. Reuven Cohen (Squad Commander) (Israel) Brig. Gen. Haim Oren (Commander of Nahal Bde.)	Issa Hajjou (Squad Commander) Mahmoud al-Aloul (Commander of al-Jarmaq Bn.)

Strength
8 IDF soldiers from Nahal Brigade	4 fighters from Fatah al-Jarmaq battalion

Casualties and losses
8 soldiers captured	No casualties

The Bhamdoun abduction operation was a military operation carried out by Fatah, the main constituent organization of the PLO. During the Israeli invasion of Lebanon in 1982, a Palestinian four-man squad infiltrated the IDF-held mountainous area north of Bhamdoun, in central Lebanon, and attacked an IDF observation point, capturing the entire 8-men IDF unit without firing a single bullet. The Palestinian squad took eight Israeli soldiers as prisoners. This provided the Palestinian side with plenty of leverage in the two controversial prisoner exchanges with Israel, which freed 5,900 Palestinian and Lebanese prisoners.

== Background ==
The prisoners captured in Bhamdoun were not the first to be exchanged for Palestinian prisoners in Israeli jails. Shmuel Rosenwasser, a watchman abducted by Fatah in a raid on Metulla in northern Israel in 1970, was freed in exchange for Fatah operative Mahmoud Hijazi sentenced to 30 years in prison in Israel.

During the 1978 South Lebanon conflict, an IDF soldier, Avraham Amram, was captured by the Popular Front for the Liberation of Palestine – General Command (PFLP-GC) in a clash outside Rashidieh, a refugee camp in south Lebanon. He was released the following year for 76 Palestinian prisoners in Israeli jails. The exchange was criticised as extremely "lopsided" and it was feared the agreement would set a precedent for breaking Israel's firm policy of no deals with terrorist organizations."

Fatah also held two Israeli prisoners at the time of the evacuation of Palestinian forces from West Beirut in August 1982. Capt. Aharon Achiaz was an Israeli Air Force Skyhawk pilot shot down during the battle of Beaufort on the first day of the war. He was later transported to Beirut. Pvt. Ron Harush was an IDF soldier captured during the siege of West Beirut. Both were released as part of the deal of the evacuation of PLO from Beirut. No Palestinian prisoners were released in exchange.

Unknown at the time, PFLP-GC held another Israeli prisoner in Damascus. Pvt. Hezi Shai was captured in the Battle of Sultan Yacoub, June 10, 1982, in which Syrian army forces also captured two IDF soldiers. Shai and three other soldiers were declared missing in action.

== The operation ==
After the Israeli occupation of south Lebanon and the evacuation of the Palestinian forces from Beirut in August 1982, Fatah, the main constituent of the PLO still had forces in east and north Lebanon. One of their more pressing concerns was the many thousands of Palestinian and allied Lebanese prisoners held by Israel, mainly in the vast Ansar camp in the Nabatiya district of south Lebanon. Palestinian forces were therefore ordered to concentrate their efforts on capturing IDF prisoners to be used in future prisoner swaps.

Palestinian intelligence found a suitable target in an isolated IDF observation post on a hill side in a heavily forested area between the Israeli-controlled town of Bhamdoun and the Syrian-held Hammana area. The observation post was accessible only by a steep climb on foot. Apparently, the Palestinians had a well-camouflaged position directly below the Israeli post.

The Israeli observation post was manned by eight IDF soldiers from the newly formed Nahal Brigade. Four of the soldiers were on active duty, while the remaining four were resting (or sleeping according to some accounts). Due to the thick undergrowth, the Israeli soldiers had very poor visibility and could not even observe each other.

A four-man squad of Fatah fighters from the elite al-Jarmaq battalion, led by commander Eisa Hajjou, were selected for the mission. They were dressed in uniforms similar to those worn by Israel-allied Lebanese Forces fighters and also carried the same type of guns (East German AK-47's).

The attack took place on the afternoon of 4 September 1982, after a period of observation of IDF routines. The Fatah commander Hajjou walked alone straight into the Israeli position, speaking French to and shaking hands with Sgt. Reuven Cohen, the Israeli officer. Then suddenly he pointed his gun at the Israeli officer, forcing him to surrender. Meanwhile, the other members of the Fatah unit sneaked up behind the remaining Israeli soldiers. The other Israeli soldiers walked unwittingly into the trap and realizing only too late the seriousness of their situation. The Israeli soldiers had kept their guns loaded but not cocked, making any armed response too slow and extremely dangerous. Sgt. Cohen ordered his men to lay down their arms, and one by one they complied. All the eight IDF soldiers surrendered without firing a single bullet.

The four-man Fatah squad apparently had not expected such a success and had not prepared evacuation vehicles for so many prisoners. The Israeli prisoners were stripped of all their ammunition but were allowed to keep their personal weapons, so the company would appear, from a distance, to be a joint IDF-Lebanese Forces patrol.

They had to march for several hours through the thick vegetation, undetected by all sides, across the ceasefire line. During the walk, one of the Palestinian fighters accidentally fired his gun, wounding one of the Israeli prisoners in the shoulder. The Fatah fighters were also nervous of losing their prisoners to the Syrian army. The Fatah squad contacted a PFLP-GC position nearby for help with the logistics. The pro-Syrian PFLP-GC were considered to have more freedom of movement in the Syrian-held part of eastern Lebanon. The PFLP-GC obliged and transported the Fatah men and their prisoners out of harm's way. According to the deal PFLP-GC could keep two of the eight prisoners for themselves. In the Biqaa valley, the six remaining Fatah prisoners were handed over to al-Jarmaq battalion commander Mahmoud al-Aloul, who is presently the Vice-President of the Palestinian Authority. (Note: Israeli and Palestinian accounts generally agree on what happened that day in Bhamdoun. Israeli right-wing activist and author Samuel Katz, however, presents a completely different story. According to him, the IDF soldiers were captured by "approximately one dozen PFLP-GC shock troops". Six of the eight prisoners were then "mysteriously... handed over to Fatah". Why the PFLP-GC acted in this way remains, according to Katz, "a mystery to this day".)

The two prisoners taken by PFLP-GC were quickly transferred to Damascus. The six prisoners still held by Fatah were hidden almost a year, in a small area near the town of Chtaura in the Biqaa valley. The Fatah commanders feared that either the Israelis or the Syrians would discover their whereabouts.

== The Fatah agreement ==
Fatah quickly announced its four demands:

1. The release of all the prisoners in the prison camps and prisons in Lebanon (Ansar, Nabatiyeh, Sidon, and Tyre).
2. The release of 100 Palestinian prisoners from Israeli prisons.
3. Return of the confiscated archives of the Palestine Research Center.
4. The release of passengers and crew of the two ships Cordela and Hanan seized by Israel.

Israel initially rejected these demands and insisted on a joint deal also involving the two Israeli prisoners held by PFLP-GC. Israel was still unaware of the PFLP-GC was holding a third prisoner. The indirect negotiations were then conducted with Austria and the International Committee of the Red Cross acting as mediators. Fatah declared that they had no influence over PFLP-GC and thus could not negotiate on its behalf. For more than a year the negotiations did not move forward.

In October 1983 Israel quickly switched position, due the drastic decline in the security situation for the Israeli prisoners. A pro-Syrian rebellion broke out inside the Fatah movement in east Lebanon, calling itself Fatah al-Intifada. The aim of the revolt was to depose the leadership of Fatah and the PLO, headed by Yassir Arafat.

Fatah commanders realized that the six Israeli prisoners could not remain in the Biqaa valley. They were therefore smuggled out, one by one, through Syrian check points, to the northern port city of Tripoli, where Fatah’s position was somewhat better.

The Fatah rebels received massive support from the Syrian army and from Pro-Syrian Palestinian forces, including the PFLP-GC. Arafat loyalist forces were gradually pushed out of most of eastern and northern Lebanon and soon found themselves besieged in Tripoli. Negotiations continued with bullets literally flying and grenades exploding over the heads of the Israeli prisoners.

Finally, an agreement was reached November 23, 1983, where Israel agreed to most of the Palestinian demands. All the 4,600 prisoners held in prisons in Lebanon would be released, including several high-ranking PLO commanders. 1,024 of the released prisoners choose to go to Algeria, while the rest choose to return to their towns, villages and camps in Lebanon. 65 prisoners would be released from Israeli jails, including 52 with life sentences. The archives of the Palestine Research Center would be returned.

== Jibril agreement ==
The PFLP-GC eventually disclosed its possession of the third prisoner. Since all of the Palestinian prisoners in Lebanon already had been freed by the Fatah agreement, The PFLP-GC focused on Palestinians in Israeli jails. On May 21, 1985, the Jibril Agreement was finally concluded. Israel agreed to free 1150 Palestinian prisoners from Israeli jails.

== Aftermath and reactions ==
PLO veteran Shafiq al-Hout described in his memoirs the two agreements as "the largest prisoner exchange in the history of the Arab–Israeli conflict" and "a day of national celebration in Lebanon" and that "smiles returned for the first time since June 1982".

In contrast, many Israelis felt humiliated by the behaviour of the eight Nahal brigade soldiers, all surrendering without firing a single bullet. The price of 5,900 prisoners – many of whom "with Israeli blood on their hands" - for nine Israeli soldiers was also considered "lopsided" by many Israelis.

The behaviour of the eight Bhamdoun captives was rebuked by many Israeli commentators. It was deemed "unacceptable" by IDF Chief of Staff Moshe Levy. Nahal Brigade Commander Yoram Gilboa went as far as branding the soldiers of his own brigade as "eight cowards". Likud Knesset Member Pinchas Goldstein called for the soldiers to be court martialed.

One of the Bhamdoun prisoners, Rafael ('Rafi') Hazan, however, strongly defended the soldiers’ behaviour, shifting the blame to their superior officers. The soldiers had not been informed of the proximity of Palestinian positions. An aggravating circumstance was that the Israeli soldiers, per instruction, had their Galil assault rifles loaded but not cocked. This drastically slowed down any potential armed response from the Israeli side. The fact that the four off-duty soldiers were sleeping did not contravene given orders. Hazan also claimed that four of the eight IDF soldiers should never have been placed on a frontline position. Two of the soldiers had been drafted after the breakout of the war and had thus not even completed basic training. They had never fired a MAG machine gun or thrown a hand grenade. One of the soldiers had dropped out of a squad-leader course and then only completed a medics course. He was sent to the front line without any operational experience. A fourth soldier was still suffering from previous shrapnel wounds.

== IDF Prisoners ==
Held by Fatah:

- Sgt. Reuven Cohen, 21
- Pvt. Danny Gilboa, aged 20
- Pvt. Avraham Mindvelsky, 19
- Pvt. Eliahu Abutbul, 20
- Pvt. Rafael Hazan, 21
- Pvt. Avraham Kronenfeld, 20

Held by PFLP-GC:

- Pvt. Yosef Grof
- Pvt. Nissim Salem
- Pvt. Hezi Shai (captured in the battle of Sultan Yacoub)

== See also ==
- List of Arab–Israeli prisoner exchanges
