= Zechariah Baumel =

American-Israeli soldier in the Israel Defense Forces

- זכריה באומל
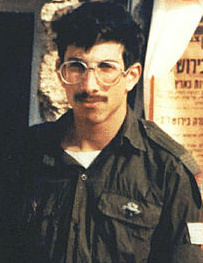
- Born: 17 November 1960; Brooklyn, New York, US
- Died: 1982 (age 22)
- Burial place: Yarmouk Camp, Syria (prior to April 2019); Mount Herzl, Jerusalem (since April 2019)
- Other name: Zachary Baumel
- Military career
- Allegiance: Israel Defense Forces
- Branch: Army
- Rank: Sergeant
- Commands: Tank commander
- Conflicts: 1982 Lebanon war Battle of Sultan Yacoub (MIA) (executed)

Zechariah Baumel (Hebrew: זכריה באומל; 17 November 1960 – 1982), also known as Zachary Baumel, was an American-Israeli soldier in the Israel Defense Forces. On the night of 10–11 June 1982, during the Battle of Sultan Yacoub in the 1982 Lebanon War, his unit was attacked and he and five other comrades were declared missing. One had been killed and was later found buried in Syria, and two were located alive in Syria and returned to Israel a few years later. But Baumel and two others (Feldman and Katz) remained unaccounted for. Until his death in 2009, Baumel's father Yona kept his son's case in the public eye, traveling around the world to uncover leads to verify the persistent rumors that his son was still alive, and criticizing the Israeli army for not pursuing the case vigilantly.

On 3 April 2019, Russian President Vladimir Putin announced that the Russian army, in coordination with the Syrian military, had found Baumel's remains. The military operation was a result of a two-year cooperative effort between Israel and Russia to return bodies of missing Israeli soldiers buried in Syrian territory formerly controlled by ISIL; the operation was code-named Operation Bittersweet Song (Hebrew: זמר נוגה, romanized: Zemer Noogge) after a poem by Rachel Bluwstein. Baumel's remains were handed over to Israeli Prime Minister Benjamin Netanyahu in an official ceremony at the Russian defense ministry in Moscow on 3 April and interred the following day at the Mount Herzl military cemetery in Jerusalem. Feldman's remains were recovered in a Mossad Operation on May 11, 2025, while Katz's remains were recovered on August 18, 2026.

== Early life and family ==
Zechariah Baumel was born on November 17, 1960, in Brooklyn, New York, the son of Yona and Miriam Baumel. He was the youngest of three children. As a youth, he attended the Hebrew Institute of Boro Park. In 1970 he, his parents, and siblings immigrated to Israel, settling in the Kiryat Motzkin suburb of Haifa. He studied at a state religious school and advanced to Midreshiat No'am High School in Pardes Hanna.

After high school graduation, Baumel enrolled in the hesder program at Yeshivat Har Etzion, a program that combines yeshiva studies with army service.

== Military career ==
Baumel served as a tank commander in the Israel Defense Forces (IDF). Close to the end of his military service Baumel was involved in the Battle of Sultan Yacoub in the 1982 Lebanon War. Serving in the 362nd Battalion, Baumel was assigned as the driver in a tank alongside gunner Arik Lieberman, communications operator Zvi Feldman, and commanding officer Hezi Shai. On the night of June 10–11, 1982, his tank was hit and the crew abandoned it. After the battle, Baumel, Lieberman, Feldman, and Shai, as well as two soldiers from a different tank, were reported as missing in action.

Later on the day of the battle, Western journalists from Time, Associated Press, and La Stampa, as well as Syrian media sources, reported that three Israeli soldiers and their tank were paraded through Damascus in a "victory march". However, the images from this event were too blurry to verify the participants. A few weeks after the incident, Syria announced it had interred four bodies in a Jewish cemetery; however, the exhumation of the graves by the Red Cross in 1983 turned up only one Israeli soldier reported missing from the battle, who was returned to Israel, and three Arabs. Lieberman, who had been taken to Syria, was returned to Israel in a prisoner exchange on June 23, 1984, while Shai had been captured by the Popular Front for the Liberation of Palestine – General Command and taken to Syria, where he was discovered two years later and returned to Israel in a prisoner exchange in 1985.

IDF intelligence officers concluded that Baumel, Feldman, and Yehuda Katz, another soldier in the battalion, had been killed in the battle and buried in temporary graves in Lebanon, and that the bodies were subsequently reinterred in the Martyrs' Cemetery in the Yarmouk refugee camp. Fatah leader Abu Jihad stated to reporters on numerous occasions that his men had buried the bodies of the missing Israeli soldiers. The families of the missing soldiers, however, believed they were still alive. In the decades following Baumel's disappearance, his father Yona traveled around the world to uncover leads and interview "hundreds of witnesses and informants" to verify the persistent rumors that his son was still alive. Prior to the signing of the Oslo Accords in 1993, Yasser Arafat handed over to Israel half of Baumel's dog tag and claimed that he had more information as to Baumel's whereabouts; he later declined to give more details. Israeli intelligence officers believed that the dog tag had been removed from Baumel's body by a Palestinian doctor who assisted in the burial of the fallen soldiers right after the battle. Yet as late as 2005, the elder Baumel met with people in Syria who said they had visited his son that year. In 2006, the Baumels filed suit against Syria under the Foreign Sovereign Immunities Act in the United States District Court for the District of Columbia, charging the Syrian government and top officials with "Zachary's abduction and illegal imprisonment".

In Israel, the elder Baumel maintained a high public profile to keep his son's plight before the nation and the military. He joined many protests and demonstrations, briefly engaged in a hunger strike, and was openly critical of the way his family was being treated by the IDF. In 2003 Baumel fought against the IDF's decision to declare his son dead. In the absence of an official government effort to locate the missing soldiers, he and other parents of those missing established their own group called The International Coalition for Missing Israeli Soldiers and followed up leads around the world. As a result of their lobbying efforts in the United States, President Bill Clinton signed into law "A Bill to Locate and Secure the Release of Zachary Baumel, an American Citizen and Other Israelis Missing in Action" on November 8, 1999. This law ordered the US State Department to discuss the issue of missing Israeli soldiers with Arab governments in the Middle East on "an urgent basis", and to "[link] U.S. economic assistance to those governments to their cooperation".

== Recovery of remains ==
On April 3, 2019, Russian President Vladimir Putin announced that the Russian army, in coordination with the Syrian military, had located Baumel's remains. The bodies of Baumel and 20 other people had been removed from the old Martyrs' Cemetery in the Yarmouk refugee camp south of Damascus earlier in April. The Israeli–Russian cooperation was part of a two-year military operation called Operation Bittersweet Song, which endeavored to locate remains of missing Israeli soldiers buried in Syrian territory formerly controlled by ISIL. The operation reportedly opened "hundreds" of graves and exhumed hundreds of bodies for analysis. When Baumel's grave was opened, the searchers immediately noticed that the body was dressed in an IDF uniform and tzitzit. Both the uniform and military boots bore the name "Baumel". The body was moved to a neighboring country for testing and samples sent to the Abu Kabir Forensic Institute in Tel Aviv, which confirmed Baumel's identity.

Israeli Prime Minister Benjamin Netanyahu flew to Moscow to meet with Putin, and then received Baumel's remains in a ceremony at the Russian defense ministry, where he was also presented with Baumel's uniform and military boots. Baumel was interred at the Mount Herzl military cemetery in Jerusalem on April 4, 2019, in the presence of Netanyahu and Israeli President Reuven Rivlin. Thousands attended the nighttime funeral.

In January 2020, Israel released two Syrian prisoners as a 'goodwill gesture' in relation to the transfer of Baumel's remains.
