= Hebrew Institute of Boro Park =

Closed Jewish day school in Brooklyn

Coordinates: 40°38′3.91″N 73°59′34.94″W

- Borough Park, Brooklyn; New York City, New York; United States

Information
- Other name: Yeshivas Etz Chaim/Etz Hayim
- School type: Jewish day school
- Established: 1916 (110 years ago)
- Status: Defunct
- Closed
- Principal: Rabbi Akiva Wadler (final principal)
- Enrollment: c. 200 (1970 (56 years ago))

The Hebrew Institute of Boro Park (HIBP, also known as Yeshivas Etz Chaim/Etz Hayim) is a defunct private schoolin New York City. It was the first Jewish day school in Borough Park, Brooklyn.

== History ==
Founded in 1916, the school was the first yeshiva (Jewish day school) in Borough Park. It was located at 5000 13th Avenue.

== Enrollment ==
During its heyday, the school had three parallel classes through grade 6, and two parallel classes for grades 7 and 8. The loss of a class was partly due to those parents who subsequently sent their sons to (public) junior high school. It went from having approximately 600 students during the mid-1960s to an estimated 200 students by 1970.

== Principals ==
- Rabbi Israel D. Lerner
- Rabbi Moshe I. Shulman
- Max Kufeld, 1st English principal
- Mrs. Bella Nemiroff, (unofficial) English principal
- Dr. Hochberg (principal after Israel Lerner)
- Rabbi Jerome Karlin (principal 1970–1977)
- Rabbi Akiva Wadler (1978 – final year of the school)

== Other yeshivas ==
By the time the yeshiva closed, the area was becoming more Hasidic. However, the area still featured two other long-time non-Hasidic schools; Shulamith School for Girls, a girls' school and another boys' school, Yeshiva Toras Emes Kaminetz, which was seven blocks away. Both these schools later moved to Flatbush.

Shulamith was two buildings, one of them partially using the nearby Young Israel of Boro Park, the other directly across YIBP. Both of these buildings were sold to Viznitz Yeshiva.

== Foundation ==
Etz Chaim's building was sold and the proceeds were used to establish the Yeshiva Etz Chaim Foundation to support religious education. (Retired) Judge Jerome Hornblass was an early administrator.

An alumni reunion was held in 1997 for the graduates of the school which "was located in a beautiful building on 13th Avenue between 50 and 51st Streets." That building has since been demolished; several stores and a bank are now on that block.

== Notable students ==
- Zachary Baumel (1960–1982) – American-Israeli soldier
- Martin Yarmush (born 1952) – American biomedical scientist and engineer
- Spencer Ross (born 1940) – sports broadcaster
- Alan Dershowitz (born 1938) – attorney
- Dovid Katz (born 1956) – Yiddish scholar
