= Giora Lev =

Israeli mayor and general

- גיורא לב
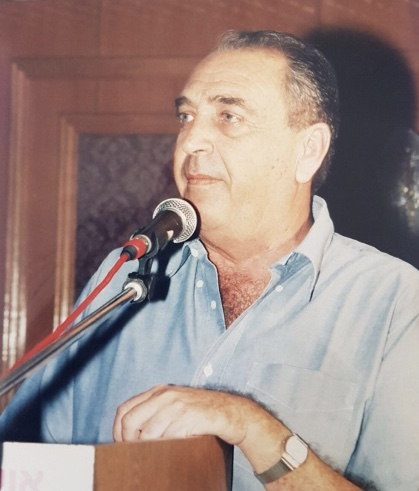

Mayor of Petah Tikva
- In office 1989–1998
- Preceded by: Dov Tavori
- Succeeded by: Yitzhak Ochaion

Personal details
- Born: June 30, 1939 (age 87) Haifa, Mandatory Palestine
- Party: Likud

Military service
- Allegiance: Israel
- Branch/service: Israel Defense Force
- Rank: Brigadier General
- Battles/wars: Six Days War; Yom Kippur War; Lebanese Civil War

Giora Lev (Hebrew: גיורא לב; born 30 June 1939) was the 7th mayor of Petah Tikva (1989-1998) and Brigadier-general in the Israel Defense Forces.

He was born in Haifa and studied in Kadoorie Agricultural High School. Once conscripted, he joined the Armored Corps where he was trained in combat roles and as a tank commander. During the Yom Kippur War, he commanded the 264th Battalion (under the 421st Brigade), the first tank battalion to cross the Suez Canal during Operation Abirey-Halev. During the First Lebanon War, he commanded the 90th Division which fought along the eastern front, including in the Battle of Sultan Yacoub. Later, he also served as Israel's military attaché to South Africa. In 1989, he was elected mayor of Petah Tikva on behalf of the Likud where he served for two terms before losing the third to Yitzhak Ochaion, an independent affiliated with Labour.
