= Israeli MIAs =

Israel Defense Forces members who are missing in action

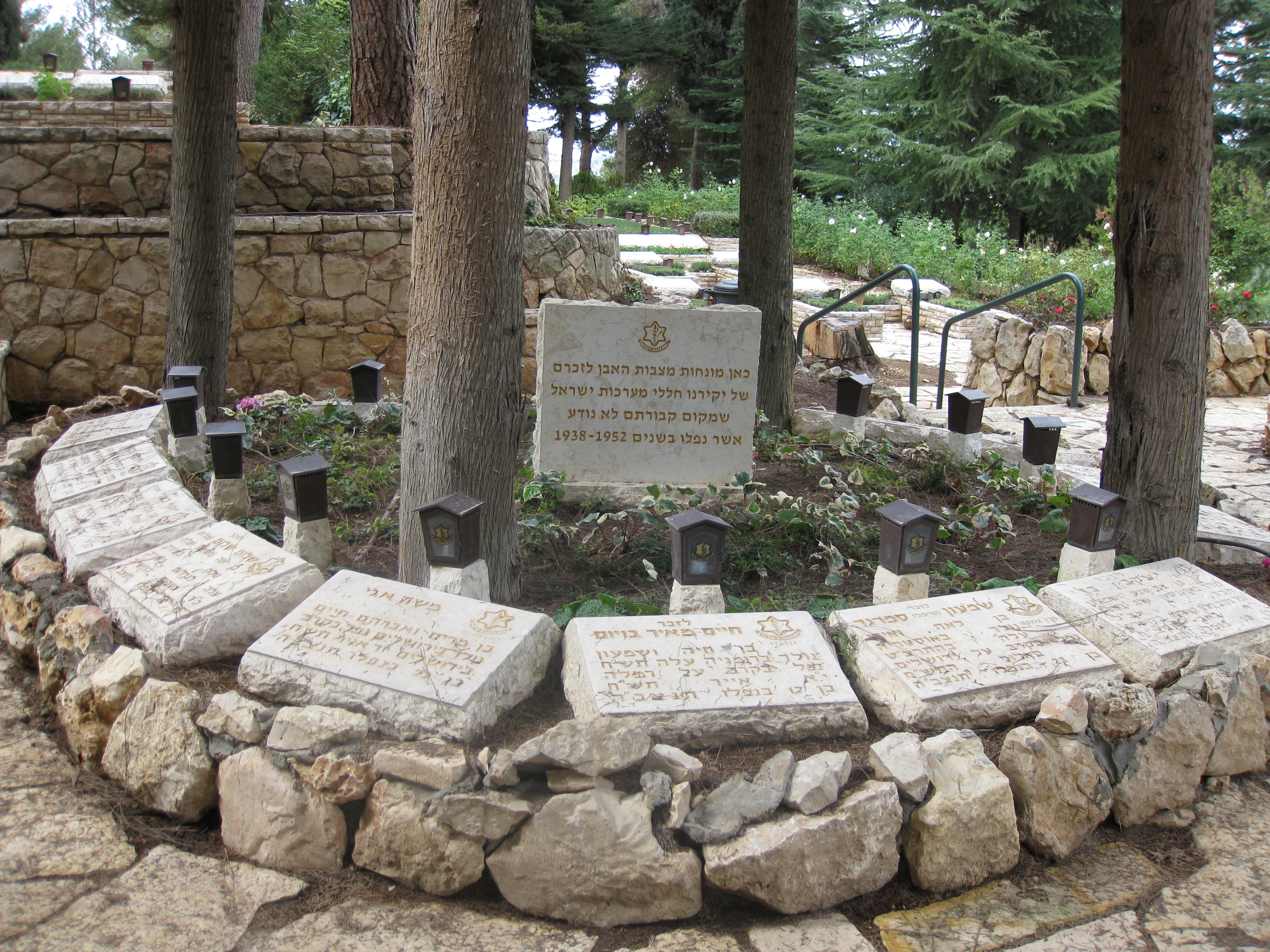
Empty graves at the Garden of the Missing in Action

Israeli MIA are members of the Israel Defense Forces who are missing in action. Despite efforts to locate and repatriate them, their whereabouts remain unknown. Every year, a state ceremony is held at Mount Herzl, Israel's military cemetery in Jerusalem.

== IDF prisoners of war ==
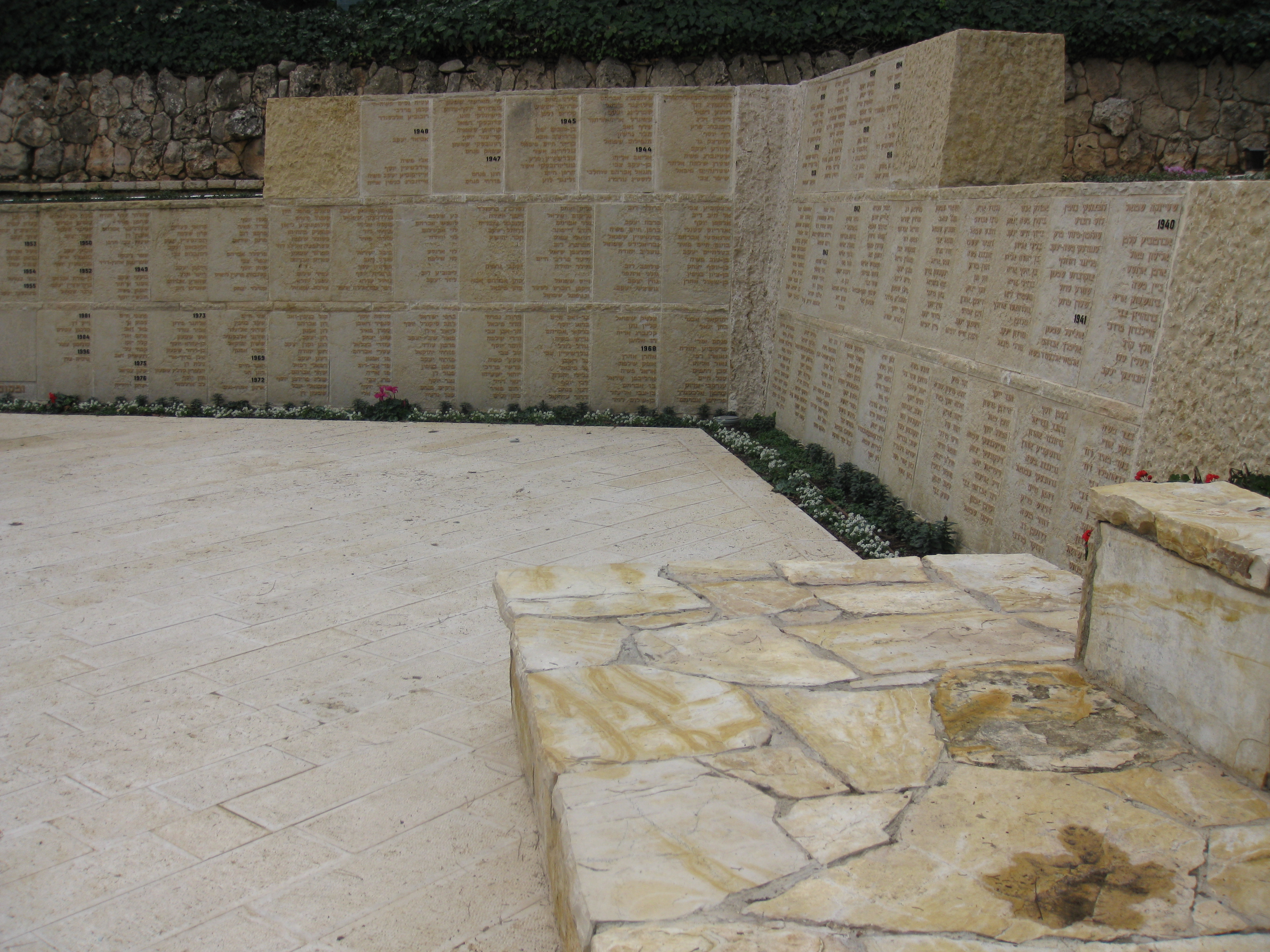
Commemorative wall at the Garden of the Missing in Action

In the Yom Kippur War 301 Israelis were captured by Syria and Egypt, 232 of whom by the Egyptians, 65 by the Syrians and 4 by the Lebanese. The majority of them were captured in the first stage of that war. Some Israeli soldiers reported after their release about the difficult conditions they faced: they were severely beaten by their captors, sometimes making them unconscious, while many reported that they were being investigated under torture.

=== Known Israeli MIAs ===
- Ron Arad, an IDF F-4 Phantom II navigator, was lost over Lebanon on October 16, 1986.
- Guy Hever disappeared on duty in the Golan Heights on August 17, 1997.

=== October 7th and aftermath ===
During the Hamas October 7 invasion of Israel, 251 people were abducted from Israel into the Gaza strip. Of these, at least 23 were IDF soldiers, while the rest were Israeli civilians (both Jewish and non-Jewish), and foreign workers. Seven of the soldiers taken hostage were taken from the Nahal Oz military base, near the Kibbutz Nahal Oz, during the Nahal Oz attack. All seven were females. One was rescued three weeks after being taken hostage, the body of another was recovered in November 2023, (Note: Her body was recovered from Al-Shifa Hospital) and the other five were released in January 2025 as part of the second Gaza war ceasefire. The remainder of the soldiers taken captive include Colonel Asaf Hamami, the highest ranking officer whose body was abducted, Sergeant Major Muhammad Alatrash an Israeli from the Bedouin community, and Edan Alexander, an Israeli-American citizen. Alexander was released on May 12, 2025 as a "gesture of goodwill toward US President Donald Trump."

== Recovered MIAs and KIAs ==
The remains of several Israeli soldiers missing and killed in action have been recovered.

Name	Date Missing/Killed	Circumstance	Date Recovered	Circumstance
Arthur Gasner	20 April 1949	Killed and body taken to Idna	6 May 1949 / 15 May 2025	His body was recovered 6 May 1949 along with the bodies of his fellow soldiers. His body was identified on 15 May 2025, having been considered an MIA for 76 years.
Zachary Baumel	10–11 June 1982	Battle of Sultan Yacoub	4 April 2019	Operation Bittersweet Song
Zvi Feldman	10–11 June 1982	Battle of Sultan Yacoub	11 May 2025	Mossad Operation
Yehuda Katz	10–11 June 1982	Battle of Sultan Yacoub	17 August 2026	Recovert in an operation led by the Military Intelligence Directorate, in coordination with the Mossad.
Nachshon Wachsman	9 October 1994	Abduction and killing of Nachshon Wachsman	14 October 1994	Rescue Attempt
Ehud Goldwasser	12 July 2006	Operation Truthful Promise	16 July 2008	Prisoner Exchange
Eldad Regev	12 July 2006	Operation Truthful Promise	16 July 2008	Prisoner Exchange
Gilad Shalit	25 June 2006	2006 Gaza cross-border raid	18 October 2011	Gilad Shalit prisoner exchange
Oron Shaul	20 July 2014	Battle of Shuja'iyya	19 January 2025	ISA/Shabak Operation
Hadar Goldin	1 August 2014	2014 Gaza War	9 November 2025	Returned by Hamas in accordance to the Gaza peace plan

== Procedure and guidelines ==
According to Reuben Yardor, a military intelligence leader of the Yom Kippur War, the automatic assumption they made was that all that's known to their captured soldiers is also known to the captors.

Several publicized stories of Israeli prisoners of war were:

- Corporal Uri Ilan, undercover soldier in the Golani Brigade who committed suicide in a Syrian prison in 1955, leaving a note in which he wrote, "I did not betray."
- Lieutenant Colonel Avi Nir, fighter pilot shot down and captured during the Yom Kippur War, died in captivity without revealing secrets to his captors. He was posthumously awarded the Medal of Courage, for "[He] was tortured to death by investigators but revealed no information. Doing so demonstrates loyalty and supreme sacrifice."
- Lieutenant Amos Levinberg, intelligence officer taken captive by the Syrians in the beginning the Yom Kippur War, and gave his captors a lot of information. He was eventually released in a prisoner exchange.

== See also ==
- Gilad Shalit
- Disappearance of Ron Arad
- Majdi Halabi
- List of Israeli prisoner exchanges
