= Hezi Shai =

Israeli soldier, captive in the 1982 Lebanon War

- חזי שי
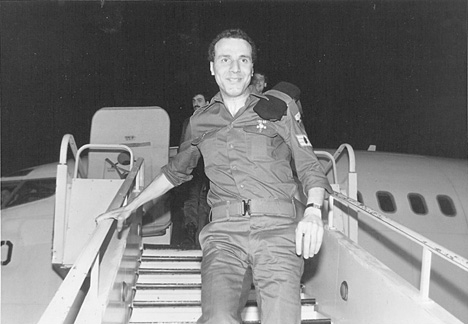
- Born: 1954 (age 71–72); Nes Ziona, Israel
- Known for: Tank commander captured during the 1982 Battle of Sultan Yacoub and released with two other Israeli soldiers in return for 1,150 Palestinian and Lebanese security prisoners (Jibril Agreement)

Hezi Shai (Hebrew: חזי שי; born 1954) is a former tank commander in the Israel Defense Forces. During the 1982 Lebanon War, he was one of five Israeli soldiers declared missing in action after their tanks were hit during the Battle of Sultan Yacoub.

Shai and his tank crew became separated and he walked into a camp of the Popular Front for the Liberation of Palestine – General Command, a pro-Syria Palestinian militant organization headed by Ahmed Jibril. He was taken captive and smuggled into Syria. His whereabouts and even the fact that he was alive were unknown to the Israeli defense establishment for the next two and a half years. Later a nephew of Jibril captured by the Israelis hinted to Shai's existence. Following extensive negotiations mediated by Austrian diplomats, Shai and two other captured Israeli soldiers were released in May 1985 in exchange for 1,150 Palestinian and Lebanese security prisoners held by Israel. The Jibril Agreement, involving as it did so many Palestinian prisoners, many of whom were serving life sentences for mass murder, was not popular in Israel, but Defense Minister Yitzchak Rabin convinced the Israeli Cabinet to approve the deal.

== Biography ==
Hezi Shai was born in Nes Ziona, Israel, to Shlomo and Doris Shai, both immigrants from Baghdad. He has four sisters. He studied at a national-religious school in Pardes Katz.

Shai served as a staff sergeant and tank commander during his army service. He led a course for tank commanders. Following his discharge from the army, he began working for Bank Leumi, where he met his wife, Iris.

Shai has three children and resides in Holon. His son Omer, born one year after Shai's release, was named in honor of Dr. Herbert Amry, the Austrian diplomat who mediated the release.

== Battle of Sultan Yacoub and captivity ==
On 9 June 1982, three days after the 1982 Lebanon War broke out, Shai was called up with other reservists. Shai commanded a tank deployed in the Battle of Sultan Yacoub. The eleven-tank convoy was surrounded by Syrian and Palestinian forces and engaged in heavy fighting throughout the night of 10–11 June. When ordered to retreat to Israeli lines, Shai's tank, which was the last in the convoy, was hit by an enemy shell and its turret was entangled in a tree. The crew, consisting of Shai, Zechariah Baumel, Zvi Feldman, and Arye Lieberman, abandoned the tank and hid in an orchard. They came under fire again and were separated. Shai wandered into a camp occupied by the Popular Front for the Liberation of Palestine – General Command (PFLP-GC), a pro-Syria Palestinian militant organization headed by Ahmed Jibril, and was taken prisoner.

Shai recounted in an interview:

"On the way down I entered a Jibril camp. Someone approached and asked, 'Who are you?' I replied in Arabic that I was with the Iraqi forces. There were artillery forces below and I said, 'I am with the cannons', I spoke the word 'cannons' in Hebrew with an Arab accent. I simply forgot the Arabic word. The guy told me to go, but someone else heard me and told me to wait. He came out and saw me and said, 'You are an Israeli.' The jig was up".

Shai was questioned by gun-wielding PFLP-GC members, then blindfolded and shoved into the trunk of a car. He was bound hand and foot and the car drove off. After a half-hour drive, Shai was pulled out, and his captors began slapping him. Then they applied red iodine to his face and covered his head and eyes. He later realized that this was a subterfuge used to smuggle him into Damascus. "For the first three months of my captivity I thought I was in Beirut, when I was actually in a residential neighborhood in Damascus", he said.

Shai was held for two years in a dirty bathroom in a Damascus apartment. He wore pajamas and his legs were chained. The bathroom, measuring 1.8 m × 1.4 m (5 ft 11 in × 4 ft 7 in), contained a toilet, a faucet, and a bed, and was fitted with a heavy iron door. Shai spent hours lying on his back thinking about his wife and family. Sometimes he paced the small area, and he also began cleaning the wall tiles and sealing the cracks with soap to prevent the incursion of roaches. He was able to obtain a Tanakh and also fashioned small houses and cars out of matchsticks to maintain his sanity.

Shai was interrogated frequently by his captors and asked to see a Red Cross representative, but his request was denied. At one point he started a hunger strike to force them to bring in the Red Cross, but gave up when he saw it was not working. His captors continually played mind games with him, making him doubt his wife's loyalty. When they told him, eight months after his capture, that they had kidnapped two other Israeli soldiers, he contemplated suicide in order to "screw them", figuring his captors would demand a high price for his return.

Two years into his ordeal, Shai was transferred to a larger cell. He was briefly given over to interrogation by the Syrians, who "beat him with broomsticks and subjected him to electric shocks" before returning him to the Jibril group.

== Prisoner exchange ==
For the first two and a half years of his captivity, the Israeli defense establishment did not know that Shai was alive and assumed him dead. The only hint that an Israeli soldier was being held prisoner came one month after the Battle of Sultan Yakoub, when a Jibril officer reported to Ad-Dustour, a Lebanese newspaper, that his group was holding a prisoner named "Tetsi Shai". This information was not acted upon by the Israeli Intelligence Community.

In September 1982, Israel opened negotiations with the PFLP-GC through a foreign mediator for the return of two Israeli soldiers, Yosef Grof and Nissim Salem, who had been captured by the PFLP-GC on the Beirut-Damascus highway. Four other soldiers abducted with Grof and Salem had already been repatriated in an earlier prisoner exchange. While Jibril did not mention that his group was holding Shai, Shmuel Tamir, the lead negotiator, began to suspect Shai was alive when Jibril's nephew was apprehended by Israel and hinted to that effect. The Israelis found the Ad-Dustour report in their intelligence files and began to pressure Syria. The President of Austria appointed Dr. Herbert Amry, Austrian ambassador to Greece, to conduct the lengthy negotiations with the PFLP-GC, and Amry began shuttling between Tel Aviv and Syria. On 5 July 1984, Amry visited Shai, took his picture, and asked him to write a letter to his wife. Amry presented proof of Shai's existence at an Israeli press conference a few days later.

The brokered deal, known as the Jibril Agreement, called for PFLP-GC to release the three Israeli soldiers in exchange for 1,150 Palestinian and Lebanese security prisoners being held by Israel. Involving as it did so many Palestinian prisoners, many of whom were serving life sentences for mass murder, the Jibril Agreement was not popular in Israel. Jewish residents of the West Bank were incensed that Palestinians convicted of killing settlers were being set free, and protests were staged. Defense Minister Yitzchak Rabin claimed that an Entebbe-style rescue operation had not been possible, so he "had no choice" and had negotiated "the best terms we could", and convinced the Israeli Cabinet to approve it. Minister without portfolio Moshe Arens supported Rabin in the vote, but later regretted it. Many of the released prisoners went on to participate in the First Intifada and committed further attacks against Israeli civilians.

Grof, Salem, and Shai were delivered to Red Cross representatives at the Geneva Airport on 20 May 1985.

In the years following his release, Shai suffered from post-traumatic stress, having difficulty concentrating and sleeping, and "getting angry and upset over every little thing". His impatience, fear of authority figures, and recurring dreams of being in captivity persisted for many years.

== Banking and public speaking career ==
Shai works as a project manager in Bank Leumi's main branch in Tel Aviv. He also speaks before Israeli soldier groups, gives interviews to media on prisoner negotiations, and visits families of captured soldiers to offer encouragement.

== See also ==
- List of kidnappings
- List of solved missing person cases
