= Jibril Agreement =

1985 Israeli and PFLP-GC prisoner exchange deal

The Jibril Agreement (Arabic: اتفاقية جبريل, romanized: Ittifāqīyat Jibrīl) or "Jibril Deal" (Hebrew: עסקת ג'יבריל, romanized: Iskat Jibril) was a prisoner exchange deal which took place on 21 May 1985 between the Israeli government, then headed by Shimon Peres, and the Popular Front for the Liberation of Palestine – General Command (PFLP-GC). As part of the agreement, Israel released 1,150 security prisoners held in Israeli prisons in exchange for three Israeli prisoners (Yosef Grof, Nissim Salem, Hezi Shai) captured during the 1982 Lebanon War. This was one of several prisoner exchange agreements carried out between Israel and groups it classified as terrorist organizations around that time.

Among the prisoners released by Israel were Kozo Okamoto—one of the perpetrators of the Lod Airport Massacre in May 1972, who had been sentenced to life imprisonment—and Ahmed Yassin, a Gazan Muslim Brotherhood leader who was sentenced to 13 years imprisonment in 1983 and who later became the spiritual leader of Hamas. Another prisoner released was Ali Jiddah, who had served 17 years for planting of a bomb near a Jerusalem hospital in 1968 that wounded nine Israelis. Another prisoner released was Ziyad al-Nakhalah, who was serving a life sentence, and who has been the leader of Palestinian Islamic Jihad since 28 September 2018. Abdullah Nimar Darwish, on the other hand, renounced violence by Palestinians within Israel's pre-1967 borders.

The Israeli government faced harsh public criticism for agreeing to release the 1,150 security prisoners, among them those sentenced to life imprisonment and responsible for the killing of many Israeli citizens, particularly since the exchange did not include the three IDF soldiers who were declared missing in action after the Battle of Sultan Yacoub in 1982. One of the Israeli negotiators resigned in protest against the agreement. All of the government ministers, with the exception of Yitzhak Navon, supported the agreement.

Many of the Palestinian prisoners released in this agreement later went on to form the backbone of the leadership of the First Intifada, which broke out less than three years after the agreement.

The agreement with the PFLP-GC reportedly took nearly a year to negotiate. The nickname for the agreement came about as a reference to Palestinian militant leader Ahmed Jibril.

On 30 June 1985, 39 foreigners seized on a TWA Flight 847 en route from Athens to Rome, hijacked to Beirut, were released. On 1 July 1985 Israel announced that it was ready to release Shia detainees from its prisons. Over the next several weeks, Israel released over 700 Shia prisoners, but Israel denied that the prisoners' release was related to the hijacking. In July 1985, 331 Lebanese Shias freed from Israeli detention claimed their release was part of a prisoner exchange deal, but the Israeli government formally denied that connection.

== See also ==
- List of Israeli prisoner exchanges
- Bhamdoun abduction operation
- Ahmed Jibril
- Popular Front for the Liberation of Palestine - General Command (PFLP-GC)
