= Battle of Sultan Yacoub =

Battle between Syria and Israel during the 1982 Lebanon War

Coordinates: 33°36′55″N 35°51′10″E

- Part of the 1982 Lebanon War and Lebanese Civil War
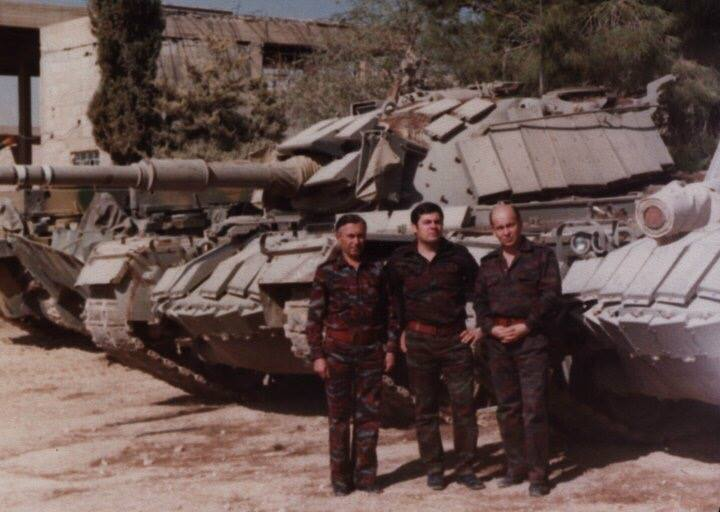
- Syrian soldiers standing in front of an Israeli tanks captured after the battle
Date	10–11 June 1982
Location	Near Sultan Yacoub, Bekaa Lebanon
Result	Syrian victory
Territorial changes	Israel fails to capture Sultan Yacoub from Syria

Belligerents
Israel	Syria

Commanders and leaders
(Israel) Brig. Gen. Giora Lev (Israel) Com. Hezi Shai (MIA)	Gen. Ali Habib Mahmud; Gen. Shafiq Fayadh

Units involved
Israel Defense Forces; Israeli Ground Forces; 90th Division; Artillery battalions	Syrian Armed Forces; Syrian Army; 1st Armoured Division; 3rd Armoured Division

Casualties and losses
(Israel) 30 soldiers killed (Israel) 5 soldiers missing (Israel) 10 tanks lost (Israel) 3 APCs destroyed	Unknown

The Battle of Sultan Yacoub was a battle between Syria and Israel during the 1982 Lebanon War, which occurred near the village of Sultan Yacoub in the Lebanese Bekaa, close to the borders with Syria.

== Background ==
At the beginning of the invasion Israeli Brig. Gen. Giora Lev’s 90th Division passed through Marjayoun and took up positions around Kaukaba and Hasbaiya. From there it began to push the Syrian 76th and 91st Armored Brigade, of the 10th Division, north up the Bekaa Valley towards Joub Jannine. The Syrians made skillful use of their Gazelle helicopters to support the delaying action, firing HOT missiles into the long columns of Israeli vehicles stretched out along the roads. Israel countered with its own Cobra helicopters, used against both ground targets and the Gazelles.

== Battle ==
On June 10, 1982, the Israeli 90th Division was rushed forward in order to gain as much ground as possible before the cease-fire came into effect. Late that night most of its 362nd Battalion as well as Pluga Kaph from the 363rd Battalion fought its way through Syrian infantry in the village of Sultan Yacoub only to become cut off and surrounded. At dawn, the Israelis broke out and escaped to the south with the support of 11 battalions of artillery firing both at the Syrians and in a box barrage around their own troops. In the six-hours ordeal the Israeli Army lost 10 tanks and about 30 killed. The Israelis failed to destroy the disabled M48A3 Magach-3 tanks they left behind and they were recovered the next day by the Syrians.

== Aftermath ==
Thirty IDF soldiers died in the battle, which was viewed as an Israeli intelligence failure. Five IDF soldiers were missing in action: Zachary Baumel, Yehuda Katz, Zvi Feldman, Ariel Lieberman, and Hezi Shai. The first three soldiers were reportedly paraded through Damascus atop their captured tank; Time reporter Dean Brelis testified to having seen the three captives alive at the time. Baumel's body was recovered in a secret military operation in 2019 and Feldman's body was recovered in an operation by the Mossad in 2025. Lieberman was released in a prisoner exchange in June 1984. Katz remained missing in action, until his body was located in August 2026.

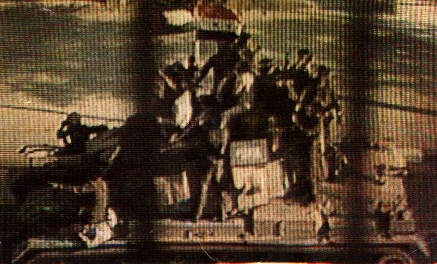
M48 tank, captured by Syria after the battle, on Damascus "victory parade"

Tank commander Hezi Shai was presumed dead by the Israeli defense establishment. Two and a half years later, his whereabouts were discovered in Damascus, where he was being held by the Popular Front for the Liberation of Palestine – General Command (PFLP-GC), a pro-Syria Palestinian militant organization led by Ahmed Jibril. Shai's repatriation was negotiated together with that of two other captured Israeli soldiers, Yosef Grof and Nissim Salem, through mediator and Austrian diplomat Dr. Herbert Amry, in return for 1,150 Palestinian and Lebanese prisoners being held by Israel. Shai was returned to Israel in May 1985.

== Legacy ==
The battle is still widely commemorated and remembered in Syria. A large painting depicting the battle is displayed in the Tomb of the Unknown Soldier in Damascus, among other paintings depicting other significant battles in Arab and Syrian history, and one of the Israeli M48 Patton tanks captured during the battle is now on display at the October War Panorama in Damascus, with another on display in the Kubinka Tank Museum in Russia, most likely donated by Syria due to their extremely-close bilateral ties.
