= War crimes in the 2006 Lebanon War =

During the 2006 Lebanon War, Amnesty International, Human Rights Watch, and United Nations officials accused both Hezbollah and Israel of violating international humanitarian law. These have included allegations of intentional attacks on civilian populations or infrastructure, disproportionate or indiscriminate attacks, the use of human shields, and the use of prohibited weapons.

Under international humanitarian law, warring parties are obliged to distinguish between combatants and civilians, ensure that attacks on legitimate military targets are proportional, and guarantee that the military advantage of such attacks outweigh the possible harm done to civilians. Violations of these laws are considered war crimes.

According to various media reports, between 1,000 and 1,200 Lebanese citizens were reported dead; there were between 1,500 and 2,500 people wounded and over 1,000,000 were temporarily displaced. Over 150 Israelis were killed; around 700 wounded; and 300,000–500,000 were displaced.

Hezbollah was accused by Israel of deliberately targeting cities and civilian centers in Israel with deadly fire, with its rocket batteries concentrating attacks on Israeli cities along the border, most of which had no direct affiliation with any military activity. In return, Hezbollah claimed its rockets may have hit Israeli civilians areas largely due to weapon inaccuracy, while mostly aiming to hit military and strategic industrial zones. Israel said that it tried to avoid civilians, and had distributed leaflets calling on civilian residents to evacuate, but claimed that Hezbollah stored weapons in and fired from civilian areas and transferred weapons using ambulances, making those areas legitimate targets, and used civilians as human shields.

== Use of human shields ==
Israeli officials accused Hezbollah of intentionally using the civilian population as human shields, and several reports have said that Hezbollah fired rockets from residential areas to draw Israeli fire on those areas, which maximised civilian casualties. The IDF released pictures and videos it said demonstrated Hezbollah's use of mosques and homes for rocket storage and launching. The IDF claimed that Hezbollah had set up roadblocks to prevent residents from leaving the warzone, while Amnesty International reported that "around 100,000 civilians were trapped in southern Lebanon, afraid to flee following Israeli threats to target all moving vehicles", and after statements by Israeli Justice Minister Haim Ramon that "all those now in south Lebanon are terrorists who are related in some way to Hezbollah".

In U.S. documents leaked online, it was alleged that Hezbollah used legitimate medical aid supply as cover to transfer weapons during the war.

Amnesty International investigated Israeli complaints of the use of human shields by Hezbollah, but found no evidence for the claims. They concluded that "it [was] not apparent that civilians were present and used as 'human shields'." A statement issued by Human Rights Watch supported Amnesty's conclusion and "found no cases in which Hezbollah deliberately used civilians as shields to protect them from retaliatory IDF attack."

Human Rights Watch stated that "while it may be unlawful... to place forces, weapons and ammunition within or near densely populated areas, it is only shielding when there is a specific intent to use the civilians to deter an attack." After his mission to coordinate aid efforts in Lebanon, U.N. humanitarian chief Jan Egeland stated that "Hizbullah must stop this cowardly blending... among women and children," and that "I heard they were proud because they lost very few fighters and that it was the civilians bearing the brunt of this. I don't think anyone should be proud of having many more children and women dead than armed men."

A 6 September 2007 Human Rights Watch report asserted that most of the civilian deaths in Lebanon resulted from "indiscriminate Israeli airstrikes" and that Israeli aircraft targeted vehicles carrying fleeing civilians. The report stated that the investigation "refutes the argument made by Israeli officials that most of the Lebanese civilian casualties were due to Hezbollah routinely hiding among civilians." In a statement issued before the report's release, the human rights organization said there was no basis to the Israeli government's claim that civilian casualties resulted from Hezbollah guerrillas using civilians as shields. Kenneth Roth, Human Rights Watch executive director, said there were only "rare" cases of Hezbollah operating in civilian villages. "To the contrary, once the war started, most Hezbollah military officials and even many political officials left the villages," he said. "Most Hezbollah military activity was conducted from prepared positions outside Lebanese villages in the hills and valleys around."

A US Army War College study concluded that Hezbollah made extensive use of civilian homes as direct fire combat positions, however, the villages Hezbollah used to anchor its defensive system in southern Lebanon were largely evacuated by the time Israeli ground forces crossed the border on 18 July. As a result, the key battlefields in the land campaign south of the Litani River were mostly devoid of civilians, and IDF participants consistently report little or no meaningful intermingling of Hezbollah fighters and noncombatants. Nor is there any systematic reporting of Hezbollah using civilians in the combat zone as shields.

Upon his visit to Lebanon, United Nations Undersecretary-General for Humanitarian Affairs and Emergency Relief Coordinator Jan Egeland accused Hezbollah of "cowardly blending ... among women and children. I heard they were proud because they lost very few fighters and that it was the civilians bearing the brunt of this. I don't think anyone should be proud of having many more children and women dead than armed men." A Human Rights Watch report released on 3 August said:

"Human Rights Watch found no cases in which Hezbollah deliberately used civilians as shields to protect them from retaliatory IDF attack. In none of the cases of civilian deaths documented in this report is there evidence to suggest that Hezbollah forces or weapons were in or near the area that the IDF targeted during or just prior to the attack."

In the same report, Human Rights Watch wrote:

"Hezbollah occasionally did store weapons in or near civilian homes and fighters placed rocket launchers within populated areas or near U.N. observers, which are serious violations of the laws of war because they violate the duty to take all feasible precautions to avoid civilian casualties. ... In addition, Human Rights Watch continues to investigate allegations that Hezbollah is shielding its military personnel and materiel by locating them in civilian homes or areas, and it is deeply concerned by Hezbollah's placement of certain troops and materiel near civilians, which endangers them and violates the duty to take all feasible precautions to avoid civilian casualties. Human Rights Watch uses the occasion of this report to reiterate Hezbollah’s legal duty never to deliberately use civilians to shield military objects and never to needlessly endanger civilians by conducting military operations, maintaining troops, or storing weapons in their vicinity."

Human Rights Watch later printed an editorial reiterating these concerns in the context of strong criticism of the conduct of both sides in the conflict on 5 October.

An Amnesty International report released on 21 November 2006, found that there wasn't "conclusive evidence" of the use of "human shields":

"While the presence of Hizbullah’s fighters and short-range weapons within civilian areas is not contested, this in itself is not conclusive evidence of intent to use civilians as "human shields", any more than the presence of Israeli soldiers in a kibbutz is in itself evidence of the same war crime."

There have been other reports of Hezbollah using civilians as human shields. On 12 July, the very same day that Hezbollah sparked the war by kidnapping the two Israeli soldiers, the Israeli government publicized photographic and video evidence of Hezbollah's human shield tactics. The Sunday Herald Sun printed pictures that were smuggled out of Lebanon. One showing militants in a Lebanese town riding a truck equipped with an anti-aircraft gun, another showing a militant carrying an AK-47 rifle. The photographer, a Melbourne man who refused to give his name, stated that he was less than 400 meters from the block when it was obliterated. He said that "Hezbollah came in to launch their rockets, then within minutes the area was blasted by Israeli jets ... Until the Hezbollah fighters arrived, it had not been touched by the Israelis. Then it was totally devastated. It was carnage. Two innocent people died in that incident, but it was so lucky it was not more." The New Yorker reported how a Sidon mosque was used as a Hezbollah weapons cache before it was bombed by Israel.

On 5 December 2006, the IDF declassified photographic and video recorded evidence of Hezbollah's human shield tactics. Ynetnews reported:

"The IDF [had] found that Hizbullah is preventing civilians from leaving villages in southern Lebanon. Roadblocks have been set up outside some of the villages to prevent residents from leaving, while in other villages Hizbullah is preventing UN representatives from entering, who are trying to help residents leave."

Israeli military spokesman, Capt. Jacob Dallal, further noted that much of the weaponry threatening Israel was deliberately being stored among civilians: "A lot of the rockets are stored in people's homes in urban areas, fired from within villages and brought in from the Damascus-Beirut highway." The IDF also claims that Hezbollah militants are preventing or impeding the evacuation of civilians from southern Lebanon despite warnings by Israel to do so, thereby keeping civilians inside the military theatre and exposing them to danger.

During a raid in Baalbeck, Israeli forces found what IDF commanders described to the media as "a hospital building that served as a Hezbollah office complex." Israeli soldiers gathered weapons, documents, and other useful intelligence information from the hospital. According to Al Arabia's website, Hezbollah fighters wear uniforms in battle but "dress normally" when among civilians. Hence, fallen Hezbollah fighters in civilian areas are likely to be accounted as civilians casualties.

An editorial in The Washington Times detailed preparations taken by Hezbollah in advance of the July war to hide weaponry in private civilian homes.

== Attacks on civilian targets ==
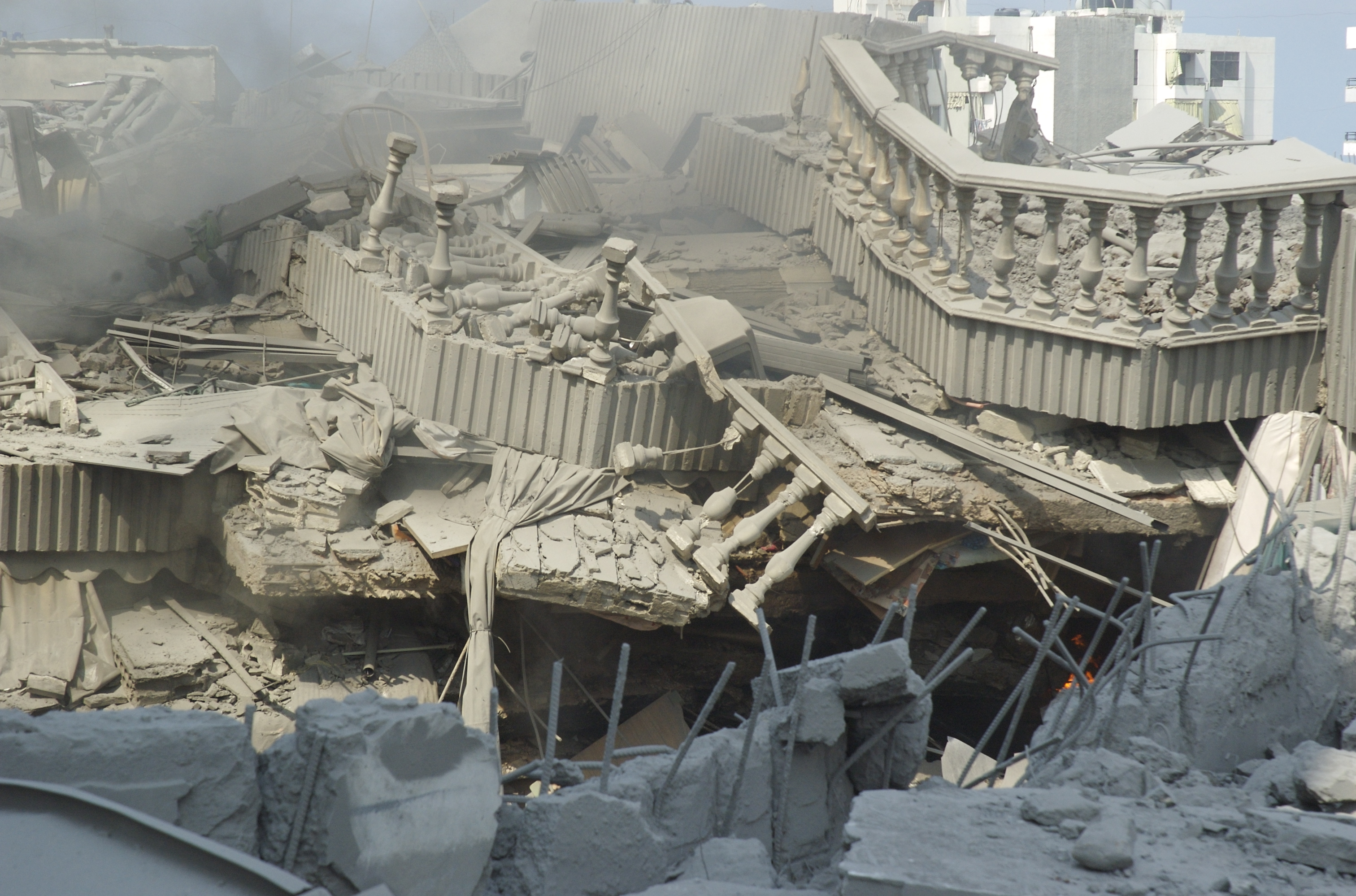
Aftermath of an attack on residential area, Beirut.

Artillery and missiles fired into civilian areas in Lebanon and Israel by both the Israel Defense Forces and Hezbollah were a major component of the 2006 Lebanon war. The Hezbollah attack that initiated the conflict involved the firing of rockets on the Israeli towns of Even Menachem and Mattat, injuring 5 civilians. Four civilians were killed over the next two days.

Intended targeting aside, approximately one-quarter of the Israelis killed by Hezbollah and the vast majority of the Lebanese killed by Israeli forces were widely reported to be civilians. The Boston-based Committee for Accuracy in Middle East Reporting in America, a media watchdog group focused on monitoring any coverage it considers unfair to Israel, suggested that nearly half, or even most, of Lebanese casualties were combatants. Israel, Lebanon, and the international community have all expressed grave concern over the damage to civilian life and property that has resulted from the current conflict. Israel mostly blames Hezbollah, although expressing regret for collateral damage to civilians caused by return fire on Hezbollah positions. Hezbollah blames Israel entirely, downplaying strikes which have killed Israeli civilians as exaggerated or justifiable. Allies of each have expressed similar views.

=== Targeting of civilians by Hezbollah ===
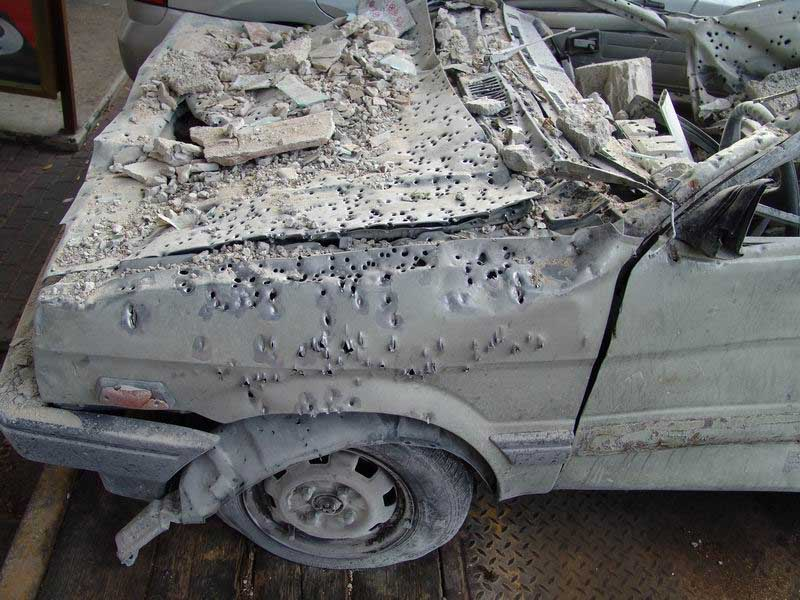
A car in Haifa, Israel damaged by anti-personnel ball bearings from a rocket attack during the 2006 Israel-Lebanon conflict

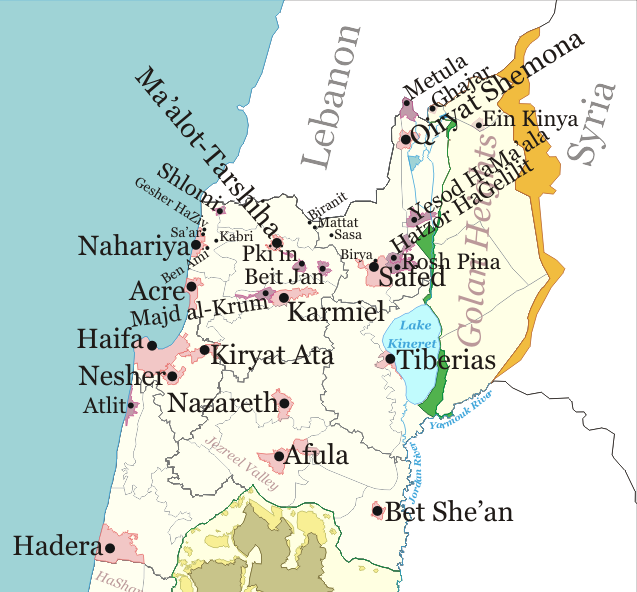
Map showing some of the Israeli localities attacked by rockets fired from Lebanese soil as of 7 August 2006.

Hezbollah fired rockets, sometimes at a rate of more than 150 per day, at civilian targets throughout the conflict. Every major city in northern Israel was hit, including Haifa, Nazareth, Tiberias, Nahariya, Safed, Afula, Kiryat Shmona, Karmiel, and Ma'a lot, along with dozens of kibbutzim, moshavim, and Druze and Arab villages. Hezbollah rocket attacks were responsible for all 43 civilian Israeli fatalities in the conflict, including four heart attacks during rocket attacks, in addition to at least 12 military fatalities. Because of the bombings by Hezbollah of Israel's northern cities, there was a large displaced Israeli citizen population within Israel. "Israeli officials have estimated the number of displaced northern Israelis at 300,000 since the fighting began" on 12 July. Many of the displaced Israelis stayed in Israel's southernmost city, Eilat, where hotels were overbooked. Some were constrained to camp out on the beach instead. Other families stayed in university dormitories in larger cities such as Tel Aviv and Jerusalem or in guests houses in kibbutzim south of Haifa.

Hezbollah also used cluster weapons which can indiscriminately kill civilians. This was the first use of a Chinese made cluster bomb weapon.

Some Hezbollah statements suggest intentions of deliberately targeting civilians. On 24 July Hossein Safiadeen, Hezbollah envoy to Iran, told a conference that included the Tehran-based representative of the Palestinian group Hamas and the ambassadors from Lebanon, Syria and the Palestinian Authority "We are going to make Israel not safe for Israelis". He further outlined his organization's strategy of terrorizing Israeli civilians into leaving their country: "We will expand attacks," he said: "The people who came to Israel, (they) moved there to live, not to die. If we continue to attack, they will leave."

=== Hezbollah's attacks on civilian areas ===
Rockets fired by Hezbollah also landed and resulted in casualties in the Israeli Arab population. Nasrallah has apologized for the first two Arab fatalities, two brothers aged 3 and 5 in the mixed city of Nazareth.

Human Rights Watch stated on 18 July that

"Hezbollah's attacks [on Haifa] were at best indiscriminate attacks in civilian areas, at worst the deliberate targeting of civilians. Either way, they were serious violations of international humanitarian law."

Human Rights Watch has also noted that

"Hezbollah has launched rockets containing thousands of metal ball bearings towards Israeli towns and cities. Human Rights Watch is of the view that neither weapon should be used in or near civilian areas as a matter of international law, because the wide blast effects of these weapons cannot be directed at military targets without imposing a substantial risk of civilian harm and the weapons cannot distinguish between military targets and civilians. (...) Like cluster munitions, the use of rocket heads filled with metal ball bearings cannot be targeted precisely and are indiscriminate weapons when used in populated areas. Their use in rockets fired into populated areas appears intended to maximize harm to civilians."

Civilian infrastructure damaged by rocket attacks included a post office and two Israeli hospitals, according to the director general of the Israeli Ministry of Health, professor Avi Israeli. Rockets have also hit many civilian homes, and a cemetery, an event in which 10 Israelis were killed. In Acre, a Hezbollah rocket destroyed "the only school in the city that serves both Jewish and Arab pupils -- the el-Mahaba ("love" in Arabic) kindergarten for mentally and emotionally handicapped kids."

As for the Arab citizens of Israel in Haifa, Nasrallah said on Al-Manar television, "I have a special message to the Arabs of Haifa, to your martyrs and to your wounded. I call you to leave this city. I hope you do this.... Please leave so we don't shed your blood, which is our blood". Some analysts have drawn a comparison between these warnings and the alleged Arab leaders' endorsement for flight in 1948.

=== Targeting of civilian targets by Israel ===
Strikes on Lebanon's civilian infrastructure include Rafik Hariri International Airport, ports, a lighthouse, grain silos, bridges, roads, factories, ambulances and relief trucks, mobile telephone and television stations, fuel containers and service stations, and the country's largest dairy farm Liban Lait.

An "initial assessment" Amnesty International report on Israeli attacks on civilian infrastructure states that "the evidence strongly suggests that the extensive destruction of public works, power systems, civilian homes and industry was deliberate and an integral part of the military strategy, rather than "collateral damage" – incidental damage to civilians or civilian property resulting from targeting military objectives." UN Undersecretary-General for Humanitarian Affairs and Emergency Relief Coordinator Jan Egeland called Israel's offensive "disproportionate" and declared that the "horrific" leveling of "block after block" of buildings in Beirut "makes it a violation of humanitarian law." Mr Egeland added that one third of the Lebanese dead were children. Around 900,000 Lebanese were displaced during the fighting.

There have been numerous reports of attacks on fleeing civilians. The BBC reported that families evacuating the village of Marwahin in Southern Lebanon were struck on an open road by an Israeli missile attack; killing 17, many of them women and children. Human Rights Watch called for an investigation into this incident. On 23 July 2006 three families fleeing Tyre at the command of the IDF were attacked by rockets fired from Israeli helicopters; they claimed to be prominently waving a white flag from their automobiles, however the Israelis had repeatedly warned civilians not to use vans due to their ability to carry Hezbollah rockets.

An Israeli official stated that

"Hezbollah has a huge arsenal and has fired 1,000 missiles at us. We are acting in self-defense. We are targeting only military objectives, including transport facilities that Hezbollah can use, but you have to remember that Hezbollah often hides in civilian areas. We sent flyers and gave other warnings to civilians to leave before our attacks."

Vice Premier Shimon Peres said Israel had no intention to harm Lebanese civilians, but warned that civilians who live near Hezbollah weapon caches were in danger: "Because we know that some of their rocket caches, which are fired at Israel, are hidden in private apartments, I call on these residents to leave their homes. He who lives near a rocket is likely to get hurt." Hezbollah had placed large amounts of weaponry into sealed rooms in private home prior to the outbreak of the conflict, placing the Lebanese citizenry at risk of attack.

The civilian casualties have been characterised by some as the result of poor intelligence. In mid-June, the Lebanese Security Service allegedly arrested as many as 80 Lebanese citizens which they accused of working for Mossad. The loss of such a significant number of assets would have allowed Hezbollah time to redeploy to new locations prior to the conflict without Israel's knowledge.

On 30 July 2006, Israel hit a residential building in Qana that housed refugees, which Israel said was near Hezbollah rocket launching sites; 28 people died, including 16 children; the death toll initially reported was 57 people including 34 children. The deadly air strike, which followed reports of Israeli attacks on two clearly marked Red Cross ambulances in Qana one week before on 24 July and Israel's 1996 shelling, sparked angry denunciations in Lebanon and abroad. Prime Minister Fouad Siniora revoked US Secretary of State Condoleezza Rice's invitation to Lebanon and said, "Out of respect for the souls of our innocent martyrs and the remains of our children buried under the rubble of Qana, we scream out to our fellow Lebanese and to other Arab brothers and to the whole world to stand united in the face of the Israeli war criminals."

An IDF source said that aerial attacks were ruled out in favor of ground troops in the fighting with Hezbollah in the Lebanese village of Bint Jbeil, for fear of harming the few hundred civilians thought to remain. Nine Israeli soldiers were killed in the operation.

==== Israel's position ====
Israeli officials claim that they try to minimize the civilian casualties by dropping leaflets that warn civilians to leave the area before attacks.

On 14 July, IDF Army Chief of Staff Lt.-Gen. Dan Halutz declared that, "nothing is safe [in Lebanon], as simple as that."

On 19 July, during a speech at a pro-Israel rally in New York, Israel's ambassador to the UN, Dan Gillerman, said: "To those countries who claim that we are using disproportionate force, I have only this to say: You're damn right we are. Because if your cities were shelled the way ours were, if your citizens were terrorized the way ours are, you would use much more force than we are using." He has also said, "One who goes to sleep with rockets shouldn't be surprised if he doesn't wake up in the morning."

On 24 July, it was reported that Army Chief of Staff Halutz, according to a "senior officer", had issued orders to destroy 10 multi-story buildings in southern Beirut for every rocket fired on Haifa. The same day the IAF/IDF confirmed it had destroyed ten buildings in Beirut, including what it described as "a vital target", but the nature of the target was not revealed. In response to the press reports, the IDF Spokesperson's Office first released a statement saying that reporters had misquoted "the senior officer", but later issued a new statement saying that the officer in question had made a mistake and was wrong in claiming that Halutz had issued such a "retaliation" directive.

On 26 July, during a security cabinet meeting headed by Prime Minister Ehud Olmert, the Israeli Justice Minister Haim Ramon is reported by The Daily Telegraph to have said that any civilians remaining in southern Lebanon after having received warning leaflets should be considered "terrorists".

Eli Yishai, Israel's Vice Prime Minister and member of Israel's Security Cabinet, explained: "If Hezbollah fires Katyushas, we have to deliver a severe blow to Lebanon's infrastructure, black out Beirut, cut off electricity, turn off the water, destroy bridges, halt industry and flatten entire villages. If there is horrible damage in Lebanon, they will say, 'The Jews are crazy'" He also said: "If one has to choose between hurting the Israeli home front or the Lebanese home front, I prefer that the Lebanese get hurt. It hurts me to see civilians hurt by our air force, but there is no choice. We cannot be bleeding hearts while our citizens are being hurt. If Lebanese citizens pay the price, they will rise up against Hezbollah."

On 27 July, Professor Asa Kasher, author of the IDF's Code of Conduct, said that the IDF may be "morally justified" to "obliterate areas with high concentrations of terrorists, even if civilian casualties result."

On 6 August, in reference to European Union criticism of civilian casualties resulting from IDF activity in Lebanon, Prime Minister Olmert said, "Where do they [European Countries] get the right to preach to Israel? European countries attacked Kosovo and killed 10,000 civilians. 10,000! And none of these countries had to suffer before that from a single rocket. I'm not saying it was wrong to intervene in Kosovo. But please: Don't preach to us about the treatment of civilians." According to Human Rights Watch, 500 civilians were killed during the Kosovo War in attacks confirmed to have been carried out by NATO forces. However, the Yugoslav government claimed that the bombings resulted in between 1,200 and 5,700 civilian casualties, and some sources put the death toll as high as 18,000.

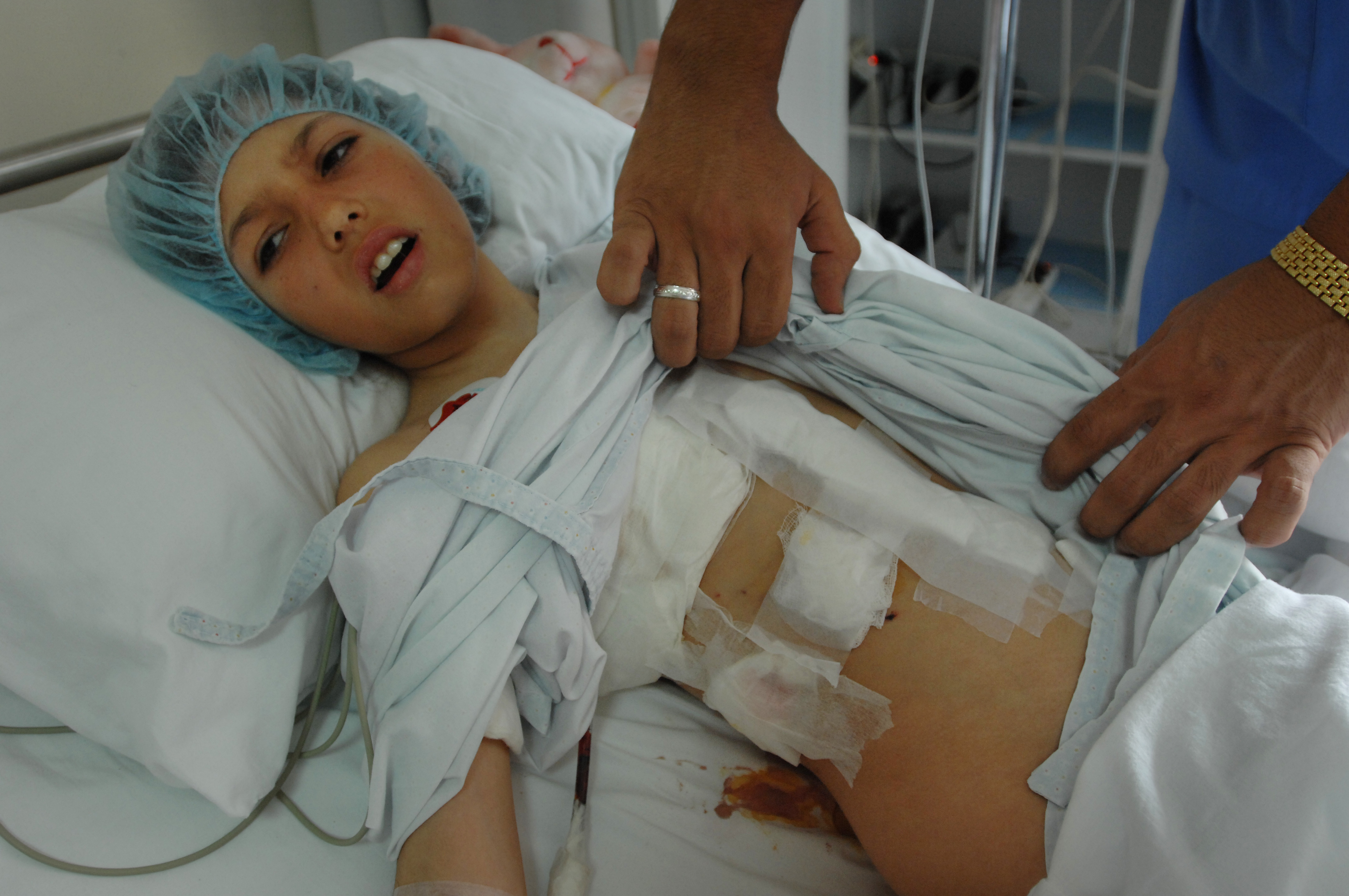
Lebanese girl injured by a cluster bomblet in 2006

An anonymous IDF rocket battery commander commented on the extent of the use of cluster bombs by saying "what we did was insane and monstrous, we covered entire towns in cluster bombs." An official IDF spokesman said, "International law does not include a sweeping prohibition of the use of cluster bombs. The convention on conventional weaponry does not declare a prohibition on phosphorus weapons, rather, on principles regulating the use of such weapons". The US government declared its intent to investigate whether Israel's use of US-made cluster bombs in southern Lebanon had violated secret agreements that restrict when it can employ such weapons. As of 6 September 2006, at least 13 people were killed and dozens injured after the ceasefire in Lebanon by unexploded ordnance. Most of the deaths resulted from the submunitions of cluster bombs. The United Nations had found 100,000 unexploded cluster bomblets at 359 sites by that time.

==== Advance warnings ====
The Israeli Air Force issued warnings to civilians prior to military actions by way of leaflet droppings to evacuate areas in which it was intending to strike against Hezbollah strongholds. These leaflets warned residents of southern Lebanon to evacuate an area approximately 32 km wide, giving civilian populations time to evacuate despite providing an early warning to the intended target, Hezbollah militants. The New York Times noted that "Israel has been careful to drop leaflets warning civilians in southern Beirut and southern Lebanon where it knows that Hezbollah keeps stores of rockets and launchers in apartment houses, garages and homes." Also, general leaflets explaining Israel's desire not to bring harm to the Lebanese populace were dropped, asking civilians to "[r]efrain from being located in places in relation to Hezbollah."

However, the Israeli drops of leaflets before bombings have come under criticism for being used as an excuse for airstrikes that may violate the rules of war and result in civilian deaths. According to Human Rights Watch, "in Qana and other villages in southern Lebanon, thousands of residents have been unable to leave the area because they are sick, wounded, do not have the means to leave or they fear Israeli attacks on vehicles".

The International Committee of the Red Cross said in a 30 July statement on the IDF's attack on Qana, "Issuing advance warning to the civilian population of impending attacks in no way relieves a warring party of its obligations under the rules and principles of international humanitarian law. In particular, the principles of distinction and proportionality must be respected at all times".

In an opinion column in the International Herald Tribune online, Peter Bouckaert, Senior Emergencies Researcher for Human Rights Watch, went even further in denouncing the Israeli policy, writing that "In Lebanon ... [t]ime after time, Israel has hit civilian homes and cars in the southern border zone, killing dozens of people with no evidence of any military objective."

On 6 August 2008, Yonatan Shapiro, a former Blackhawk helicopter pilot dismissed from reserve duty after signing a 'refusnik' letter in 2004, said that some Israeli fighter pilots had deliberately missed targets in order to avoid harming civilians, as disquiet grew in the military about flawed intelligence.

==== Attacks on ambulances and convoys ====
On 13 July three Red Cross volunteers were wounded when an ambulance was hit by IDF.

On 18 July the IDF attacked a convoy of ambulances and trucks operated by the United Arab Emirates Red Crescent (UAERC) on the road between Damascus and Beirut. One truck was destroyed, two were damaged and four passenger vehicles were damaged, causing injuries.

According to CNN's Paula Zahn on 24 July, the Red Cross said that "an Israeli missile hit two clearly marked Red Cross ambulances that were parked inside the Lebanese town of Qana evacuating civilians—the wounded included a 60-year-old woman and 12-year-old boy who's now in a coma." The ambulances were hit around 11:15 pm while wounded patients were being transferred from one ambulance to another. The ICRC recorded nine people including six Red Cross volunteers wounded in the attack. Australian Foreign Minister Alexander Downer made the allegation that these attacks were staged one month later, but was rebuked by the Red Cross for relying on an unverified internet blog in making his accusation. Israel has since said it "cannot tell for sure" if it hit the ambulances.

It was reported on 26 July that "at least 10 Lebanese ambulances bearing the emblem of the international red cross have [...] become targets in Israeli air strikes", resulting in the injury of six emergency workers. Additionally, an ambulance marked as belonging to the Shiite Amal militia was struck by Israeli aircraft fire near Tyre.

On 11 August it was reported that the IDF had wounded several aid workers during an airstrike that hit a Lebanese Red Cross ambulance in Tibnin, southeast of Tyre. It was also reported by Associated Press that an ambulance dispatched to deal with the casualties from the airstrikes against a civilian convoy originating in Marjayoun was also attacked. The Red Cross also confirmed that a Red Cross worker had been killed in the attack on the convoy.

==== Attacks on homes ====
This is not a comprehensive listing:

- On 1 August it was reported that around 250 properties had been hit by IDF air strikes in the Baalbek area. The BBC described many of the homes as having "no apparent connection with Hezbollah," although the Associated Press described the targets as "suspected Hezbollah positions."

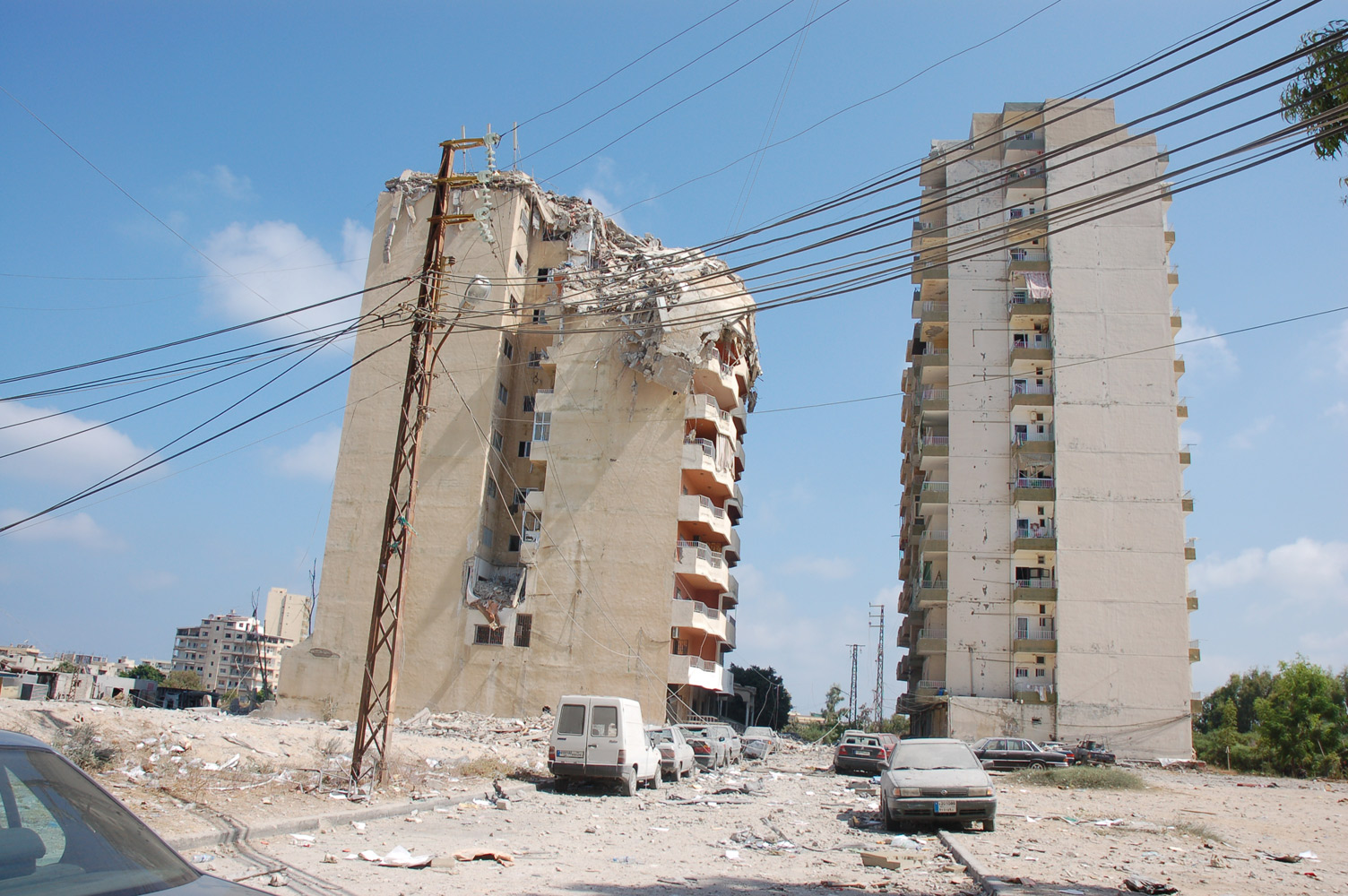
Aftermath of IDF attack on an apartment block in Tyre, Lebanon. Courtesy of Masser

- On 2 August, during the same day that the IDF captured five Hezbollah guerrillas in the Baalbek area, at least 12 people were killed in an air strike on the nearby village of Jammaliyeh. An IDF missile hit the home of the village's mayor, Hussein Jamaleddin, killing his son Ali, and six other relatives. The mayor, a reported political opponent of Hezbollah, survived the attack and witnesses said the building had apparently been attacked "randomly".
- On 6 August it was reported that a total of "2,000 bombs" had been dropped on the town of Aitaroun by the IDF almost destroying it completely.
- According to the Lebanese Health Minister, on 7 August at least 50 civilians were killed and eleven missing after an IAF missile "destroyed one residential building and damaged several others in the Shiyyah district of Beirut's southern suburbs." The initial toll of wounded was put at sixty.
- Also on 7 August the IAF targeted a building in Ghaziyeh. The attack killed fourteen civilians. The next day on 8 August a further attack on Ghaziyeh against a building which the IDF claimed housed a Hezbollah member took place during the funeral of the previous day's victims and killed a further one civilian. Forty minutes after this the IDF struck again and killed twelve other civilians in three separate bombings. A total of twenty-nine civilians.

The number of homes destroyed by the IDF was estimated by Hezbollah to be over 15,000 completely destroyed and many more damaged. Other estimates were of 10,000 homes in need rebuilding or repairing.

==== Attacks on Lebanese industry ====
According to a report by Lebanon's Council for Development and Reconstruction, "The government review shows that Israel has largely avoided some types of targets: major power plants, water treatment facilities, telephone systems, central government buildings and most factories. The bombing has focused on Shiite areas of southern Lebanon and the Beirut suburbs." Amnesty International have documented extensive Israeli strikes against Water treatment facilities, power plants, fuel depots, factories, supermarkets and bridges, among others.

== Allegations regarding various weaponry ==
=== Use of wide-dispersal-pattern weapons ===
==== Hezbollah's use ====
Hezbollah has launched rockets containing thousands of metal ball bearings towards Israeli towns and cities. (...) neither weapon should be used in or near civilian areas as a matter of international law, because the wide blast effects of these weapons cannot be directed at military targets without imposing a substantial risk of civilian harm and the weapons cannot distinguish between military targets and civilians. (...) Like cluster munitions, the use of rocket heads filled with metal ball bearings cannot be targeted precisely and are indiscriminate weapons when used in populated areas. Their use in rockets fired into populated areas appears intended to maximize harm to civilians."

— Human Rights Watch

Of Hezbollah, Human Rights Watch has said that the rocket attacks in civilian areas are at best indiscriminate, and at worst deliberate targeting due to their anti-personnel nature, which suggest a will to maximally harm civilians: "Some of the rockets launched against Haifa over the past two days contained hundreds of metal ball bearings that are of limited use against military targets but cause great harm to civilians and civilian property. The ball bearings lodge in the body and cause serious harm." Hezbollah "used Chinese-manufactured 122 mm rockets, carrying 39 sub-munitions that scattered hundreds of ball bearings, against Israel" in the 2006 Israel-Lebanon conflict. Many of these ball bearing rockets remain unexploded in the north of Israel.

==== Israel's use ====
Of Israel, Human Rights Watch has said there is evidence that Israel used cluster bombs too close to civilians, describing these weapons as "unacceptably inaccurate and unreliable weapons when used around civilians" and saying "they should never be used in populated areas." Human Rights Watch has accused Israel of using cluster munitions in an attack on Bilda, a Lebanese village, on 19 July which killed 1 civilian and injured 12, including seven children. The Israeli "army defended ... the use of cluster munitions in its offensive with Lebanon, saying that using such munitions was 'legal under international law' and the army employed them 'in accordance with international standards.'" Foreign Ministry Spokesman Mark Regev added, "[I]f NATO countries stock these weapons and have used them in recent conflicts – in Yugoslavia, Afghanistan and Iraq – the world has no reason to point a finger at Israel."

On 20 November 2006, the IDF Spokesman's Office said

"the use of cluster munitions against built-up areas was done only against military targets where rocket launches against Israel were identified and after taking steps to warn the civilian population."

According to Meron Rapoport, the statements contradict IDF previous claims regarding the use of cluster munitions.

On 5 September, Israel's Ministry on Foreign Affairs reported:

"Immediately after the cease-fire the IDF gave UNIFIL maps indicating the likely locations of unexploded ordnance, to aid the international attempt to clear these areas and avoid injury to the population. Furthermore, immediately after the cease-fire the IDF distributed warning notices to the residents in the areas of warfare, and recommended that they wait a few days before returning to the south until the UNIFIL forces were deployed there and the area had been cleared of unexploded ordnance."

On 1 December 2006, some three months later, Kofi Annan reported to the Security Council:

"Israel has yet to provide UNIFIL with the detailed firing data on its use of cluster munitions that referred to in my previous report. The provision of this data, which would be in keeping with the spirit of Protocol V of the CCW that recently went into force, would significantly assist operators on the ground mitigate the threat to innocent civilians. I reiterate my expectation for the provision of this data."

2015 VOA report about cluster bomblet clearance in Lebanon following the war

Unexploded cluster bombs dropped by Israeli warplanes or duds fired by artillery remain in much of South Lebanon, and have killed 12 people and wounded 39, according to Chris Clarke, head of the U.N. Mine Action Coordination Center attached to the United Nations Interim Force in Lebanon. These unexploded cluster munitions have created "mini-minefields" and the casualties include three Lebanese bomb disposal experts. The U.N. Mine Action Co-ordination Centre in Tyre claims cluster bombs were dropped by Israel in 267 separate locations in South Lebanon and are still killing returning refugees. The United States has opened an inquiry into Israel's use of cluster bombs, which are supplied by the United States. According to The New York Times this is to determine whether Israel had infringed secret rules that restrict where cluster bombs could be used.

On 6 October 2006, several weeks after the ceasefire, The New York Times reported that "Since the war between Israel and Hezbollah ended in August, nearly three people have been wounded or killed each day by cluster bombs Israel dropped in the waning days of the war, and officials now say it will take more than a year to clear the region of them. United Nations officials estimate that southern Lebanon is littered with one million unexploded bomblets, far outnumbering the 650,000 people living in the region".

An October 2006 report by Landmine Action, "Foreseeable Harm", found that:

"Two months after the ceasefire of 14 August 2006, the contamination caused by cluster munitions was still exacting a daily toll in south Lebanon. Over this period an average of between 3 and 4 civilians had been killed or injured by unexploded submunitions every day – some 35% of these casualties were children. Civilian casualties will continue to rise as more and more people return to sift through the cluster munition infested rubble. Livelihoods have been destroyed, and desperately needed relief and rehabilitation has been impeded. Throughout southern Lebanon large areas of agricultural land are contaminated by failed but still potentially lethal 'submunitions'. In many affected areas farmers have not been able to safely harvest what was left of this summer's tobacco, wheat and fruit; late yielding crops such as olives will remain too dangerous to harvest by November and winter crops will be lost because farmers will be unable to plough their contaminated land to plant their grains and vegetables. Water and power supplies have been blocked and schools, roads, houses and gardens were still littered with unexploded submunitions when the field research for this report was undertaken one month after the ceasefire."

On 1 December 2006, U.N. Secretary-General Kofi Annan submitted a report to the Security Council president stating that, as of 20 November 2006, 822 cluster bomb strike sites had been recorded, with 60,000 cluster bomblets having been cleared by the UN Mine Action Coordination Center. On 28 January 2007, the State Department said that Israel may have violated agreements with the United States when it fired American supplied cluster munitions into civilian areas of southern Lebanon.

=== Use of white phosphorus weapons ===
On 16 July 2006, Lebanese President Émile Lahoud claimed that Israeli forces dropped "phosphorus incendiary bombs, which are a blatant violation of international laws ... against Lebanese civilians". Information Minister Ghazi Aridi also said, "Israel is using internationally prohibited weapons against civilians." As-Safir newspaper also ran a story about alleged use of unknown chemical weapons, citing a member of the "French Association of Cardiovascular Surgeons". Jawad Najem, a surgeon at a Tyre hospital, claims that he has treated patients with phosphorus burns. Other doctors in Southern Lebanon also suspect they are seeing phosphorus burns. On 24 July Lebanese President Émile Lahoud stated on France's RFI radio:"According to the Geneva Convention, when they use phosphorus bombs and laser bombs, is that allowed against civilians and children?" An IDF spokeswomen replied to the Lahoud's statement by saying, "Everything the Israeli Defense Forces are using is legitimate"

After conducting an investigation of the claims, Israel has "denied that charge and in a statement, the Israeli military said that all of its weapons and ammunition comply with the international law. For the record, under international law, white phosphorus is permitted." Dr. Sanjay Gupta, CNN senior medical correspondent, said:

"They have used [white phosphorus] for all sorts of different things including tracers for weapons, which is why I think it's allowed under a lot of international law. There's no test for it specifically and it's really present just about everywhere. It can be present in fertilizer as well. So it is very hard to test for. ... It's not something that people have outlawed in some way. It's present in a lot of different things."

Amnesty International also warned against "reports that Israel has used incendiary weapons, such as white phosphorus shells" It precised that:

"Protocol III on Prohibitions or Restrictions on the Use of Incendiary Weapons of the UN Convention on the Prohibition or Restrictions on the Use of Certain Conventional Weapons prohibits the use of such weapons against civilians. And it prohibits making any military objective located within a concentration of civilians the object of attack by incendiary weapons."

On 22 October, Israeli minister Jacob Edery said that the IDF had employed phosphorus munitions within the confines of international law, and stated that it was used in attacks against military targets in open ground.

=== Allegations of depleted uranium use ===
Amnesty International has called on Israel to consider refraining from the use of weapons with depleted uranium munitions, due to health risks. The effect of the radioactive dust created on impact is debated, though the weapon itself is considered "toxic and constitutes a health risk independent of any residual radioactivity" due to the nature of heavy metals.

Depleted uranium weapons have been cited in some studies as contributing factors in Gulf War syndrome and increases in birth defects amongst residents within contaminated areas – the issue of DU use has also been raised by the Lebanese Government in the past, although the effect is widely debated, and the World Health Organization has concluded that "under most circumstances, use of DU will make a negligible contribution to the overall natural background levels of uranium."

The accusations prompted criticism by HonestReporting for coming to conclusions prematurely, and resulted in an investigation by the United Nations Environment Programme (UNEP). On 8 November 2006, UNEP concluded that Israel had not used any form of Uranium-based weapons. Israelis and Israel advocates cite the article as an instance of "shoddy journalism", arising allegedly as a result of media sensationalism.

== Reactions to attacks ==
=== United Nations ===
UN's Secretary-General Kofi Annan criticized Israel for using cluster bombs, while Undersecretary-General for Humanitarian Affairs and Emergency Relief Coordinator Jan Egeland accused Israel of "completely immoral" use of the munitions in the country. Amnesty International stated on 30 August 2006 that it was "outrageous" that Israel had not yet provided maps indicating where cluster bombs were used, reiterating that their use "in the heart of where people live clearly violates the prohibition on indiscriminate attacks" and was therefore "a grave violation of international humanitarian law". On 1 September 2006 IDF said it would provide UNIFIL with maps of South Lebanon that indicated where bombs or other devices that did not explode may be found.

UN's Undersecretary-General for Humanitarian Affairs and Emergency Relief Coordinator Jan Egeland criticized Hezbollah for its alleged use of Lebanese civilians as "human shields", stating: "Consistently, from the Hezbollah heartland, my message was that Hezbollah must stop this cowardly blending ... among women and children.... I heard they were proud because they lost very few fighters and that it was the civilians bearing the brunt of this. I don't think anyone should be proud of having many more children and women dead than armed men". He called Hezbollah rocket attacks into northern Israel and Israeli aerial bombing in Lebanon violations of humanitarian law. He accused Hezbollah of "cowardly blending ... among women and children" and condemned their rumored pride at "having many more children and women dead than armed men."

UN's High Commissioner for Human Rights Louise Arbour expressed "grave concern over the continued killing and maiming of civilians in Lebanon, Israel, and the occupied Palestinian territory." She suggested that the actions of Israel and Hezbollah may constitute war crimes. Arbour called for Israel to obey the "principle of proportionality" and said, "Indiscriminate shelling of cities constitutes a foreseeable and unacceptable targeting of civilians.... Similarly, the bombardment of sites with alleged military significance, but resulting invariably in the killing of innocent civilians, is unjustifiable."

A Human Rights Council found no evidence regarding the use of "human shields" by Hezbollah. However, there was evidence of Hezbollah using UNIFIL and Observer Group Lebanon posts as deliberate shields for the firing of their rockets.

=== Amnesty International ===
Amnesty International condemned both Israel and Hezbollah and called for UN intervention, stating early on that the region "has seen a horrendous escalation in attacks against civilians and civilian infrastructure. Yet the G8 leaders have failed conspicuously to uphold their moral and legal obligation to address such blatant breaches of international humanitarian law, which in some cases have amounted to war crimes". Amnesty International later accused Israel of war crimes due to its assault on Lebanese civilian infrastructure.

Amnesty International has also accused Hezbollah of war crimes due to "deliberately failing to distinguish between civilian and military targets, and of wrongfully seeking to justify its barrage by claiming to be retaliating for Israel's attacks on Lebanese civilians". On 21 November 2006, Amnesty International released a report stating that there was not "conclusive evidence of intent" by Hezbollah to use the civilian population as "human shields" for its military activities.

=== Human Rights Watch ===
Human Rights Watch condemned what they considered to be indiscriminate use of force against civilians by both Israel and Hezbollah. They blamed Israel for systematically failing to distinguish between combatants and civilians, which may constitute a war crime, and accused Hezbollah of committing war crimes by the deliberate and indiscriminate killing of civilians by firing rockets into populated areas. The organization also strongly criticized Israel for using cluster bombs too close to civilians because of their inaccuracy and unreliability, and Hezbollah for filling its rockets with ball bearings, which "suggests a desire to maximize harm to civilians".

However, HRW's reporting on the war has been questioned. Edith Everett, an HRW board member, stated, "It seemed to me that there was a commitment to a point of view—that Israel's the bad guy here." More than a year after the war, by HRW's own admission, their reporting had been faulty on key incidents in distinguishing between Lebanese civilian casualties and Hezbollah enemy combatant casualties.

=== United States ===
US Secretary of State Condoleezza Rice described the war on Lebanon as part of "birth pangs of a new Middle East" and urged Israel to ignore calls for a ceasefire because it would be a "false promise if it simply returns us to the status quo".

=== United Kingdom ===
In response to American support and Israel's military tactics, Kim Howells, British Foreign Office minister, said in an interview with CNN, "I hope that the Americans understand what's happening to Lebanon: the destruction of the infrastructure, the death of so many children, and so many people. These have not been surgical strikes, and it's very, very difficult I think to understand the kind of military tactics that have been used. You know if they're chasing Hezbollah, well go for Hezbollah. You don't go for the entire Lebanese nation, and that's the difference."

=== ITIC Report ===
The Intelligence and Terrorism Information Center at the Center for Special Studies, a private research group headed by Reuven Erlich, a retired IDF colonel, organized a team of military intelligence experts and compiled a report in conjunction with lawyers from the Israeli army and Foreign Ministry. The 300-page report includes declassified photographs, documents, video images and prisoner interrogations and was translated by the American Jewish Congress who passed it to The New York Times, which had it published. It says that Hezbollah operated from civilian areas to deter the IDF and gain a propaganda advantage. The report also says that Hezbollah has been preparing for such an engagement for years, embedding its fighters and their weapons in the Shiite villages of southern Lebanon. Some cases the report documents include:

- Guerrillas stashing weapons in hundreds of private homes and mosques, having fighters transporting missiles closely follow ambulances, and firing rockets near UN monitoring posts.
- Hezbollah bases, weapons and ammunition stores hidden within civilian population centers in south Beirut, southern Lebanon and the Bekaa Valley.
- A truck with a multi-barreled missile launcher, presumably from Hezbollah, parking in a street, sandwiched between residential buildings
- In a Lebanese village, rockets are seen being fired from a launcher on the back of a truck. The truck then drives a short distance and disappears inside a building.
- Lebanese residents' comments of the activities of Hezbollah within civilian communities
- Interrogations with Muhammad Srour, a young Hezbollah fighter, revealed:
  - He had initially received training in Iran and was undergoing further training in eastern Lebanon's Bekaa Valley when the war broke out.
  - While transporting missiles, hidden in cloth, in and around a Lebanese village, he held a white flag.
- Hussein Suleiman, a Hezbollah fighter, explains how he had set up a rocket-firing position on the front porch of a house on the outskirts of a Lebanese town.
- Maher Kourani, a Hezbollah fighter, said group members had worn civilian clothes, tried never to show their weapons, and traveled in ordinary civilian cars.

Other than two villages, Erlich said that over all, Hezbollah did not coerce Lebanese villagers from leaving. He says instead, "Hezbollah was operating inside a supportive population, and cynically used them to further its own goals."

In Lebanon, a Hezbollah official denied the study's allegations, saying its military units were based outside towns and villages and had come into populated areas only when circumstances required it. "We tried to avoid having to fight among civilian areas, but when Israeli troops entered villages, we were automatically forced to fight them from inside these villages to defend it," said the official.

=== Individuals ===
==== Sympathetic toward Israel ====
Upon UN's High Commissioner for Human Rights Louise Arbour's statement that Israel is breaking international law, Alan Dershowitz, a professor at Harvard Law School, wrote:

"Arbour's knowledge of international law is as questionable as her understanding of morality. Virtually every democratic nation has been forced to bomb cities during wartime, especially when the enemy locates crucial military targets near population centres. Under Arbour's erroneous criteria for criminal prosecution, U.S. presidents Bush, Clinton, Nixon, Johnson, Eisenhower, Truman and Roosevelt, as well as British prime ministers Blair and Churchill, and numerous French, Russian, Canadian and other heads of state would be declared war criminals for causing the 'foreseeable' deaths of civilians while bombing legitimate military targets."

David B. Rivkin Jr. and Lee A. Casey wrote for The Washington Post:

"Unfortunately, heavy civilian casualties are the inherent and inevitable result of the type of asymmetric warfare deliberately waged by Hezbollah .... They intentionally operate from civilian areas, both to protect their military capabilities from attack and to increase civilian deaths, which can then be trumpeted for propaganda purposes. But the presence of a large civilian population does not immunize Hezbollah ... forces from attack. Responsibility for any additional civilian casualties must be attributed to those groups, not to Israel."

==== Critical of Israel ====
Robert Fisk, a correspondent for The Independent, said "Hezbollah is killing more Israeli soldiers than civilians and the Israelis are killing far more Lebanese civilians than they are guerrillas."

Mitch Prothero countered both Dershowitz's argument and that of Rivkin, Casey, Fisk, and Cook in an article published by Salon.com and widely cited elsewhere:

"My own reporting and that of other journalists reveals that in fact Hezbollah fighters -- as opposed to the much more numerous Hezbollah political members, and the vastly more numerous Hezbollah sympathizers -- avoid civilians. Much smarter and better trained than the PLO and Hamas fighters, they know that if they mingle with civilians, they will sooner or later be betrayed by collaborators -- as so many Palestinian militants have been... The targeting of civilian facilities may be the result of liberal definitions within the Israeli military as to what constitutes a Hezbollah target; Hezbollah's civilian wing is Lebanon's second largest employer, and its facilities include hospitals and schools, among other non-military assets. While employees may be on the Hezbollah payroll, they are not often if ever participants in or knowledgeable about Hezbollah military activity."

== See also ==
- 2006 Qana airstrike
- Al-Qaa airstrike
- Chyah airstrike
- Ghaziyeh airstrikes
- 2006 Marjayoun convoy incident
- Israeli war crimes
