= Timeline of the 2006 Lebanon War (early August) =

This is a timeline of the 2006 Lebanon War during early August.

== August 1 ==
IDF
- The IDF expands its ground operation, doubling its troops in Southern Lebanon.
- Israeli special operations forces conducted a large scale airborne attack on the Bekaa Valley.
- Israeli troops landed near the eastern Lebanese town of Baalbek, Lebanese security sources said, and the Israeli military also engaged in fierce fighting with Hezbollah forces just across the border with Lebanon. Israeli aircraft flew support missions as troops hit the ground about 10 kilometers (6.2 mi) north of Baalbek in the Bekaa Valley near the Syrian border, the sources said. The Lebanese army also reported heavy helicopter traffic east and west of the town, the northernmost ground operation for Israel during the nearly three-week conflict.
- Israeli troops entered Hikma Hospital in northern Baalbek, where they checked the identification cards of all staff and patients, the sources said, adding that there was no indication that anyone was taken from the hospital. Witnesses, however, said "several" people were taken out of the hospital.
- The Israel Defense Forces confirmed that Israeli troops operating in Baalbek hit a number of militants and arrested some of them, although no numbers were given. There were no injuries among Israeli soldiers, the IDF said, and the arrested militants were taken to Israel.
- Today's fighting was concentrated near the Lebanese villages of Tayba, just outside the Israeli town of Metula, and Ayta ash-Shab further west. The IDF said three of its soldiers were killed and 25 wounded in the fighting in Ayta ash-Shab. Five other soldiers were wounded on the Israeli side of the border when they were hit by a mortar shell, it said. In two days of fighting, the IDF said forces have killed or wounded more than 20 Hezbollah fighters across southern Lebanon. Hezbollah said four of its forces died in Tuesday's fighting. * Just outside the village, the U.N. Interim Force in Lebanon reported intensive Israeli shelling in the villages of Ramia, Dibil and Qawzah in the morning. In Tayba, the IDF said it took control of several strategic positions that it said have been used by Hezbollah fighters to launch missiles at northern Israel. East of Tayba, Israeli forces Tuesday heavily shelled the town of Kfar Kela a day after pounding it with airstrikes, according to U.N. observers. Israeli forces have also been operating in the areas of Odaise and Rab Talateen for the past two days, according to the IDF. To the west, U.N. officials said, Israel gunboats in the Mediterranean Sea pounded southern Lebanon.
- Israel said it has killed 300 of the estimated 2,000 Hezbollah fighters in Lebanon during its three-week offensive.
Israel
- At the graduation ceremony at the National Security College in Glilot, Israeli Prime Minister Ehud Olmert said:
  "This war cannot in any way be measured by the number of missiles or the range of missiles that are still being fired at us. Not for a moment, not from day one did the defense minister, myself or the Israeli government – and I must say in its support – the military leadership as well – did anyone promise the people of Israel that at the end of this campaign there would be no missiles with a range capable of reaching the State of Israel. No one has the power to make such a promise."
- The Israeli Security Cabinet earlier in the day had approved an expansion of Israel's three-week-old military campaign in Lebanon.
- Ehud Olmert further said Israeli forces were weakening Hezbollah daily and that no cease-fire would come until Israel was safe from a future war. "Every additional day is a day that drains the strength of this cruel enemy," Olmert said."Quite a few days of fighting are still before us," Olmert told a conference of local officials.
- Israeli police reported 14 cross-border strikes hitting northern Israel, two using Katyusha rockets and 12 using mortar shells.
- Israeli Deputy Prime Minister Shimon Peres, in Washington to meet with Secretary of State Condoleezza Rice, told reporters the end of the war was "not far away." "You can count it in matters of weeks, not months," he said. But Rice saw the process going more quickly. "Certainly we are talking about days not weeks before we are able to get a cease-fire," she said on PBS' "NewsHour."
- Despite an overall decrease in attacks in the last two days, Haim Ramon said the Lebanese militia has increased the number of rocket launches from areas north of the Litani River – about 20 miles (32 km) from the border—where the Israeli military has asked residents in two locations to evacuate. In its initial quest to create a security buffer to protect northern Israel from Katyusha rockets, the Israeli military said it wanted Hezbollah fighters to push back to the Litani River.
United Nations
- The permanent five members of the Security Council—France, Russia, China, the United Kingdom and the United States—met with Secretary-General Kofi Annan to discuss how to stop the fighting between Israel and Hezbollah, deliver aid to civilians and send a multinational force into the area. One option being discussed is deploying a rapid-reaction force after a cessation of hostilities is established, U.N. and diplomatic sources said, speaking on condition of anonymity because talks are ongoing. The rapid-reaction force would secure certain areas and facilitate aid shipments into south Lebanon, one diplomat said, adding that after a political agreement and permanent cease-fire are worked out, a more expanded group of peacekeepers would be deployed.
Hezbollah
- A Hezbollah spokesman said 43 of its fighters have been killed, Reuters news service reported. "Hezbollah has taken a serious beating, and that is why the pressure of a ground offensive will produce the expected results," Israeli Justice Minister Haim Ramon said on Israeli Channel 10.
- Hezbollah said its fighters managed to destroy an Israeli warship of the coast of Tyre, though Israel disputed the claim. It issued a statement saying that the IDF had killed three Hezbollah fighters during fighting around Kfar Kila, Adaisse, and Taibeh, near the Lebanese town of Marjayoun. Hezbollah gave its fatalities since July 13 as forty-eight in total. While the IDF reported four Hezbollah dead.

== August 2 ==
IDF
- After air strikes on the town of Baalbek, 100 km into Lebanon, in which 11 people died, Israeli commandos landed by helicopters and fought a lengthy gun battle.
- The IDF concludes its formal investigation of the Qana airstrike.
- Israeli jets also pounded a Lebanese army position west of Sidon, killing a soldier and injuring several others, according to the Lebanese army. Early in the day, an airstrike hit the village of Al Jamaliyeh as the IDF was raiding a nearby hospital in Baalbek, The Associated Press reported. Israel's military released video that it said proved the Baalbeck hospital was a Hezbollah headquarters. Hezbollah disputed the account. Israeli special forces captured five militants and killed 10 others, Israel's army said. Hezbollah, however, said Israel arrested five civilians who were not members of the Islamic militia. Israeli video of the scene appeared to show weapons that Israeli soldiers discovered during a search of the hospital, located about 70 miles (110 km) north of the Israeli border. "The IDF and the air force demonstrated their long arm, their ability to reach everywhere that Hezbollah sees fit to situate itself, even if it chooses a hospital as its headquarters," said Israeli Brig. Gen. Yohanan Loker. Other images showed Israeli commandos rifling through file cabinets in an office inside the hospital, where the IDF said it found ammunition and weapons.
- A missile hit the home of Mayor Hussein Jamaleddin, killing his son, brother and five other relatives, according to AP. "Where is the press? Where is the media to see this massacre? Count our dead. Count our body parts," Jamaleddin told AP. Also, a mother, father and their five children were killed in another air raid near Al Jamaliyeh and a van driver was killed when a missile struck nearby, witnesses told AP.
- Late in the day there was a battle between Israeli forces and Hezbollah guerrillas near Ayta ash-Shab in southern Lebanon.
- Israel's military reported 55 deaths—including 19 civilians—and 580 injuries during the conflict. Israeli media are reporting around 6,000 Israeli soldiers are operating in southern Lebanon, but the IDF would not confirm the reports.
- In Gaza, where Israel is engaged in another military operation after militants there kidnapped an Israeli soldier, an airstrike hit a group of militants who were approaching Israeli forces with rocket-propelled grenades, the IDF said. Two Hamas militants were killed in the blast and another died in a separate incident, Palestinian security sources said. Palestinian security sources also reported clashes in Rafah, near the Gaza-Egypt border, after Israeli tanks rolled into the city. It marks the first time Israel has entered Rafah since the conflict in Gaza began June 25.
Hezbollah
- In a statement on al-Manar television, Hezbollah said those captured in Baalbek, one of its strongholds, are "ordinary citizens" not militants.
- Hezbollah fighters launch more than 230 rockets into Israel from Lebanon, the biggest single-day barrage since the conflict began.
- The Shiite militant group pounded northern Israel with rockets, killing a civilian and wounding seven others, the IDF said. One rocket landed in the Palestinian-controlled area of the northern West Bank, marking the southernmost point Hezbollah rockets have reached from southern Lebanon, Israeli police said.
Lebanon
- Lebanese authorities reported 603 civilians and soldiers have been killed and 2,145 others have been wounded in the Israeli military campaign. The Israeli military operation has displaced almost 900,000 people and has caused $2 billion in damage to the Lebanese infrastructure—not counting damage to buildings—according to the Lebanese government.
United Nations
- On the diplomatic front, the U.N. Security Council could consider a resolution on Lebanon as early as August 3, British Ambassador Emyr Jones Parry said. "I'm confident that by tomorrow we'd be in a position to have a discussion in the council on a text that takes us forward. The prospects now of the adoption soon of a resolution have improved considerably," he told reporters. U.S. Ambassador John Bolton said countries differed on how to make a possible cessation of violence permanent, "but there is near complete agreement on the fundamental, political framework that has to be put in place."

== August 3 ==
Human Rights Watch
- Human Rights Watch accuses Israel of committing war crimes for systematically failing to distinguish between combatants and civilians in their attack on Lebanon.
Hezbollah
- Eight civilians are killed by rocket attacks in Northern Israel and four IDF soldiers are killed in Southern Lebanon in what was referred to as "the deadliest day for Israel in its two-front war"
- Hezbollah's leader Sayyed Hassan Nasrallah warned that the group would launch rockets at Tel Aviv if Israel attacked the central parts of Beirut. Nasrallah stated: "If you strike Beirut, the Islamic resistance will strike Tel Aviv and it is able to do so." Nasrallah also proclaimed that Hezbollah would end its rocket attacks against Israel if it (in turn) stopped attacking Lebanon. It was unclear if Nasrallah's address was live or taped. Nasrallah also offered an olive branch in his lengthy statement, saying Hezbollah would stop rocket attacks on Israel if Israel stops its attacks in Lebanon. "You attack our cities, our villages, our civilians, our capital, we will react," he said. "At any time you decide to stop your aggressions on our villages and towns and cities and our civilians, we will not hit any settlement or any Israeli city." His comments came shortly after media reports that Israel's defense minister has ordered generals to prepare to push up to 18 miles (29 km) into Lebanon, up to the Litani River, The Associated Press reported. Cabinet approval would be needed for the advance, Israeli media reported.
- Hezbollah pounded northern Israel with more than 200 rockets, killing eight people and injuring several, Israeli police said, after Israel resumed airstrikes on Beirut's suburbs. Four were killed in Akko, Israel, just north of Haifa, and three died in the Maalot area, which is closer to the Lebanese border, police said. Nasrallah said in his TV address that his forces were inflicting "maximum casualties" on Israeli ground troops.
IDF
- Late, Israeli warplanes dropped leaflets over several neighborhoods in the area warning residents to leave "for your own safety." The leaflets warned of an expansion of the Israeli campaign in Beirut because Hezbollah continues to fire rockets into Israel and because of statements made by Hezbollah leader Hassan Nasrallah. "The expansion of terrorist operations by Hezbollah will lead to a painful and harsh response and the results will be painful not only for Hassan's gang and its criminals," the leaflets read. Israeli military sources told that if Hezbollah did strike Tel Aviv, Israel would target the Lebanese infrastructure. A spokesman for Israeli Defense Minister Amir Peretz declined comment.
- Israeli forces are now stationed across 11 villages in southern Lebanon, according to the IDF, trying to clear Hezbollah from a five-mile-wide security zone before any international peacekeepers are deployed, AP reported.
- As of August 3, Israel has reported 68 deaths, including 27 civilians. Overnight, the Israel Defense Forces said it pounded Hezbollah targets across Lebanon with 120 airstrikes. Three Israeli soldiers were killed in today's fighting in southern Lebanon, the IDF said. The IDF said its ground forces killed four Hezbollah fighters in the western part of southern Lebanon. Powerful explosions shattered the early morning peace in Beirut—airstrikes which announced a resumption of attacks on Hezbollah strongholds in the city's southern suburbs. The strikes began just after 2 a.m. local time. The Israel Defense Forces confirmed it was targeting Hezbollah sites in southern Beirut.
United States
- U.S. Secretary of State Condoleezza Rice told that Israelis "have their own capabilities to deal with these threats." "The international community needs to say to Hezbollah that these kinds of threats are also not helpful at a time when the international community, the Lebanese people, the Israeli people, all want an end to the hostility," she told "Larry King Live".
Lebanon
- Lebanese officials reported four civilian deaths from Israeli missile strikes in south Lebanon, according to the AP. As of mid-3 August 642 Lebanese civilians and soldiers have died and 2,303 have been wounded in the three-week-old Israeli military offensive against the Hezbollah militia, according to Lebanon's Internal Security Forces. Lebanese Prime Minister Fouad Siniora said more than 1 million people, a quarter of Lebanon's population, have been displaced, according to Associated Press.
United Nations
- On the diplomatic front, France circulated a revised draft resolution for the United Nations Security Council calling for an immediate halt to Israeli-Hezbollah fighting and spelling out conditions for a permanent cease-fire in Lebanon. The U.S. State Department said it hoped for a cease-fire resolution by August 4, but U.S. diplomats were prepared to work until August 5 and 6 to achieve a deal. A sticking point has been the timing of a cease-fire. France and other European countries support Lebanon's call for an immediate cease-fire. The United States and the United Kingdom have said an immediate cease-fire would not eliminate the long-term threat that Hezbollah imposes on Israel. British Prime Minister Tony Blair earlier that an agreement on a cease-fire resolution could come within days. U.N. diplomats are discussing a two-pronged solution to ending the conflict. The first step would be the cessation of hostilities followed by the deployment of a rapid-reaction force to southern Lebanon, according to U.N. and diplomatic sources speaking on condition of anonymity because talks were ongoing. Then, a more expanded group of peacekeepers would be deployed with a mandate to enforce a more permanent cease-fire and establish a buffer zone, the sources said.

== August 4 ==
IDF
- 33 civilian farm workers are killed and 20 wounded after Israeli airstrike in a farm near Qaa in Lebanon, close to the Lebanon-Syria border in the Beqaa valley A hospital official and the mayor said all the casualties were Syrian workers, and security forces said most of the casualties were employees or truck drivers. The IDF said it targeted two buildings that contained weapons. The Israeli government has accused Hezbollah of using civilians as shields, but Human Rights Watch, in a report released after investigating dozens of civilian deaths, concluded the opposite of IDF claims.
- Israel bombs a house in the frontline Taibeh village in south Lebanon killing seven civilians and wounding 10.
- Israeli aircraft destroyed four bridges on the main coastal highway north of Beirut, disrupting efforts to aid civilians displaced or trapped by the conflict. After bombing the last land routes into Beirut, and effectively cutting off the Lebanese capital from relief supplies, Israel issued a statement saying the attacks were designed to thwart Syrian attempts to arm Hezbollah." "Syria is determined to continue rearming Hezbollah and supply it with weaponry used to attack Israel," said an IDF statement. "The IDF is determined to stop this flow of arms to Hezbollah. The attacks on the bridge last night, which connect Syria and Lebanon, were to this end."
- The IDF denied the report of a Lebanese official who said Israel was blocking two fuel tankers in the Mediterranean from docking in Lebanon, and Israeli Ambassador to the United Nations Dan Gillerman said Israel is working with the U.N. to keep supplies flowing into Lebanon.
- The IDF said the two or three rockets were among more than 200 that landed across northern Israel. The most deadly attack came in Tiberias, where three civilians were killed. The IDF put the Israeli death toll at 74, including 30 civilians. Israeli authorities say more than 600 people have been injured.
Hezbollah
- A rocket hits the Israeli city of Hadera, 80 kilometers south of the border and the deepest rocket attack into Israel since the conflict began.
Syria
- Syria has repeatedly denied supplying weapons to Hezbollah. "Hezbollah does not need any logistic support from Syria," Syria's ambassador to the United States, Imad Moustapha, said on Fox News. Moustapha also alleged that Israel had bombed the roads to close escape routes to Lebanese civilians seeking "safe haven."
Lebanon
- Meanwhile, Lebanese President Emile Lahoud accused Israel of "starving" his country, and Christiane Berthiaume of the World Food Programme told The Associated Press that Israel had cut "Lebanon's umbilical cord." "This [road] has been the only way for us to bring in aid. We really need to find other ways to bring relief in," Berthiaume told the AP. The bridge attacks left three people dead and one missing, according to the Lebanese Red Cross. Traffic was paralyzed around the capital, as Lebanese Internal Security Forces closed even the unscathed roads to traffic, fearing new strikes, the Lebanese Broadcasting Corporation reported. At sea, there were more problems with delivering supplies, according to a Lebanese official who said Israel was blocking two fuel tankers in the Mediterranean from docking in Lebanon. Lahoud did not concur and told the AP that Israel is trying to strong-arm Lebanon into accepting its terms for a cease-fire.
- Across Lebanon, dozens died in Israeli attacks, as Hezbollah rockets struck Hadera, the southernmost point the Islamic militia has reached with its attacks thus far in the conflict. No injuries were reported, police said. Hadera is about 25 miles (40 km) north of Tel Aviv, which Hezbollah leader Hassan Nasrallah threatened August 3 to strike in retaliation for Israeli attacks on Beirut. On the Lebanese side of the border, AP quoted Lebanese security officials as saying that Israeli airstrikes buried 57 people under rubble after flattening homes in two villages near the Israeli border, Taibeh and Aita al-Shaab. No other details were immediately available.
- As of this day, 675 Lebanese civilians and soldiers have died in the conflict, and 2,327 have been wounded, according to Lebanon's Internal Security Forces.
United Nations
- As the death toll continued to rise, the United States and France were making headway on a U.N. Security Council draft resolution that could come to a vote August 7 or August 8 next week, State Department officials and diplomatic sources said. The resolution would call for a cease-fire between Israel and Hezbollah and deployment of a rapid-reaction force in southern Lebanon until a larger peacekeeping operation could be organized, said diplomatic sources familiar with the plan. U.S. and French diplomats are still hammering out details, including whether Israeli forces would remain in Lebanon after a cessation of hostilities, an exchange of prisoners, and the creation of a political framework to make sure the cease-fire lasts, U.S. and diplomatic sources said.
United States
- Despite calls from U.N. Secretary-General Kofi Annan and many nations, the United States has not publicly endorsed an immediate cessation of hostilities.

== August 5 ==
IDF
- Israeli commando soldiers landed in Tyre, where fighting erupted with Hezbollah forces. Israeli forces were supported by air strikes from helicopter gunships and fighter-bombers. One commando was killed while 4 others were injured. Fighting continued amid the negotiations. Israel sent commandos to attack a suspected rocket-launching site in Tyre and launched airstrikes elsewhere in the country. Israeli commandos dropped from helicopters to attack a five-story building in the northern part of the Lebanese port city of Tyre, witnesses said. Israel ordered the commando raid rather than an airstrike to avoid civilian casualties, the military said. "The apartment was being used by two [to] three senior Hezbollah terrorists who operated a cell responsible for the launching of long-range missiles, including those fired into Hadera," the IDF said in an official statement, referring to the Israeli town struck on August 4. "The members of the cell were killed and several IDF soldiers were injured by gunfire and grenade shrapnel," the IDF said in a statement. Smoke billowed from the building after the raid, witnesses said. Israeli soldiers carried away four bodies, according to a woman living in an apartment nearby. "Everyone we wanted to kill, we killed," an Israeli official told. Israeli airstrikes also pounded Beirut early in the day. At least six explosions were heard in the southern suburbs. The attacks came on the heels of Israeli bombing of the last land routes into the city, effectively cutting it off from relief supplies. The IDF say at least 78 Israelis have been killed during the conflict, including 45 soldiers, and more than 600 wounded.
- In the morning there were a bombing of the last land routes into Beirut, which had started on August 4, and effectively cutting off the Lebanese capital from relief supplies, Israel issued a statement saying the attacks were designed to thwart Syrian attempts to arm Hezbollah."
United Nations
- The U.N. Security Council met for several hours with no word on the fate of a draft resolution to halt the 25-day war between Israel and Hezbollah in Lebanon. The proposal is backed by the United States – Israel's strongest ally – and France, which historically has close ties to Lebanon. U.S. Ambassador to the United Nations John Bolton called the draft a "fusion" of ideas. He said the plan would put in place "a lasting solution for the problem. Obviously this resolution alone isn't that solution, but it's the beginning." "What we all fundamentally want to do ... is not return to the status quo ante," Bolton said to reporters after the meeting began at 3 pm. ET. "We want this to be a transformational solution that moves the region beyond the problem that has existed for so many years." It may be several days before the 15-member council votes on the plan to address the violence, which has killed more than 750 people in Lebanon and Israel. Implementing a peace plan would require cooperation on the ground. British Prime Minister Tony Blair said the draft resolution was a "vital first step" that could lead to the cessation of hostilities "literally within the next couple of days." He said from London that the goal was "to put the government of Lebanon fully and properly in control of the whole of Lebanon, so that Lebanon can get back on its feet and Israel can be secure." A major sticking point has been Israel's objection to the use of the U.N. Interim Force in Lebanon to keep the peace. UNIFIL was created to confirm Israel's withdrawal from Lebanon in 1978. Critics say the force is too weak.
Lebanon
- Lebanon Prime Minister Fouad Siniora said, however, that the resolution-draft was "not adequate." The Lebanese army said one of its soldiers was killed and another wounded in an exchange of fire with Israeli soldiers. In Lebanon, 683 Lebanese, mostly civilians, have been killed in the conflict and more than 2,359 people have been wounded, Lebanese Internal Security Forces reported.
Hezbollah
- Hezbollah quickly responded, too, saying it will agree to a cease-fire only when all Israeli soldiers leave Lebanese land. The draft resolution makes no mention of a withdrawal. By 5:30 pm, 170 rockets had struck northern Israel, Israeli police said. An Israeli woman and her two adult daughters were killed when Hezbollah rockets struck the area of Shlomi in western Galilee, ambulance services said. Thirteen people were injured, one seriously. Rockets also struck Haifa, hitting two houses and wounding nine people, police said. In Kiryat Shmona, two people were slightly wounded, Israeli authorities told. In addition, a Hezbollah mortar killed an Israeli soldier when it struck his vehicle in southern Lebanon, the Israel Defense Forces said. A barrage of rockets also struck Syrian territory, the second such hit, an IDF spokesman said. Hezbollah disputed the Israeli assessment concerning the Tyre-raid on a five-story building, "that everyone they wanted to kill, they killed", saying it had successfully repulsed the raid and killed a naval commando, while wounding three others.
United States
- The United States has been roundly criticized for not calling for an immediate halt to hostilities. U.S. Secretary of State Condoleezza Rice says the United States does not oppose a cease-fire but does not want an agreement that "falls apart practically the minute it's in place" and would then result in a return "to the status quo ante," or the relationship between the two sides before fighting began.

== August 6 ==
IDF
- Israel struck Tyre early morning after peppering the streets with leaflets warning that Hezbollah positions would be targeted, Arabic-language network Al Jazeera reported.
- Israeli air strikes killed at least five people in the village of Ansar near the port of Sidon. Three other Lebanese civilians were killed when an Israeli missile hit a private house in Naqoura. Bridges and roads in other places in Lebanon were also targeted and destroyed. Two roads linking the Bekaa plain with Beirut and northern Lebanon were also hit, as well as two bridges in the Akkar province.
- A missile launcher that fired rockets into Haifa was later destroyed in an Israeli airstrike in the Lebanese town of Qana.
- The Israeli military also bombed Beirut's southern suburbs and other parts of Lebanon, killing at least eight civilians in airstrikes that were reported by Lebanese security officials or Arabic-language TV networks.
- Arab-language networks reported targeted cities as: Al Jabal Al Rafeea, Al-Jarmak, Mahmoudiya, Majra Al Letani, El-Qlaileh, Ras el Biyada, Mansouri, Milikiya, Shaitaye, Hosh and areas in Khiyam.
- The Israeli military said it has captured a Hezbollah militant responsible for kidnapping two Israeli soldiers in a cross-border raid last month. July 12 kidnappings ignited the fighting between Israel and Hezbollah. The IDF said the detained militant confessed to his role during interrogation by the Israeli military. "We think they were captured on our land without any reason, and we don't feel that we have to compensate the Hezbollah because they took hostage two of our soldiers," he told." "But if then Lebanon would like to talk about exchange of prisoners, we are always ready to."
- Capt. Guy Spigelman, an IDF spokesman, defended the progress of the Israeli campaign, saying Hezbollah had amassed an arsenal of about 10,000 rockets over the past six years. About 3,000 of those have been fired at Israel so far, many of them from hiding places "in and around villages and suburbs and living rooms and garages of the people of Lebanon." "It's going to take time to get rid of all those missiles," he said.
- Since fighting began July 12, more than 95 Israelis have been killed, more than half of them soldiers, according to Israeli officials.
Israel
- Haifa Mayor Yona Yahav told that Jews and Arabs have lived together in Haifa for more than a century, and "nothing can jeopardize the harmony."
- Israeli police said 100 others were injured, including those treated for shock. Police said the missiles that hit Haifa were Syrian 220 mm rockets, with warheads weighing about 45 kilograms (99 pounds).
- In addition to Haifa and Kfar Giladi, rockets also struck Kiryat Shmona and open areas across Galilee in northern Israel, an Israeli police spokesman said.
Hezbollah
- Twelve Israeli reservists were killed when a Hezbollah rocket hit Kfar Giladi in northern Israel; eight other people were injured in the attack. At least 15 people were injured in the missile attacks, some of them seriously. The attack was the single deadliest Hezbollah rocket attack on northern Israel since hostilities began in July 2006.
- Hezbollah launched 5 rockets against Haifa. 3 people were killed and at least 40 people were injured in the attack. The rockets hit residential areas in the city, and at least one building collapsed.
- A Hezbollah rocket hit the headquarters of the Chinese UNIFIL contingent, injuring three Chinese peacekeepers.
- Hezbollah militants fired more than 180 rockets into northern Israel, killing three civilians in Haifa and 12 Israeli reservists who had just been called up to fight in Lebanon, according to Israeli officials.
- Hezbollah says it will agree to a cease-fire only when all Israeli soldiers leave Lebanese land.
Syria
- Syria's foreign minister stated that Syria's army had standing orders to respond immediately to any Israeli attacks: "If Israel attacks Syria by any means, on the ground, in the air, our leadership ordered the armed forces to reply immediately."
Lebanon
- Lebanon's death toll exceeds 700, most of them civilians, and the number of wounded tops 2,700, Lebanese Internal Security Forces reported.
- Lebanese army sources said two of the strikes were in Haret Hreik, where Hezbollah's headquarters are located, and in Beer El-Abed.
- Also bombed by IDF were at least two camps of the Syrian-backed Popular Front for the Liberation of Palestine – General Command in southeastern Lebanon, The Associated Press quoted Lebanese officials as saying. No casualties were reported in either raid.
- Lebanon Prime Minister Fouad Siniora said the draft for an UN- resolution was "not adequate," and House Speaker Nabih Berri, who has served as a diplomatic conduit for Hezbollah, rejected the draft. The draft resolution, written by the United States and France, makes no mention of a withdrawal of Israeli forces from Lebanon.
United States
- U.S. Secretary of State Condoleezza Rice said she expects the United Nations will vote on a resolution "in the next day or two" that could bring a halt to the "large-scale violence."

== August 7 ==
IDF
- The airstrikes continued at daybreak, with explosions heard in the southern Lebanese port city of Tyre. Guy Spigelman said early that several rocket launchers in Tyre were destroyed overnight.
- Israeli planes attacked targets in southern Beirut and the eastern Bekaa valley. Ground fighting with Hezbollah-fighters was reported around Houla in the south of Lebanon. Israeli air strikes struck several houses in Houla during the fighting, and dozens of civilians were feared buried under the rubble. Reports stipulated that at aircraft first destroyed a house where 17 people were hiding in the village. Other strikes a short time later hit two nearby houses where about 30 other people were staying. At the beginning Lebanon's prime minister falsely stated that 40 civilians had been killed, but later had to apologize and admit there was just one killed. The IDF said it has warned residents for the past two weeks to leave.
See also: 2006 Ghaziyeh airstrikes and 2006 Shiyyah airstrike
- Israel stated that IDF-soldiers killed 14 Hezbollah fighters in fighting in southern Lebanon. 3 Israeli soldiers were wounded.
- An Israeli engineering unit were reported having blown up a Hezbollah headquarters located in southwestern Lebanon.
- 30 Israeli commandos landed on a hilltop overlooking Ras al-Biyada, south of Tyre, fighting Hezbollah-soldiers in close combat in a bid to destroy its rocket launchers.
- Israel Defense Forces says in a statement that they plan to increase their offensive in Lebanon in response to the rocket attacks on Israel August 6. A senior General Staff officer told that Israel now plans to attack strategic infrastructure targets and symbols of the Lebanese government.
- An Israeli strike hit a south Beirut street on the edge of the city's mostly Christian eastern district, killing forty one people and wounding 61. The strike hit a building near a mosque in the upscale southern suburb of Shiyyah. The strike came shortly after Israel warned residents south of Lebanon's Litani River to stay off roads after 10 pm, Israeli military sources said. The IDF warned residents it "intends to intensify its attack against Hezbollah."
- Israeli airstrike killed at least seven civilians near the southern city of Sidon, Lebanese officials said. The IDF in recent days had dropped leaflets on Sidon, urging civilians to evacuate.
Israel
- Prime Minister Ehud Olmert said that the Israel Defense Forces would have no limitations in the fight against rocket fire in the north, saying it was unacceptable that so many people were forced to exist in bomb shelters. "We have to stop the rockets," Olmert said during a visit to the Northern Command."We cannot have a million residents living in shelters. On this matter, there will be no limitations on the army. This war has involved fatalities, which hurts and is traumatic. This we know, but at the moment we have to cope with it, both on the battlefield and the home front. I will give you every strength and support, we are not stopping [the fight]."
- Israel is attempting to establish a buffer zone between Israel and the Litani – about 25 miles (40 km) from the border—to halt the Hezbollah cross-border rocket attacks./ Israel also said it had shot down a Hezbollah drone/ Israeli Prime Minister Ehud Olmert, in a taped address to an American Jewish charity, said Israel was prepared to pay "a terrible price" to battle Hezbollah now rather than face a strengthened foe later. Olmert called on the "solidarity and partnership" between Jewish communities overseas and the people of Israel for support./ Israel has long supported the idea of Lebanon's army taking control of the border from Hezbollah. But Israeli Foreign Ministry spokesman Mark Regev said Israel expects to see details presented at the United Nations, questioning whether Hezbollah would be disarmed.
Lebanon
- Lebanon proposed changes to a draft U.N. resolution aimed at halting the Israel-Hezbollah conflict that left some 800 people dead. Lebanon's government agreed to dispatch 15,000 troops to its southern border as part of a peace agreement if Israeli troops leave the country, a government spokesman said. Lebanon's proposed changes would have Israeli troops hand over their current positions to the U.N. Interim Force in Lebanon as they withdraw. UNIFIL then would hand over control to Lebanese forces within 72 hours and help them deploy, according to a draft of the Lebanese plan. And Lebanese troops would ensure "total respect of the cessation of hostilities in the area.
Hezbollah
- Hezbollah claims to kill three Israeli soldiers in the Lebanese town of Bint Jbeil. IDF confirmed only one initially, but published later that 2 more soldiers were killed in the fighting when their tank was hit by anti-tank-rockets.
- In Southern Lebanon at least 14 civilians died; more than 800 people have died up to now, most of them civilians.
- Hezbollah launched over 160 rockets at northern Israel. 70 rockets landed in or near the cities of Kiryat Shmona, Rosh Pina, Maalot, Nahariya, Safed, and Acre. Three people were wounded.
United Nations
- The draft U.N. resolution calls for "the immediate cessation by Hezbollah of all attacks and the immediate cessation by Israel of all offensive military operations." A second resolution would later establish an international peacekeeping force that would help Lebanon's army take control of the country's southern border, where Hezbollah has held sway since the Israeli withdrawal in 2000.
- UN Secretary General Kofi Annan made another appeal to Israel and Hezbollah "to respect their obligations under international humanitarian law," in a preliminary report on the July 30 attack in Qana. "The attack on Qana should be seen in the broader context of what could be, based on preliminary information available to the United Nations, including eyewitness accounts, a pattern of violations of international law, including international humanitarian law and international human rights law, committed during the course of the current hostilities," Annan stated.

== August 8 ==
IDF
- An Israeli soldier was killed and five others were wounded in heavy fighting between IDF troops and Hezbollah. The soldier was killed when Hezbollah fighters fired an anti-tank missile at an IDF "Puma" armored personnel carrier in the village of Dibel. Two Hezbollah fighters were killed in the fighting.
- Overnight combat between Israel and Hezbollah left one Israeli soldier dead and four wounded, officials said. It is the 28th day of fighting. Israeli forces killed four Hezbollah fighters in the village of Al Mansouri and three others in the villages of Bint Jbeil and Ramiya, the IDF said. According to the Israeli military, five guerrillas were taken prisoner in Bint Jbeil and Shihin. Bint Jbeil has been the scene of heavy fighting since the Israeli campaign began July 12, after Hezbollah captured two Israeli soldiers in a cross-border raid.The soldier's death brings the Israeli death toll in the nearly month-old conflict to 98, including 35 civilians killed by Hezbollah rocket attacks. The IDF reported 82 airstrikes in Lebanon overnight that targeted buildings, access routes and missile launchers. Security sources also said an Israeli warship off the coast fired on Shiyah at night, hitting a building near a mosque. In addition Israeli airstrikes hit the southern Lebanese town of Ghaziye, near Sidon, killing 14 civilians and wounding 33, Lebanon's security forces said. The attacks occurred as mourners were burying villagers killed in a bombing August 7, the AP and Reuters reported.
- In later fighting two IDF paratroopers were killed in battles in Bint Jbail. One of the paratroopers was treated by medics at the scene, but he could not be extricated due to heavy gunfire from Hezbollah militants. During the rescue attempt, a soldier from the paratroopers' search and rescue force was also killed.
- The Israeli military dropped leaflets over the southern Lebanese city of Tyre, warning of stepped-up operations and urging people not to drive on roads. One leaflet, which a Lebanese Broadcasting Corp. reporter showed on the air, said that "terrorist elements ... are using you as human shields by launching rockets toward the state of Israel from your homes." The translated leaflet continued, "All cars and of any type will be shelled if seen moving south of the Litani River because it will be considered a suspect of transferring rockets, military ammunitions and those causing destruction. The warning is in effect for all residents south of the Litani River. "You need to know that anyone moving in any type of car will put their life in danger."
Israel
- On the diplomatic front, Israeli Prime Minister Ehud Olmert termed "interesting" a Lebanese proposal to send 15,000 troops to its southern border, The Associated Press reported. But he also said the Israeli Security Cabinet on August 9 may consider expanding the offensive in southern Lebanon.
- The area of Tyre has been a launching point for Hezbollah's Katyusha rockets.
Hezbollah
- Hezbollah rocket fire wounded two people in Israel, police said. Rockets hit the towns of Safed, Kiryat Shmona and Maalot, and open fields near Akko, Tiberias, Safed and Nahariya, some setting fields ablaze and causing damage to buildings, police said. Hezbollah, after Israeli troops had handed over their current positions in southern Lebanon to the U.N. observer mission and UNIFIL then had handed over control to Lebanese forces within 72 hours (according to a draft of the Lebanese plan), would withdraw to positions north of the Litani River.
Lebanon
- Lebanon and its Arab League allies are pressing the United Nations to call for an immediate Israeli withdrawal as part of a deal to end the fighting. Such a withdrawal is not mentioned in a U.N. draft resolution by the United States and France, an omission that Lebanon's government and Arab League diplomats have called unacceptable. Lebanese Prime Minister Fouad Siniora's Cabinet, which includes two ministers from Hezbollah, made its decision on troop deployment unanimously, ministers said. The deployment of Lebanese national troops to the south is part of the U.S.- and French-backed peace plan under discussion at the United Nations. August 7 proposal does not call for Hezbollah to disarm, but the Cabinet said it would allow only Lebanese government troops and U.N. peacekeepers to operate south of the Litani River, Finance Minister Jihad Azour said. Lebanon prefers a single resolution that would deal with a cease-fire and all of the political issues rather than a two-phase approach that the Lebanese Embassy's chargé d'affaires in Washington, Carla Jazzar, said would give Hezbollah a pretext to continue fighting. The Lebanese proposal calls for Israel to hand over the disputed territory of Shebaa Farms to the United Nations, "pending delineation of the border." And it would bolster UNIFIL rather than creating a new peacekeeping force with more robust rules of engagement. In Lebanon, security forces put the death toll at more than 776, most of them civilians.
Red Cross
- The International Committee of the Red Cross has been exempted from the Israeli targeting of Tyre, said Roland Hueguenin-Benjamin, a spokesman for the group. He said the Red Cross has negotiated "freedom of movement" for its convoys, which have been providing aid to people in the region. Thousands of people are still believed to be living in shelters in southern Lebanon villages. While the Red Cross is allowed to bring ships into the Lebanese ports of Tyre and Sidon, he said, damaged roads have hindered the delivery of aid into the countryside. The president of the International Committee of the Red Cross accused Israel of violating the Geneva Conventions by preventing aid convoys from getting into areas targeted by Israeli airstrikes. The official, Jakob Kellenberger, demanded more access to civilians in southern Lebanon. He will meet with Israeli officials on August 9. "By letting down leaflets you cannot get rid of your responsibilities under international humanitarian law," Kellenberger said, referring to warnings the Israeli military has issued before airstrikes.
Médecins Sans Frontières
- The destruction of a main road and a makeshift bridge by airstrikes forced Médecins Sans Frontières (Doctors Without Borders) to bring supplies into the southern Lebanese city of Tyre by forming a human chain across the Litani River, said a spokesman for the aid group.
United States
- President Bush said he anticipates that Hezbollah and Israel will not agree with all aspects of a Mideast cease-fire resolution but said "we all recognize that the violence must stop." A spokesman for the U.S. State Department described the proposal as "significant," the Associated Press reported.
Arab League
- An Arab League delegation is at the United Nations at afternoon highlighting concerns about a draft resolution aimed at ending the conflict between Israel and Hezbollah in Lebanon. Yahya Mahmassani, the Arab League's representative at the United Nations, said that under the Lebanese plan, "Hezbollah will not go into that area, north of the Litani River, [once] the Lebanese forces are there."
Qatar
- Qatar, the only Arab member currently on the U.N. Security Council, said the draft is too vague and would create "a domestic problem" for Lebanon's government.
United Nations
- UNIFIL, after Israeli troops had handed over their current positions in southern Lebanon to the U.N. observer mission, would hand over control to Lebanese forces within 72 hours and help them deploy, according to a draft of the Lebanese plan. Intense talks followed the Security Council session.
Arab League
- An Arab League delegation urged the United Nations to pass a resolution that would require an immediate Israeli withdrawal from southern Lebanon, diplomats said.

== August 9 ==
IDF
- Israeli helicopters fired five shells at an administration building in Lebanon's largest Palestinian refugee camp early morning, according to the head of Fatah in Lebanon. At least one person was killed and six others injured at the Ain El-Helwe camp near Sidon, Sultan Abu Alaynen said. Israel said it was targeting the home of a Hezbollah militant. The camp houses about 50,000 registered refugees and probably at least that many who are unregistered, Abu Alaynen said. The attack left two people dead and wounded five, officials stated.
- Later, the Israeli military struck Beirut's southern suburb of Haret Hreik, once home to Hezbollah headquarters. Lebanese TV showed heavy smoke rising from the area. An Associated Press photographer at the scene said the strike hit a largely abandoned Hezbollah stronghold about a mile from where mourners were burying the dead from an earlier attack. About 400 people were in a funeral procession, the AP report said, with marchers chanting, "Death to America! Death to Israel!" after the strike.
- Meanwhile, in Gaza, an Israeli helicopter fired at a vehicle in Gaza City, killing one Palestinian militant and wounding three others, according to Palestinian security sources. In a written statement, the Israel Defense Forces said Hezbollah had been firing rockets from Khiyam into the Israeli cities of Metula, Kiryat Shmona and the Galilee panhandle.
- In the eastern Bekaa Valley five people were reported killed and two feared dead after an Israeli airraid. In other Israeli airstrikes a two-storey building in Mashghara were levelled, ending with seven people from the same family trapped under debris, according to security officials. Five bodies were later pulled out and the remaining two relatives were feared dead.
- Along the Israel-Lebanon border, Israeli troops wearing black face paint and camouflage accompanied numerous tanks into Lebanon. The Israeli military launched grenades, rocket-propelled grenades and tank shells from multiple locations as the sound of machine gun fire filled the air. In the evening the same scenario: Israel lobbed artillery rounds into southern Lebanon as troops backed by tanks and armored vehicles moved across the border.
- Hezbollah and Israeli soldiers fought overnight battles in southern Lebanon, wounding 15 Israeli soldiers. 2 Israeli soldier were also confirmed killed in fighting near Bint Jbeil during the night. 4 other Israeli soldier were killed in the Lebanese village Ayta ash Shab, being hit by a Hezbollah-rocket. In Aita el Shaab and Debel at least 15 soldiers were killed in fighting, the most Israel has lost in a single day since the fighting began, the IDF said. West of the Galilee panhandle, dozens of Israeli soldiers were injured during fighting around Bint Jbeil, Lebanon, where Israeli troops have battled militants for much of the four-week conflict, the IDF reported.
- Israeli Navy ships fired at Hizbullah targets in southern Lebanon.
- Israeli troops landed by helicopter in the village of Kharayeb, during the night, and searched houses there. Nobody was reported injured, killed or taken as prisoner.
- To this date, Israeli casualties in the conflict stand at 120 dead, including 40 civilians, and more than 700 wounded, according to the Israel Defense Forces.
- On the recommendation of Israel's Security Cabinet, ground forces are authorized to push up to the Litani River, 18 miles (29 km) inside Lebanon, in an attempt to eliminate Hezbollah threats. Senior military officials said the offensive would begin far quicker than two or three days, Associated Press reported. It is unclear if the agreement allows Israel to call up more reservists. The decision is pending final approval from Prime Minister Ehud Olmert and Defense Minister Amir Peretz, according to the prime minister's office. About 10,000 Israeli troops are on the ground in southern Lebanon, according to Israeli military analysts.
Israel
- "It is time to bring this conflict to an end," said Dan Gillerman, Israel's ambassador to the U.N. "But speeches and resolutions do not themselves end conflicts. Neither do good intentions. Conflicts are ended by actions, not by words. They are ended when those who sparked the conflict and those who seek to continue to threaten the region are confronted and overcome. "We will leave, and we will be happy to withdraw the minute the area has been stabilized, the minute the international presence will make sure that the Hezbollah has been removed and disarmed," said Dan Gillerman, Israel's ambassador to the United Nations. Gillerman also said he had problems with the idea of a U.N. force being deployed to stabilize the region, and he pointed to the U.N. Interim Force in Lebanon as an example. "This interim period has lasted 28 years," he said. "It's an interesting time frame for an interim force. During that time it has been totally incompetent, impotent, in preventing any terror attacks against Israel."
- Israel's Security Cabinet recommended that the Israeli military expand its campaign against Hezbollah in southern Lebanon. Cabinet Minister Eli Yishai told The Associated Press the proposed operation was expected to take 30 days, although a U.N. cease-fire resolution is expected before then. The plan will go into effect once it is formally approved by Israeli Prime Minister Ehud Olmert and Defense Minister Amir Peretz, according to a statement from Olmert's office. The ministers are expected to sign off quickly on the plan, but the AP, citing an Israeli Security Cabinet minister, reported Israel's offensive would not begin for two or three days to allow time for further U.N. debate on a cease-fire resolution.
- A spokeswoman for the Jewish state said the offensive was not part of an expanded campaign that Israel's Security Cabinet had approved earlier in the day. "It's a small operation that looks large from where we're looking right now, but this is not opening up any new front," spokeswoman Miri Eisen said. "It's taking care of one that has been consistently hitting Kiryat Shmona." Israel says it won't leave Lebanon until it can guarantee security on its northern border.
Hezbollah
- Hezbollah fired mortars towards the Israeli town of Metula. Some damage was reported
- Hezbollah sent totally 160 rockets across the border during the night, including 22 that landed in cities, according to Israeli police. Two people were wounded. Hezbollah forces also fired a Syrian-made 302 mm Khaibar-1 missile at the Israeli port city of Haifa.
- Anti-tank missile fire wounded five Israeli soldiers north of Bint Jbail, Lebanon, and another soldier was wounded during a ground operation in Ras El Beida, an Israeli military spokesman said.
- Hezbollah leader Hassan Nasrallah said in a televised speech he supports Lebanon's plan to send 15,000 troops into southern Lebanon. "In the past we used to oppose or not agree on deployment of the army at the borders ... because we were concerned about the army. ... We agree on deployment of the army, but do note hide our fear for it," Associated Press quoted Nasrallah as saying. Hours after the Cabinet made its decision to expand the campaign against Hezbollah, the leader appeared on Al-Manar television, threatening to turn southern Lebanon into "a graveyard" for the Israelis. "I say to the Zionists, you could come anywhere, invade, land airborne forces, enter this village or that, but I repeat, all this will cost you a high price," he said. He added that the Israeli military offensive has yet to diminish the Islamic militia's military capabilities. "We will fight until the last bullet, as long as there's a grenade, as long as there's a rocket, there will still be fighting," Nasrallah said.
Lebanon
- "We come to the Security Council asking for an immediate and comprehensive cease-fire," Tarek Mitri, Lebanon's special envoy to the U.N., told the council. "Twenty-seven days ago, we asked for an immediate cease-fire. More than 900 lives ago, we asked for an immediate cease-fire." Diplomats say the Arab proposal has piqued France's interest.
- The death toll from August 7 Israeli attack on the southern Beirut suburb of Shiyah has risen from 30 to 41, Lebanon's security forces said. The number of injured stands at 65. According to Lebanese military sources, a vicious battle broke out between Israeli troops and Hezbollah fighters in Khiyam, which Israel says is a Hezbollah stronghold. Lebanese security forces said that, to this day 827 people have died, most of them civilians, and nearly 3,200 have been wounded. Lebanon wants an "ironclad" commitment to a full Israeli withdrawal, said Arab League Secretary-General Amr Moussa. Lebanese proposal calls for an international peacekeeping force. Lebanon also is proposing to deploy 15,000 of its troops to the border, an offer the United States called "significant."
United Nations
- The UN-Security Council-proposal calls for Hezbollah to move out of the south and into positions north of the Litani River, but it makes no mention of disarmament.
- At the United Nations, the timetable for an Israeli withdrawal from Lebanon continued to be a sticking point in negotiations to end the fighting. Diplomats said U.N. Security Council members need to get "back on the same page" by an early enough time to see a vote on a cease-fire resolution the following day. At issue was Lebanon's proposal to send 15,000 troops into southern Lebanon—provided all of Israel's troops withdraw back into Israel—and to move a U.N. force into the disputed Shebaa Farms region, a sliver of land occupied by Israel that Lebanon claims but the United Nations has ruled belongs to Syria. A diplomatic source familiar with the negotiations said that the French are pushing new language in the resolution taking the Arab concerns into account—including specific text on the Shebaa Farms region. The source said the French are trying to redraft many parts of the resolution—a move that makes U.S. officials nervous.
- According to U.N. observers, a vicious battle broke out between Israeli troops and Hezbollah fighters in Khiyam, which Israel says is a Hezbollah stronghold.
Arab League
- Arab League chief Amr Moussa said that talks from the evening of August 8, which came after the Arab delegation presented its views at a Security Council session, "were promising." "There are new developments and points that the Arab side wishes to insert," he said. " ... on August 9 we will resume our consultations. We hope that by August 10 all sides will know at least the skeleton of what kind of a new draft will be." The Arab League wants an "ironclad" commitment to a full Israeli withdrawal.
United States
- A Bush administration official keeping track of the U.N. developments said the White House is "sympathetic" to the concerns raised by an Arab delegation. But the official said, "We want a final product that has a reasonable chance of success." The United States is concerned the Lebanese army will be not able or willing to stop the resupply of Hezbollah and is not convinced that a bolstered U.N. peacekeeping force could do the job either. The official added that Israel has "even stronger" views. Nonetheless the U.S.-backed draft resolution calls for an international peacekeeping force.
- Meanwhile, diplomats still hoped for a vote on August 10 on the U.N. resolution aimed at ending the conflict, but an Arab-backed proposal that calls for a full Israeli withdrawal threatened to tip "a very delicate balance" and set the process back again, a Bush administration official said.
- As fighting raged in the Middle East, senior White House officials said it did not appear likely that a vote would come August 10 on a U.N. resolution to end the conflict. The United States, an Israeli ally and chief supplier of the Jewish state's weapons, warned both sides against enlarging the conflict. "The escalation is something that we do not want to see," White House spokesman Tony Snow said. "But also, you have to have a resolution that addresses the root cause of Hezbollah, has a practical solution to making sure that the Lebanese government will be able to have military and political control of the south.".
- The United States and France, which offered a draft resolution on August 5, were trying to agree on certain segments of a revised draft, officials said. One point of contention is a Lebanese proposal, backed by the Arab League, that calls for Israel's immediate withdrawal from Lebanon. But the U.S.-French resolution does not call for Israel's withdrawal. There is also some disagreement on the timing of a deployment of Lebanese and U.N. troops to the region. The United States says it is pushing for "flexibility" so Israel can monitor the deployment before pulling out, a position the Israelis favor. "Everybody wants to see that the deployment of 15,000 Lebanese troops to the border used to transform the situation in the region, which means fundamentally that we don't want Hezbollah to reinfiltrate the southern part of Lebanon," said U.S. Ambassador to the United Nations John Bolton.
France
- The United States and France, which offered a draft resolution on August 5, were trying to agree on certain segments of a revised draft, officials said. One point of contention is a Lebanese proposal, backed by the Arab League, that calls for Israel's immediate withdrawal from Lebanon. But the U.S.-French resolution does not call for Israel's withdrawal. There is also some disagreement on the timing of a deployment of Lebanese and U.N. troops to the region.
