= Lait =

Lait may refer to:

- Jack Lait (1883–1954), American journalist
- Jacqui Lait (born 1947), British Conservative politician
- Liban Lait, a Lebanese dairy farm
