= Qana massacre (disambiguation) =

Qana Massacre may refer to:

- Qana massacre, also known as the First Qana massacre, an Israeli airstrike on a UN compound near Qana, Lebanon
- 2006 Qana airstrike, also known as the Second Qana massacre, an attack in July 2006 on a civilian building near Qana, Lebanon
