= 2006 Shiyyah airstrike =

Airstrike in Lebanon

- Part of the 2006 Lebanon War
- Type: Airstrike
- Location: Shiyyah, Lebanon; 33°53′13″N 35°30′47″E
- Target: Hezbollah
- Date: August 7, 2006; 8:00 p.m. EET (UTC+02:00)
- Executed by: Israeli Air Force
- Casualties: 61 killed 40 injured
- Location of Shiyyah within Lebanon

The 2006 Shiyyah airstrike was an attack by the Israel Air Force (IAF) on the Shiyyah suburb in the Lebanese capital of Beirut on August 7, 2006, during the 2006 Lebanon War. Two missiles fired from an IDF bomber destroyed three apartment buildings in the suburb. Contemporary news accounts stated that the death toll from the airstrikes rose as recovery efforts continued, with 50 corpses recovered at the time of reportage and 61 anticipated.

== Timeline of events ==
The nearby area of Haret Hreik, described as "Hizbollah's stronghold", had been targeted over a four-week period prior to the attack on Shiyyah, which had not been targeted by the IAF earlier. Around 8 pm local time, an IAF missile hit a five-storey residential apartment block in Hijaj Street, just outside central Beirut, killing a number of civilians and wounding other residents.

The area is a densely populated residential district and predominantly Shi'a. Businesses in Hijaj Street include a supermarket, a hairdressing salon, a fishmonger, a greengrocer's and a mobile phone shop, with an internet cafe in the basement of the apartment block. Residents stated that there was no Hezbollah activity in the area. Many of the people killed and wounded were refugees from previous violence in South Lebanon.
Fifteen of the dead were from the Remaiti family which owned a residential building in Asaad al-Assad street. According to survivors, before the missiles exploded, an Israeli drone flew over the Shiyyah district. At the same time, it is reported that a young boy drove down Assaad al-Assad street on a motorcycle and fired into the sky with a rifle opposite the Remaiti home. Not long afterwards, the building was hit by two missiles.

=== Medical and humanitarian response ===
Residents of Shiyyah, along with Lebanese Civil Defense and Red Cross workers, worked at trying to remove rubble after the attack before the rest of the building collapsed.

Immediately following the attack some of the wounded were taken to Hayat Hospital, Beirut.

== Casualties ==
Initial reports put the figure at five dead. Reports following this had the figures at 15 to 17 residents killed with 40 wounded. Lebanese police said on August 8 that the confirmed figure of 30 dead could rise as recovery attempts continued. By August 9 the figure of dead was placed at 41 with the recovery efforts continuing.

By August 11 the Lebanese Health Minister Mohamad Khalifeh, said 50 bodies had been recovered and 61 were expected to be recovered, as 11 civilians that were known to be in the building were still unaccounted. Minister Khalifeh said: "There is no way to know for certain how many were killed. There were many displaced people in the building who are still unaccounted for."

== See also ==
- Al-Qaa airstrike
- 2006 Qana airstrike
- 2006 Ghaziyeh airstrikes
- 2006 Marjayoun convoy
