= Attack on Marjayoun convoy =

Marjayoun convoy attack
- Part of the 2006 Lebanon War
- Type: Airstrike
- Location: Marjayoun, Beqaa Valley, northeast of Hasbaya
- Date: August 11, 2006
- Executed by: Israel Air Force
- Casualties: 7 killed 36 injured

On August 11, 2006, the Israeli military attacked a convoy of cars fleeing Marjayoun. The attacked killed 7 people and injured another 36; the convoy consisted of approximately 759 vehicles containing Lebanese police, army, civilians, and one Associated Press journalist. It was attacked by the Israeli Air Force (IAF), reportedly by an unmanned aircraft, as it travelled away from the area of Marjayoun. Marjayoun is a predominantly Christian town about 8 km (5.0 mi) from the border with Israel.

The convoy was reportedly attacked with eight to nine IAF bombs as it travelled 30 km (19 mi) northeast of Hasbaya en route to Kefraya in the south of the Bekaa valley. The bombing resulted in the deaths of at least seven people, wounding of at least 36, and the destruction of a number of vehicles. Israel later said the attack was a "mistake". Israel explained that it suspected Hezbollah of smuggling weapons south, although Al-Jazeera pointed out the convoy was actually headed north. The attacks took place during the 2006 Lebanon War.

== Timeline of events ==
The convoy had set out on August 11 after the Israeli Army entered the Lebanese army base in Marjayoun on August 10. The IDF took over the base and an evacuation of the Lebanese troops was arranged via UNIFIL. In their press release for August 12, UNIFIL described the sequence of events:

"At the request of the Lebanese government, UNIFIL was in contact with the IDF to facilitate the withdrawal of the Lebanese Joint Security Forces (JSF) from Marjayoun yesterday. Israeli forces informed UNIFIL that they agree to such a request. Yesterday afternoon, the JSF convoy (87 vehicles with around 350 troops, all ranks), which was joined by the Internal Security Forces (10 vehicles with around 40 troops) and around 100 civilian vehicles, left the town of Marjayoun. UNIFIL informed the IDF about the convoy and its planned route to Beirut through the west Beka’a valley. The convoy followed 2 UNIFIL APCs out of the town to Ibil as Saqi. It was reported that 365 additional civilian vehicles from Marjayoun joined the convoy in the area of Ibil as Saqi."

"Subsequently, the convoy departed from UNIFIL area of operations and continued north. At around 22.00 hours, the Lebanese authorities informed UNIFIL that the convoy came under Israeli air strikes in the general area of Kefraya in the west Beka’a, and a number of people were killed and wounded. UNIFIL conveyed this information to the IDF and asked them to immediately cease attacks on the convoy. At the request of the Lebanese authorities today, UNIFIL requested the IDF to give security clearance for the convoy to proceed towards Beirut."

The convoy was escorted by two UNIFIL vehicles as far as the town of Hasbaya, 13 km (8.1 mi) from Marjayoun. The convoy then continued and was reportedly attacked by IDF drones 30 km (19 mi) northeast of Hasbaya. The attack was conducted with nine bombs, Lebanese authorities said.

=== Timeline according to the IDF ===
Immediately after the attack, the IDF reportedly said they were "investigating the incident". A statement from the IDF was released on 12 August and said that after receiving a request for the convoy to depart, the IDF had denied it. The statement also said that before the attack the IDF had "identified suspicious movement along a route forbidden for travel which had been used by Hizbullah to transport rockets and other weaponry." The IDF also stated that they suspected that the movement represented "Hizbullah terrorists transporting weaponry." The IDF also said that they were told by UNIFIL after the attacks that the convoy was civilian.

The IDF also pointed out that a leaflet drop and announcement had been issued on 7 August, prohibiting the movement of any type of vehicle in all areas south of the Litani River. The limitation took effect at 22:00 on August 7, 2006, and was in force when the attack took place. The attack however occurred north of the Litani close to Kefraya.

Israel explained that it suspected Hezbollah of using the convoy to smuggle weapons south, although Al-Jazeera pointed out the convoy was actually headed north.

=== Medical and humanitarian response ===
An AP photographer with the convoy said that there was an attack on Red Cross and civil defense vehicles coming to the convoy's aid, but that it was unknown if anyone was hurt. The Red Cross also said six civilians died, 32 were wounded, and that a Lebanese Red Cross first-aid volunteer, Mikhael Jbayleh, was also killed at the scene as he tended to the wounded.

== Reactions ==
UN spokesman Milos Strugar said of the attack: "UNIFIL left the convoy at that place [Hasbaya], the Israeli forces had been told in advance of the convoy's passage, and had given it the green light".

Head of the Lebanese Red Cross's rescue teams, George Kettaneh, said the convoy had been "deliberately targeted" by the IDF.

Lebanese President Émile Lahoud condemned the IDF attack, saying: "the Israeli bombardment of the convoy [took place] despite an agreement negotiated by UNIFIL guaranteeing its safety".

== See also ==
- 2006 Qana airstrike
- 2006 Qaa airstrike
- 2006 al-Qaa airstrike
- 2006 Shiyyah airstrike
- 2006 Ghaziyeh airstrikes
- List of extrajudicial killings and political violence in Lebanon
