= 2006 Al-Qaa airstrike =

- Part of the 2006 Lebanon War
- Type: Airstrike
- Location: Qaa, Lebanon; 34°20′37″N 36°28′32″E
- Date: 4 August 2006
- Executed by: Israel Air Force
- Casualties: 33 killed 20 injured
- Location of Qaa within Lebanon

The 2006 Al-Qaa airstrike was an attack by the Israel Air Force (IAF) on a building in the area of al-Qaa around 10 kilometers (six miles) from Hermel in the Bekaa Valley, Lebanon on 4 August 2006. The attack took place during the 2006 Lebanon War. Thirty-three farm workers, mostly Syrian and Lebanese Kurds, were killed during the airstrike.

== Timeline of events ==
=== Timeline according to the workers ===
According to workers the timeline was:

The workers were loading farm produce, primarily peaches and plums, from a walk-in cooler into a refrigerated truck. The produce was for export over the border. The refrigerated container was situated beyond the building which was attacked and close to Lebanese customs office in an area leading to the border with Syria. This building was just on the outskirts of the village where the Lebanese company's farm is located. Mohammad Rashed, a farmworker and one of the wounded said:

"I was picking peaches when three bombs hit. Others were having lunch and they were torn to pieces,"

Preliminary reports said that three IAF missiles hit the farm and that 23-27 civilians had been killed in the attack. The toll was revealed within hours to be thirty three dead and twenty wounded.

=== Timeline according to the IAF ===
According to an IAF spokesman, Capt. Jacob Dallal, who issued a statement on the attack:

"The air force spotted a truck that was suspected to have been loaded with weapons cross from Syria into Lebanon on a route that is routinely used to transport weapons. The truck entered into a building and remained inside for an hour, then left and returned to Syria."

The IAF said that once the truck had left the area the building was attacked.

=== Medical and humanitarian response ===
After the strike, a bulldozer was brought to the scene to try to clear away rubble and to aid the search for survivors.

The dead and wounded were taken to nearby Syria after the raid, and were treated at al-Qusair National Hospital on the Lebanese-Syrian border and at the National Hospital in the Syrian city of Homs.

According to early reports from the official Syrian news agency (SANA), the Syrian dead included eighteen men, two elderly women and three young girls. Later reports put the total of Syrian dead at twenty three including eighteen men, five women, and three girls, with the remaining 10 fatalities being Lebanese nationals. Ten Syrian workers were also wounded in the IAF attack.

== Reactions ==
=== Syria ===
There was widespread public anger at the attack in Syria. Syria's Information Minister, Dr. Muhsen Bilal, gave his reaction to the bombing in a statement describing the attack as:"..an Israeli racial and fascist act that has been carried out by US-made weapons and rockets." He went on to comment: "The Israeli aggression hasn't yet achieved any winnings but slaying defenseless children, women and old aged; this unjustified act contradicts the moral and religious principles and norms,"

== See also ==
- 1996 shelling of Qana
- 2006 Qana airstrike
- 2006 Chyah airstrike
- 2006 Ghaziyeh airstrikes
- 2006 Marjayoun convoy
