= Haret Hreik =

Suburb of Beirut, Lebanon

Coordinates: 33°51′N 35°31′E

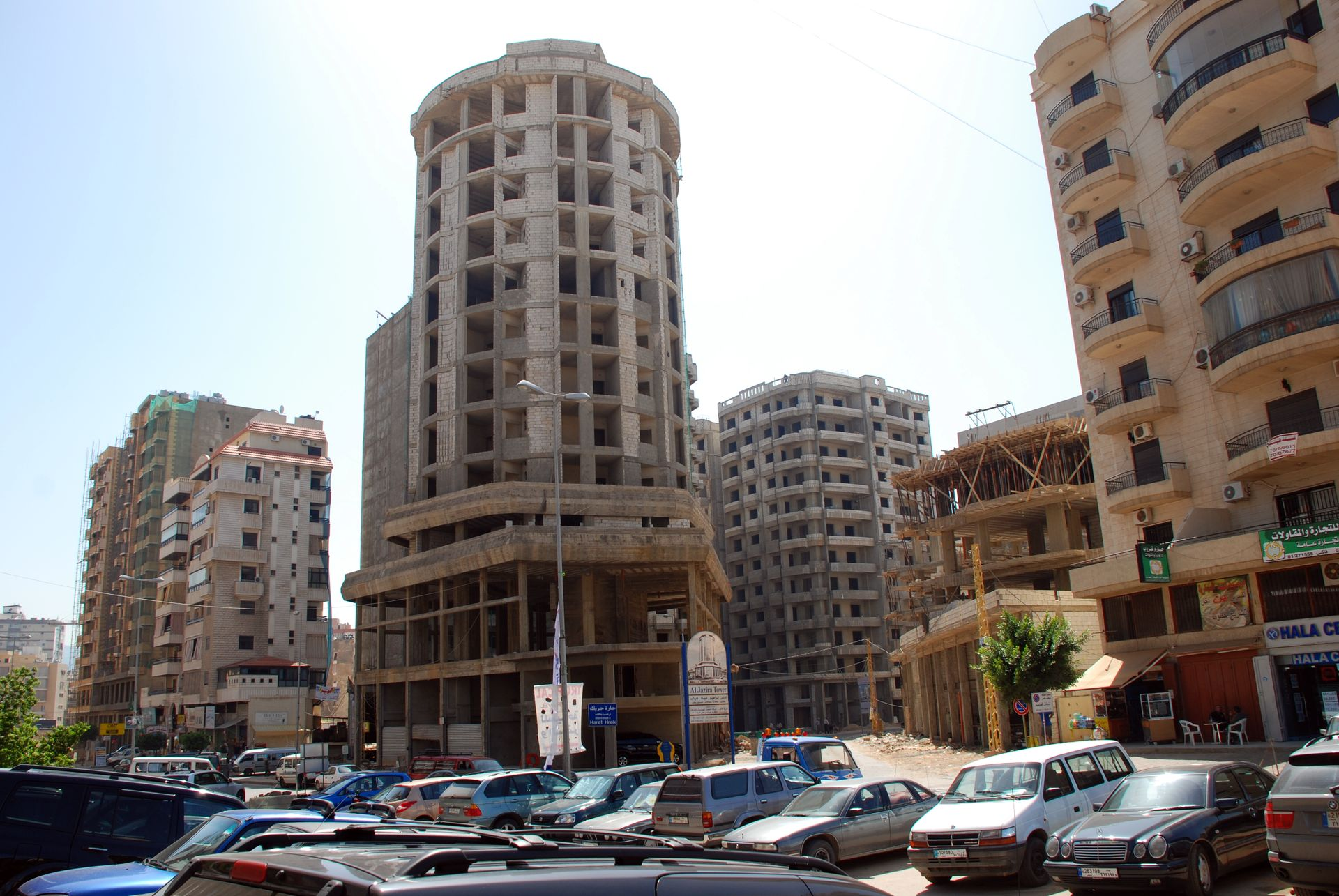
Haret Hreik in 2009

Haret Hreik (Arabic: حارة حريك, romanized: Ḥārat Ḥrayk) is a mixed Shia and Maronite Christian municipality, in the Dahieh suburbs, south of Beirut, Lebanon. It is part of the Baabda District. Once an agricultural and Christian village, Haret Hreik lost its rural and Christian identity due to the wave of Shia Muslim refugees from Southern Lebanon who settled in the town and made it another urban neighborhood of Dahieh.

Haret Hreik is located northeast of the Beirut–Rafic Hariri International Airport and north of the towns of Laylake and Bourj el-Barajneh, west of Hadath and south of Chyah. The district is the de-facto epicenter of the Shia group Hezbollah. The district was heavily damaged in the July 2006 Hezbollah War by the Israeli airforce that destroyed 640 kilometres (400 miles) of roads, 73 bridges, and 31 other targets such as sea ports, water and sewage treatment plants, electrical facilities, 25 fuel stations, 900 commercial structures, up to 350 schools and two hospitals, and 130,000 residences.

On 3 September 1985, during the War of the Camps, gunmen from the Amal militia killed thirteen Palestinian civilians in Haret Hreik.

In July 2024, Israeli military announced that they had targeted and killed senior Hezbollah commander Fuad Shukr in an airstrike launched by Israeli fighter jets on a building in the southern suburb of Beirut.

== 2006 Lebanon War ==
The area was largely destroyed during the 2006 Lebanon War. It was estimated that close to 200 buildings were destroyed in the town during the first week of Israel's attack on Lebanon in 2006, with a total of more than 700 structures destroyed or damaged by the end of the war and thousands of civilians injured or dead. The town has since undergone significant reconstruction, replacing destroyed and damaged buildings.

== Demographics ==
In 2014, Muslims made up 51.52% and Christians made up 48.19% of registered voters in Haret Hreik all Of them live in other areas. 43.47% of the voters were Shiite Muslims, 40.96% were Maronite Catholics, 8.03% were Sunni Muslims.

== Culture and education ==
Haret Hreik houses Umam Documentation & Research, an organization that archives material related to Lebanon's history. Umam also runs The Hangar, a contemporary arts space featuring events and exhibitions.

The town also hosts three main libraries. In addition, two hospitals operate in the area (Sahel General Hospital and Bahman hospital), providing services to residents. The area hosts cultural activities, including shopping carnivals, art contests and talks.

== Sport ==
Shabab Al Sahel FC, a football club playing in the Lebanese Premier League, is based in Haret Hreik.

== Notable people ==
- Michel Aoun (born 1933), former President of Lebanon
- Mohammad Hussein Fadlallah (1935–2010), spiritual mentor of Hezbollah
- Lokman Slim (1962–2021), publisher
- Samira Awad (born 2000), footballer
- Hasan Srour (born 2001), footballer

== See also ==
- 2006 Lebanon War
- Targeting of civilian areas in the 2006 Israel-Lebanon conflict
