= 2006 Ghaziyeh airstrikes =

- Part of the 2006 Lebanon War
- Type: Airstrike
- Location: Ghaziyeh, Lebanon; 33°31′7.19″N 35°20′55.55″E
- Date: 7–8 August 2006
- Executed by: Israeli Air Force
- Casualties: 26-30 killed 33+ injured
- Location of Ghaziyeh within Lebanon

The 2006 Ghaziyeh airstrikes also referred to as the 2006 Ghaziyeh massacre were two sequential attacks by the Israel Air Force (IAF) on the city of Ghaziyeh in Lebanon on August 7, and August 8, 2006. The attacks took place during the 2006 Lebanon War. In the first attack on August 7, the IAF bombed a building killing 16 people. In the second attack on August 8, the IAF fired five missiles into three buildings killing a total of 8 to 14 civilians and wounding 33. A total of 26 to 30 civilians died in the attacks.

== Timeline of events ==
=== First IAF Attack ===
On 7 August the IAF targeted a building in Ghaziyeh, killing 16 and collapsing the building.

=== Second IAF Attacks ===
On 8 August the IAF targeted a building and launched three missiles at it. An IDF spokesman claimed the building housed a Hezbollah member and that was why it was targeted. One person was killed and five were wounded in this attack. Witnesses told an AP reporter that one of the destroyed houses belonged to Sheik Mustafa Khalifeh, a cleric linked to Hezbollah, but it was unclear if he was among the casualties.

The first bombing run happened as the funerals for the fifteen victims of the attack on the previous day were taking place. The mourners were reportedly 500 metres away from the blast, which then sent around 1,500 mourners running through the streets in panic. Eight civilians were killed and 33 wounded in the second IAF attack, Lebanon's security forces said.

Thirty minutes after this airstrike, the IAF, according to the mayor, Mohammed Ghaddar, staged four more bombing runs, destroying two buildings. Twelve people were killed in these bombings, with eighteen wounded according to a total from the three area hospitals.

=== Area ===
Ghaziyeh is just south of Sidon, around 40 km from Beirut. The city had been housing many refugees who had moved north to avoid fighting near the Israeli border and its population is reported to have swollen to 23,000. The IDF has said that leaflets warning residents to move out of the city were dropped prior to the second attack.

Israeli bombers hit targets in Beirut, Tyre, Qassmieh, Ghaziyeh, Ghassaniyeh, Nabatiyeh, Naqoura and Ras al-Biyada on August 7.

=== Medical and humanitarian response ===
In the first attack, Lebanese rescue workers dug with their hands and used a bulldozer to look for survivors of the attack with initial reports putting the death toll at eighteen.

== See also ==
- 2006 Qana airstrike
- 2006 al-Qaa airstrike
- 2006 Shiyyah airstrike
- 2006 Marjayoun convoy
