= Liban Lait =

Lebanese dairy farm

Liban Lait is the name of the largest dairy farm in Lebanon, founded in 1997.

Liban Lait produces and distributes dairy products in Lebanon. It has a franchise agreement with Candia, the leading producers of UHT milk in France, allowing it to distribute and manufacture products under the Candia brand name.

Liban Lait spreads over an area of 504,000 square metres in the Bekaa Valley. Facilities include a farm and a fully automated processing plant.

Liban Lait’s dairy factory in Baalbek was bombed by the Israeli airforce during the 2006 offensive against Hizbollah. Three people were killed, two of them Belgium technicians. Liban Lait has the contract to supply the United Nations Interim Force in Lebanon (UNIFIL) with milk ; previously, this contract had been held by an Israeli firm.
