= 2006 Qana airstrike =

Israeli airstrike in Lebanon

- Part of the 2006 Lebanon War
- Lebanese Red Cross and Civil Defense workers carrying a child's body
- Type: Airstrike, massacre
- Location: Qana, South Governorate, Lebanon; 33°12′52″N 35°17′55″E
- Date: July 30, 2006; 1:00 a.m. EET (UTC+02:00)
- Executed by: Israeli Air Force
- Casualties: 28 killed ~8 injured
- Location of Qana within Lebanon

The 2006 Qana airstrike (also referred to as the 2006 Qana massacre or the second Qana massacre) was an airstrike carried out by the Israeli Air Force (IAF) on a three-story building in the small community of al-Khuraybah near the South Lebanese village of Qana on July 30, 2006, during the 2006 Lebanon War. The strike killed 28 civilians, 16 of whom were children. Israel halted airstrikes for 48 hours following the attack, amid increasing calls for a ceasefire in the conflict between Israel and Lebanon's Hezbollah guerrillas.

Initial media reports stated that more than 50 people, including 37 children, had been killed, although later reports revised this to a lower figure of 28, including 16 children, with 13 people reported missing. Residents dug through the rubble with their hands, searching for survivors as bodies were removed. Video broadcast by Arab TV showed the bloodied bodies of women and children who appeared to be wearing nightclothes.

The Israel Defence Forces (IDF), although it admitted striking the building, initially denied that the explosion that caused the mass deaths were the result of their attack. This was contested by Qana's residents, who said the building collapsed due to the Israeli bombing. According to the IDF, the bombing was an attempt to stop Katyusha rockets supposedly being fired by Hezbollah into northern Israel from the village over a two-week period and said residents were warned to leave. According to Human Rights Watch, international observers and journalists said there was no evidence the building served any military purpose. Lebanese Prime Minister Fouad Siniora accused Israel of war crimes and asked, "Why, we wonder, did they choose Qana yet again?", in reference to an artillery shelling carried out by Israeli forces that killed over 100 civilians at a UN compound 10 years before. Kofi Annan urged the United Nations Security Council to condemn the attack.

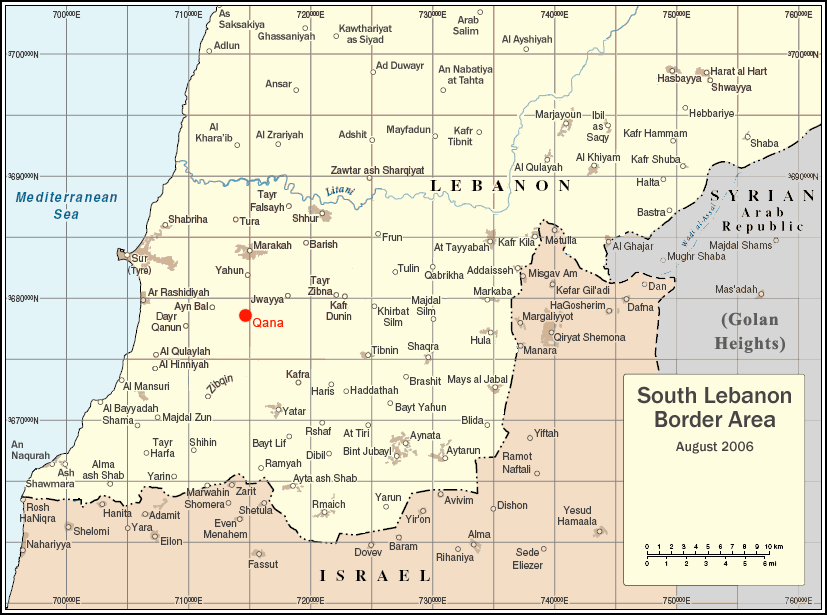
Map of South Lebanon showing location of Qana

== Attack; medical and humanitarian response ==
The airstrike was carried out using two bombs, at least one of which was precision guided, which were dropped in the hour following 1 a.m. on July 30, The second bomb was dropped five to fifteen minutes after the first. The aerial attack killed members of the Shalhoub and Hashem families who had used an underground garage below a three-story apartment building as a shelter during the bombing. Initial news reports state that the families were asleep when the two bombs were dropped on their building. While Israel had directed residents of South Lebanon to flee the conflict, roads out of the area were also subject to Israeli bombardment. One of the eight survivors of the blast said that attacks on the roads out of Qana discouraged the two families from leaving. Anthony Shadid, reporting for The Washington Post, described the scene he saw that day: "Most of the dead had choked on flying dirt and other debris. Their bodies, intact, preserved their final gestures: a raised arm called for help, an old man pulled on pants. Twelve-year-old Hussein Hashem lay curled in the fetal position, his mouth seeming to have vomited earth. Mohammed Chalhoub sat on the ground, his right hand broken. Khadja, his wife and Hasna, his mother, were dead, as were his daughters, Hawra and Zahra, aged twelve and two. As were his sons, Ali, ten; Yahya, nine; and Assem, seven."

The Christian Science Monitor reported that further airstrikes and artillery attacks, which destroyed several houses in Qana, delayed the rescue response. Sami Yazbuk, the head of the Red Cross in Tyre, told The Guardian that the first call about the bombing was received at 7 a.m. He said that previous shelling on the road to Qana had delayed the arrival of Red Cross personnel.

== Casualties ==
According to Lebanese Red Cross and Tyre hospital records, 28 people were recorded killed in the attack on Qana. At least eight people in the homes survived the attack, some of whom were wounded. The dead ranged in age from nine months to 75 years.

The victims were unable to be buried until August due to the continued Israeli attacks in southern Lebanon. A funeral in Qana took place for 30 people on August 18, with all 27 victims of the airstrike buried. Twenty-six of the victims had their coffins draped with the Lebanese flag, while one was draped in a Hezbollah flag to signify his being a Hezbollah sympathizer. Three Hezbollah fighters from Qana who were killed in fighting unrelated to the airstrike outside of Qana were also buried that day, two alongside the airstrike victims and one elsewhere in the city, and their coffins were also covered in the Hezbollah flag.

== Reactions ==
Responding to the incident, Lebanese Prime Minister Fouad Siniora denounced "Israeli war criminals" and canceled talks with US Secretary of State Condoleezza Rice. In a television address to the country, he said, "There is no place on this sad morning for any discussion other than an immediate and unconditional cease-fire as well as an international investigation into the Israeli massacres." After the announcement, Rice canceled her planned visit to Beirut. Prime Minister Siniora appealed to the U.N. Security Council for an emergency session, which held consultations on July 30, 2006. In a statement, the Security Council expressed the world body's "extreme shock and distress" at the Qana bombing and offered its condolences for the deaths. The airstrike on Qana threatened to derail work toward a resolution in the 19-day conflict between Israel and Lebanon-based Hezbollah guerrillas. In Beirut, outrage over the attack sparked violent protest at a U.N. office, with protesters using rocks, boards and poles to break into the building. In Gaza, Palestinian security forces had to eject about 2,000 demonstrators who had stormed the U.N. compound there in protest against the Qana attack.

In Israel, thousands joined in protests on July 30, most of them in the Arab village of Umm al-Fahm, but also including hundreds of Gush Shalom and Meretz supporters in separate demonstrations in Tel Aviv, and smaller numbers in Haifa and the Galilee. The Association for Civil Rights in Israel called for state commission of inquiry into "a blatant violation of two basic principles of humanitarian law and international criminal law."

=== International reaction ===
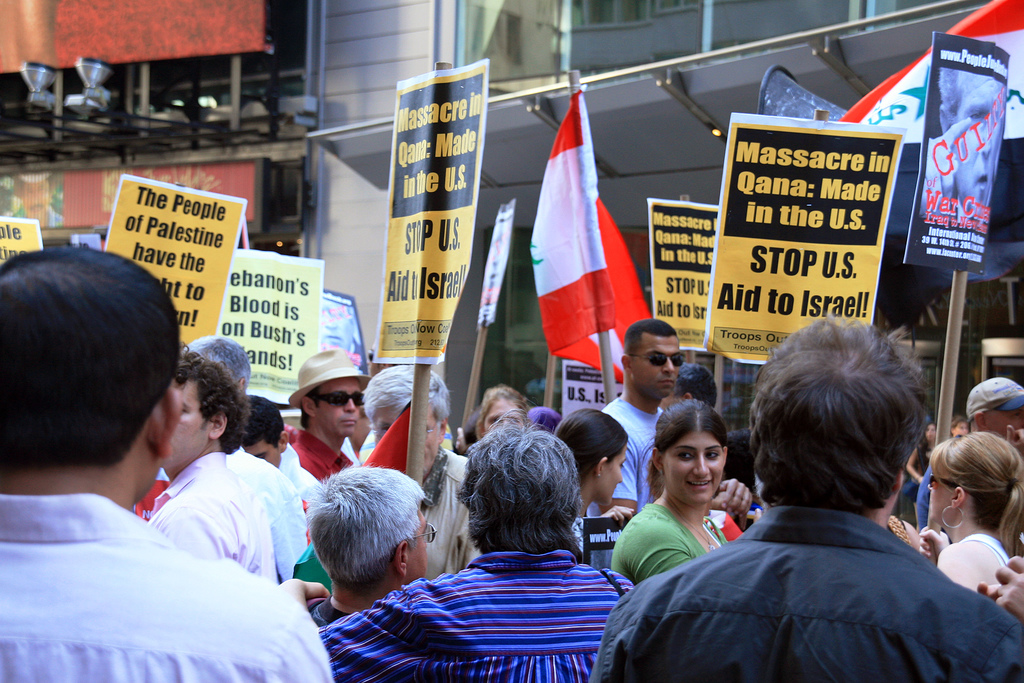
Protest in Times Square, New York City, August 3, 2006.

The Qana airstrike was condemned by several countries and non-governmental organizations, as well as resulting in public demonstrations in a number of countries in the Middle East and elsewhere. On July 31, in response to global criticism, Israel agreed to suspend air strikes over southern Lebanon for up to 48 hours, which would allow for further civilian evacuations from the area, as well as investigation of the incident but said it would not refrain from responding to imminent threats. During that time, Hezbollah also halted cross-border rocket fire into Israel.

The International Committee of the Red Cross said in a July 30 statement on the IDF's attack on Qana: "Issuing advance warning to the civilian population of impending attacks in no way relieves a warring party of its obligations under the rules and principles of international humanitarian law." It also called for "a distinction to be drawn at all times between civilians and civilian objects on the one hand, and military objectives on the other. All necessary precautions must be taken to spare civilian life and objects and to ensure that the wounded have access to medical facilities." Red Cross worker Sami Yazbak, who was helping to pull bodies from the building, said that "many of the children who were sleeping inside were handicapped." Human Rights Watch also warned that the "consistent failure to distinguish combatants and civilians is a war crime." In an interview with Israeli newspaper Yediot Aharonot, an IDF general confirmed that throughout the 2006 Lebanon war Israel pursued a strategy of not differentiating between civilians and combatants in order to keep the casualty toll on the Israeli side low.

=== Journalist commentary ===
Some commentators have pointed out similarities to the 1996 shelling of Qana, in which over 100 civilians were killed by Israeli anti-personnel shells on a UN compound. In the first case, Israel alleged that it fired without knowing the compound harbored civilians. The allegation was put into question after evidence came out that, at the time of the strike, Israel was spying on the compound with two helicopters and a drone. Both incidents resulted in increased pressure on Israel to declare a cease-fire. Qana's strategic location at the confluence of five major roadways and on the northern edge of Hezbollah-controlled southern Lebanon may have contributed as to its repeatedly being caught in the crossfire.

=== Position of Israel ===
Israeli Defense Force spokesmen initially reported that the building had collapsed several hours after Israeli bombing. According to the IAF Chief of Staff, Brigadier-General Amir Eshel, the building was attacked a little after midnight. He also alleged that he did not know when the building collapsed, but: "according to foreign press reports, and this is one of the reports we are relying on, the house collapsed at 8 A.M. We do not have testimony regarding the time of the collapse. If the house collapsed at 12 A.M., it is difficult for me to believe that they waited eight hours to evacuate it." In addition, it was reported that senior IAF officers had said that the collapse could have been caused by an unexploded missile or by a Hezbollah-planted explosive device. The IDF's excuses were immediately denounced by Qana's residents and witnesses of the strike, who said the Israeli shelling was responsible for the collapse. An elderly man who survived the strike said a Hezbollah device could not be the cause of the explosion, since Israeli destruction of local infrastructure made it impossible that weaponries be moved towards the building.

IDF still shot identification of a rocket being launched from near Qana houses

Screen captures from an IDF video showing rockets being launched from near Qana houses

Israeli Chief of Staff Dan Halutz expressed regret over the incident and apologized for the pain the Lebanese people had endured, while also blaming the Hezbollah for using the villagers as "human shields", a tactic the IDF accused Hezbollah militants of using throughout the war.

In its report on civilian casualties during the war, however, independent researchers at Human Rights Watch concluded that there was no evidence that Hezbollah fired at Israel from populated areas. The Christian Science Monitor likewise found Hezbollah fighters launched their rockets at Israel from unpopulated areas that they declared no-go zones to Lebanese civilians. Witnesses of the strike denied Hezbollah fighters were present near the compound at the time Israel shelled it.

But Israel's ambassador to the United Nations Dan Gillerman initially accused Hezbollah of being responsible for the civilian deaths: "Israel has [beseeched] and asked repeatedly for the residents of Qana to leave. I would not be surprised if the Hezbollah made them stay." According to Human Rights Watch, though many civilians in South Lebanon refused to abandon their homes and act on the IDF's warnings, many others were unable to flee due to crumbled infrastructure. Israel singled out much of Lebanese civilian infrastructure for destruction throughout the war and at the end of the conflict the damage was estimated to top 2.5 billion dollars.

"Clearly, we did not know the civilians were in the way," said IDF spokesman Jacob Dalal, who added that Israel was exercising its right to defend itself with its campaign of airstrikes. Israel reserved the right to take action against targets preparing attacks against it during the 48-hour period, an Israeli official said. Other officials called the attack a tragic mistake. Israel also arranged with U.N. officials to allow safe passage for 24 hours so residents of southern Lebanon can flee the region. The official confirmed an earlier announcement by U.S. State Department spokesman Adam Ereli, who said the bombing halt should "significantly speed and improve the flow of humanitarian aid."

A high-ranking IAF officer said on July 31 that the IDF had targeted the village since July 28, when it struck 10 targets there, and that the building that was hit on July 30 was chosen as a target after Israeli intelligence indicated that Hezbollah soldiers along with Katyusha rockets and launchers were hidden inside. The IDF has claimed that the airstrike was in response to over 150 Katyusha rockets fired from the area of the village into Israel in a two-week period. The IDF also said that they believed the building to be empty. "We warned the residents that we would be attacking there," a high-ranking IDF officer said, "We work under the belief that the villages are empty and that whoever is there is affiliated with Hezbollah." Amnesty accused Israel of assuming without grounds that its alleged warnings to civilians were acted upon, and firing indiscriminately at civilians remaining based on that assumption.

The IDF did not release footage of the airstrike itself, but did release a video it said was taken some time before the incident showing Katyusha rockets being fired southwest of Qana. The video also showed rocket launchers being hidden in buildings but the buildings were not identified as being in Qana as was reported. On August 6, the BBC News reported that in a second attack in Qana, the IDF destroyed the Hezbollah rocket launchers in the village used against targets in Haifa, Israel.

==== Timeline of events according to IDF ====
Accounts have differed regarding the timing of events at Qana. According to reports of the incident:

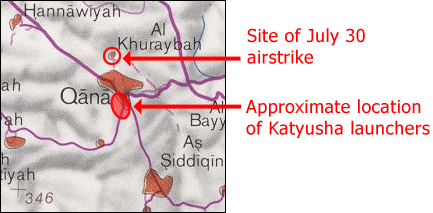

- In the two weeks prior to the bombing, Hezbollah fired a number of Katyusha rockets from an area between Qana and the nearby village of Al Ṣiddiqin.
- The Israeli Defence Forces identified a building in the hamlet of Al Khuraybah just north of Qana as a Hezbollah hideout/weapons store.
- Around 1:15 A.M on July 30, 2006, the Israel Air Force bombed the building in al-Khuraybah.
- At least part of the building collapsed instantly, killing at least several young children who were sheltering inside.
- Following the initial strike, some of the people in the building exited in an attempt to survey the damage.
- Within ten minutes, a second IAF airstrike hit the building, causing the walls to collapse on the residents who did not vacate, killing them in the process.

==== Allegations of a hoax and of staging ====
Following the attack, commentary in Israeli newspapers like Arutz Sheva asserted that the loss of life reported during the Qana attack was brought about by Hezbollah fighters themselves, in order to generate anti-Israel sympathy. On August 2, the Israel Defense Forces stated they were "aware of the rumors", although the allegations did not form part of their later statement on the bombing. On Fox News, there were claims that some widely circulated photographs of the dead in Qana were staged.

== Investigations into the airstrike ==
On August 1, the Israeli newspaper, Haaretz, reported:

"As the Israel Air Force continues to investigate the air strike [at Qana], questions have been raised over military accounts of the incident. It now appears that the military had no information on rockets launched from the site of the building, or the presence of Hezbollah men at the time. The Israel Defense Forces had said after the deadly air-strike that many rockets had been launched from Qana. However, it changed its version on Monday. The site was included in an IAF plan to strike at several buildings in proximity to a previous launching site. Similar strikes were carried out in the past. However, there were no rocket launches from Qana on the day of the strike."

=== Bomb details ===
A piece of bomb fuselage bearing the markings (in English) "FOR USE ON MK-84 GUIDED BOMB BSU-37/B (ASSY) 96214-700922-6" was unearthed by Lebanese Civil Defense officials at the scene and verified by international media.

=== Human Rights Watch ===
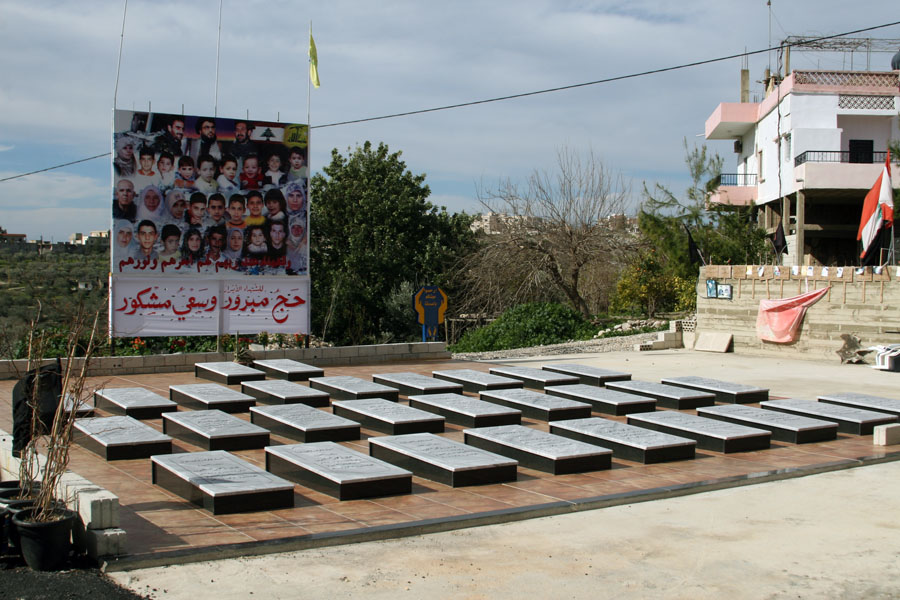
Memorial to the 28 people killed by the Qana airstrike

According to Human Rights Watch on August 2, the initial estimate of 54 persons killed was based on a register of 63 persons who had sought shelter in the basement, and the rescue teams first having located only nine survivors. However, it was later established that 22 had escaped the basement and that 28 bodies had been recovered, of whom 16 were children. There were still 13 people missing, and locals feared they were buried in the rubble.

Human Rights Watch also added that its own researchers, who visited Qana on July 31, the day after the attack, did not find any destroyed military equipment in or near the house. They reported:

"Similarly, none of the dozens of international journalists, rescue workers and international observers who visited Qana on July 30 and 31 reported seeing any evidence of Hezbollah military presence in or around the home. Rescue workers recovered no bodies of apparent Hezbollah fighters from inside or near the building."

=== IDF investigation ===
On August 2, the IDF concluded its investigation into the attack on Qana. The report was not released to the public but was presented to IDF Chief of Staff Dan Halutz and Defense Minister Amir Peretz. In a statement read out to the press, Chief of Staff Halutz's summary of the report was given. The IDF stated that the building was thought to have been empty, and "was struck at 00:25 Sunday by two bombs launched by the IAF. One of the bombs exploded and the other was apparently a dud." The statement accused Hezbollah of using human shields and claimed that the IDF "operated according to information that 'the building was not inhabited by civilians and was being used as a hiding place for terrorists.' Had they known that civilians were in the building, the attack would not have been carried out." The statement also noted that "the building was adjacent to areas from which rockets had been launched towards Israel", and prior to the July 30 attack, "several other structures were attacked in the same area, because they served as terrorist infrastructure."

The IDF did not explicitly take responsibility for the casualties, but Halutz was quoted as saying that he "expressed his sorrow for the deaths of civilians, among them children, in the incident in Qana". Amnesty International responded by describing the inquiry as flawed and "a whitewash", and called for an independent inquiry which has the "capacity to cross borders and talk to survivors of the attack as well as to the forces involved."

Human Rights Watch likewise called for an independent international inquiry, saying that the IDF's report did not explain the attack, that it in effect raised more questions than it answered, and that it contradicted eyewitness accounts of the timing, which denied legitimate military targets were around the building.

== August 6 attack ==
On August 6 the IDF announced that a missile launcher located in the area of Qana which had fired rockets into Haifa was later destroyed in an Israeli airstrike. As part of the announcement the IDF released a video of the launcher which showed three rocket launchers in an area the video described as "between Qana and Zidkin." This area is a large uninhabited area to the southwest of Qana.

== See also ==
- 2006 al-Qaa airstrike
- 2006 Ghaziyeh airstrikes
- 2006 Shiyyah airstrike
- Allegations of war crimes against Israel
- 2006 Marjayoun convoy airstrike
- Salam Daher
- List of extrajudicial killings and political violence in Lebanon
