= Shiyyah =

Coordinates: 33°51′56″N 35°31′03″E

- Interactive map of Shiyyah

Shiyyah or Chiyah (Arabic: الشياح) is a suburb located south of the Lebanese capital of Beirut and is part of Greater Beirut.

== Location ==
Shiyyah is located in the southwest suburbs of the capital Beirut, bordered by Haret Hreik, Ghobeiry, Hadath, Hazmiyeh, Furn-el-chebbak and Ain El Remmaneh. However, before 1956, it used to cover a larger area that included the current districts of Karm el Zeitoun, Hayy el Knissé, Bir Abed and Haret el Mjadlé, as well as Jnah, Ghobeiry, Furn-el-chebbak, Bir Hassan and Ain El Remanneh.

The meaning of its name is vague, and many suppositions were found, with one saying that it means the processing of metal (Shewah). Another theory is the Arabic origin of the name means a kind of tree that is used for silk production (a flourishing industry in this former village). The city was once covered with citrus orchards and extending to the Mediterranean Sea. Today, it is a full part of the demographically huge Beirut outskirts totalling around 60,000 inhabitants.

== Demographics ==
Prior the 1960s, Shiyyah was a predominantly Christian town with a significant local Shiite minority, but the towns' Shia Muslim population soon swelled due to migration. The major surnames or families in Shiyyah are Naïm, Kanj, Rahme, Mahmoud, Nasr, Srouji, Maarouf, Kassem, Farraj, Sous, and El-Khatib.

In 2014, Christians made up 97.20% and Muslims made up 1.38% of registered voters in Shiyyah. 63.31% of the voters were Maronite Catholics, 11.20% were Greek Catholics and 10.63% were Greek Orthodox.

== History ==
Prior to the 1860 civil war, Shiyyah was largely inhabited by Shia Muslims, but many Christian refugees settled in the town following the chaos which ensued.

In May 1988 following three weeks of intense fighting between Amal and Hizbullah, Ghobeiry and Shiyyah were the only districts of Beirut that Amal was able to retain control of, the rest of Southern Beirut coming under Hizbullah control.

On 21 December 1994 a car bomb in Shiyyah killed Fuad Mughniyeh, one brother of Hizbullah commander Imad Mughniyeh. Two other people were killed in the explosion and sixteen wounded.

== See also ==
- Amal Movement militia
- Mountain War (Lebanon)
- Lebanese Civil War
