= Gerhard Conrad (intelligence officer) =

German diplomat (born 1954)

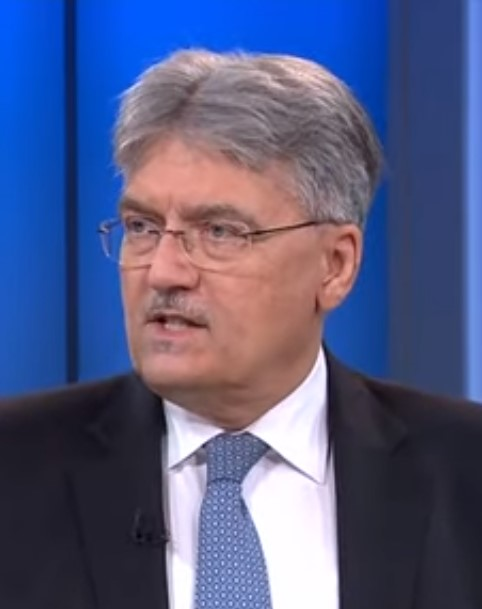
Gerhard Conrad (2022)

Gerhard Conrad (born 1954) is an officer of the Federal Intelligence Service (BND), the foreign intelligence agency of Germany, and one of its foremost experts on the Arab world. A fluent Arabic speaker, he was bureau chief of the BND's Damascus office from 1998 to 2002. He holds a doctorate of Islamic studies. His wife also works as a BND agent.

In 2008, Conrad brokered the deal between Israel and Hezbollah, where the remains of Israeli soldiers Ehud Goldwasser and Eldad Regev were returned to Israel in exchange for the return of Samir Kuntar as well as another four Lebanese men detained in Israeli custody, and the remains of 190 persons captured or killed during the 2006 Lebanon War

In 2011, he coordinated the negotiations between Israel and Hamas resulting in the Gilad Shalit prisoner exchange involving 1,027 Palestinian prisoners and the Israeli prisoner Gilad Shalit.

On December 13, 2015 he was announced as the Head of European Union Intelligence and Situation Centre.

In 2019 he returned to the BND to retire. Conrad was a Visiting Professor at King’s College London.

== Recognitions ==
- Order of Merit of the Federal Republic of Germany
