= Lebanese prisoners in Israel =

Lebanese prisoners in Israel have been a source of contention between Lebanon and Israel and were an issue in the 2006 Lebanon War. The number of such detainees is disputed. According to the Lebanese paramilitary and political party Hezbollah, there are two Lebanese citizens in Israeli prisons, but Israel denies holding them. Hezbollah had demanded the release of Lebanese prisoners as condition for releasing Israeli reservists Ehud Goldwasser and Eldad Regev, captured in the Hezbollah raid which started the 2006 Lebanon War. On July 16, 2008, the Israel Prison Service released five Lebanese prisoners in exchange for the remains of Goldwasser and Regev.

== Context ==
Following the attempted assassination of the Israeli Ambassador to the United Kingdom, Shlomo Argov, by the Abu Nidal Organization, Israel initiated Operation Peace of the Galilee in June 1982, in order to terminate the military activity of the Palestine Liberation Organization and Syrian forces around the Israeli-Lebanese border. With U.S. assistance, Israel and Lebanon reached a withdrawal accord in May 1983, which was then recalled by Lebanon in March 1984, due to pressure from Syria. In 1985, Israel withdrew most of its troops, leaving the South Lebanon Army, an Israeli-supported Lebanese militia, to protect a security buffer zone in southern Lebanon, which Israel considered necessary to prevent attacks on its northern territory. Israel relinquished the security zone and withdrew behind the Blue Line in May 2000.

== Persons named by Hezbollah ==
Hezbollah has named two individuals who it says are Lebanese citizens held in Israeli jails.

- Yehia Skaff is accused of participating in the 1978 Coastal Road massacre. According to Hezbollah, several former Lebanese detainees said they have seen him in an Israeli prison. Israeli sources said he was killed in the massacre with his body never found.
- Ali Faratan is a fisherman. Hezbollah gave no reason for his alleged detention. Israel denies holding him.

Hezbollah demanded the release of Samir Kuntar, Nissim Nasser, and Skaff at the time of the 2004 Israel-Hezbollah prisoner exchange. On June 1, 2008, Nasser was released in exchange for the body parts of Israeli soldiers killed during the 2006 Lebanon war. Kuntar was released in a prisoner exchange on July 16, 2008.

== Missing persons ==
In addition to the above, the following people were listed in a letter dated March 2004 to the United Nations Commission on Human Rights by Lebanon's UN permanent representative as having been arrested during the 1982 Israeli occupation of Lebanon and still missing. The allegations have been denied by Israel.

- Mooussa El Sheikh Selman, from Maarka village. Said to have been arrested on June 8, 1982, and wounded when transported by an ICRC staffer from the rest house of Tyre to the field hospital of the Israeli army near Mealliya. His fate remains unknown.
- Bilal Samadi, said to have been seized on June 4, 1982, with five other persons on the bridge of the Awali River following an Israeli ambush.
- Ibrahim Zein El Din, a teacher in [Baaklin] Secondary School. Said to have been seized by the Israeli forces at his fiancée’s house on October 8, 1982, and transferred to the Israeli intelligence center located then in Ras El Jabal in Aley (Mount Lebanon). Two of his friends, Nazih Abou Ajram and Mounir Chami, who were arrested later on, professed to having seen him chained and naked with torture marks on his body.
- Mohamad Said El Jarrar, from Chebaa village. Said to have been seized in 1979 by Israeli forces and imprisoned in Tal Nahas camp, then transferred to Israeli intelligence in Metlli. Toufic Fakhouri, one of the released detainees, has allegedly said to have recognized Mohamad El Jarrar in 1987, in one of the Israeli detention centers located in Ramallah.
- Jamil Amhaz. Said to have been kidnapped by the Israeli forces in 1984. According to his family, he is imprisoned in the Chateh jail in Israel. Israel denies this.
- Mohamad Ali Hawa. Said to have been arrested by the Israeli forces in 1984 on Bater crossing in Jezzine (Lebanon) and taken to the Aber center. Allegedly, his mother saw him wounded with a bleeding leg.
- Mohamad Ali Gharib is said to have been kidnapped on August 12, 1984, by the Israeli forces on the Bater crossing in Jezzine. He was allegedly transferred to the Homsieh hill then to Israel. His family reported that the freed detainee Ali Noura has reported to have seen him in Atlit Prison in 1985.
- Hassan Ramez Ballout was said to have been arrested in 1984, in his hometown Kfarmelky by the Israeli forces. Ballout allegedly stayed in the Jezzine barracks for eight months and was told to be wounded with infections in his leg. His fate remains unknown.
- Maher Kassir from Deir Kanoun el Naher village. He was allegedly kidnapped by the Israeli forces on June 17, 1984, in the area of the Sciences University located in Chweifat, southern Beirut. His fate is unknown.
- Mohamad El Abouchi from Mina in northern Lebanon. He was said to have been kidnapped in 1990. His family asserts that he is detained in Israel. Israel denies this.
- Jammal Habba from Sidon, southern Lebanon was said to have been kidnapped at the Barbarra checkpoint in 1982. His family asserts that he is in Israel. Israel denies this.
- Samir El Khorfan, a soldier in the Lebanese army is said to have been kidnapped in the Majdalyoun area on October 30, 1983. His fate remains unknown.
- Saadeldine Ahmad Kheir, a Lebanese citizen who was taken in 1982 in Khalda. His fate remains unknown.

People who have been missing since the Israeli military presence in southern Lebanon include:

- Hassan Sami Taha
- Hussein Zeid
- Ibrahim Nour el Din
- Mohamad Moallem
- Nizard Ali Merhi
- Souheil Rammal
- Khaled Kachmor
- Khaled Chahine
- Ali Kachmor
- Said Bleibel
- Taleb Abo Raya
- Ahmed Harbawi

== Deceased militants allegedly kept in Israel ==
There are also some former Lebanese militants, now presumed deceased, and alleged to be kept by Israel in secret graves, including:

- Yahya El Khaled
- Ayad Kassir
- Hussein Daher
- Elias Harb
- Farjallah Fouaani

== See also ==
- Israeli MIA prisoner exchanges
- Lebanese people in Israel
- Suha Bishara - detained 1988-98

== Sources ==
- Jerusalem Post
- ArabicNews
- CNN News
