= 2006 Hezbollah cross-border raid =

Attack in the 2006 Lebanon War

- Part of the 2000–2006 Shebaa Farms conflict and the 2006 Lebanon War
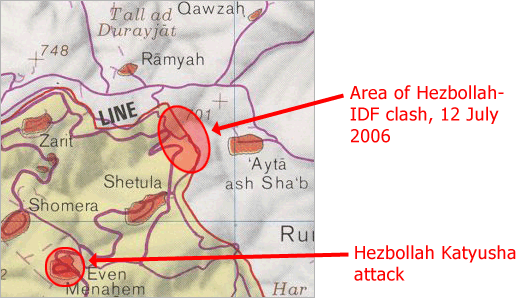
Date	12 July 2006; Around 9:00 am (GMT+2)
Location	Lebanon–Israel border 33°06′01″N 35°19′12″E
Result	Hezbollah victory: Outbreak of the 2006 Lebanon War

Belligerents
Israel	Hezbollah

Casualties and losses
8 killed 2 wounded 2 captured	None
- 2 Israeli civilians wounded

Hezbollah militants carried out a cross-border raid on an Israeli military patrol on 12 July 2006. Using rockets fired on several Israeli towns as a diversion, Hezbollah militants crossed from Lebanon into Israel and ambushed two Israeli Army vehicles, killing three soldiers and capturing two other soldiers. Another five soldiers were killed inside Lebanese territory in a failed rescue attempt. Hezbollah demanded the release of Lebanese prisoners held by Israel in exchange for the release of the captured soldiers. Israel refused and launched a large-scale ground and air campaign across Lebanon in response to the Hezbollah raid. This marked the start of the 2006 Lebanon War and the end of the 2000–2006 Shebaa Farms conflict. Two years later, on 16 July 2008, the bodies of the two captured soldiers were returned to Israel by Hezbollah in exchange for Samir Kuntar and four Hezbollah prisoners.

Hezbollah originally named the cross-border operation "Freedom for Samir Al-Quntar and his brothers", but eventually shortened it to "Operation Truthful Promise" (Arabic: عملية الوعد الصادق).

== Background ==
Hezbollah was formed in 1982 to fight the Israeli invasion of Lebanon. Israel continued to occupy southern Lebanon until 2000. Hezbollah, and many in the Arab world, considered this a victory.

After Israel's withdrawal, Hezbollah priorities shifted to freeing Lebanese citizens from Israeli prisons. A second issue was the "Shebaa Farms" territorial dispute. Hezbollah, Lebanese authorities and Syrian authorities all agreed that Shebaa Farms was Lebanese territory and therefore the fact that Israel was occupying Shebaa Farms implied Israel still occupied Lebanese territory. By contrast, Israel held that Shebaa Farms was Syrian territory, and thus Israel wasn't occupying any Lebanese territory by occupying Shebaa Farms. Later studies conducted by the United Nations has confirmed that the area in fact was Lebanese.

In a landmark prisoner exchange via German mediation in January 2004, 450 Lebanese prisoners held in Israeli jails were exchanged for the bodies of three IDF soldiers in a 2000 raid and a captured IDF colonel. However, Samir al-Quntar and four others were not released. Hezbollah chief Hassan Nasrallah vowed to continue to press for "release of the hostages" from Israel.

The long-time Lebanese prisoner Samir al-Quntar was excluded from the deal. The government of Israel, however, had agreed to a "further arrangement", whereby Israel would release Samir al-Quntar if it was supplied with "tangible information on the fate of captive navigator Ron Arad". According to Harel and Issacharoff the second phase of the prisoner exchange deal was only a "legal gimmick". Israel was not at all satisfied with the information provided by Hezbollah and refused to release Samir al-Quntar. "Cynics may well ask whether it was worth getting entangled in the Second Lebanon War just to keep Kuntar (...) in prison for an extra few years."

The intelligence war between Hezbollah and Israel was heating up. Top Hezbollah official Ghaleb Awali was assassinated in a car bomb attack in the Dahiya in Beirut in July 2004. Israel was the main suspect. As Zvi Bar'el commented; "Awali's killing sends a new message: Israel can get to Hezbollah anywhere in Lebanon". Hezbollah retaliated with sniper fire from Ayta ash-Sha'b which killed two Israeli soldiers at the Nurit post just across the border.

In January 2005 Hezbollah Secretary-General Hassan Nasrallah confirmed that "all options are open" concerning the means to get al-Quntar and the remaining prisoners back. The Lebanese government also demanded that Israel return all Lebanese prisoners and bodies to Lebanon.

A third issue was Israel's systematic violations of Lebanese territory since its withdrawal in 2000. According to the speaker of the Lebanese parliament, Nabih Berri the Lebanese had violated the Blue Line less than 100 times between 2000 and 2006, while "the number of Israeli violations was 11,782 times, by air, sea and land" during the same time.

On 21 November 2005, in a failed raid, Hezbollah sent in a team of its "Special Force" fighters using motorcycles and ATVs to either kill IDF soldiers or capture them alive. The fighters attacked a military outpost in the border village of Ghajar in the Israeli-occupied Golan Heights, manned by Israeli soldiers. The unit's marksman, 20-year-old Corporal David Markovitch, shot a rocket-propelled grenade being carried by the Hezbollah fighters, killing three, then shot and killed two more. Israel launched airstrikes on Southern Lebanon. During the brief clash, Hezbollah also fired katushya rockets at towns in northern Israel.

On 28 May 2006, less than two months before the Lebanon War began, Hezbollah fired rockets into northern Israel in response to the killing in Lebanon of Mahmoud al-Majzoub, a top Palestinian Islamic Jihad leader. Israel retaliated by launching air strikes on Hezbollah bases in Lebanon and firing artillery across the border. The fighting was described as the most intense since the Israeli withdrawal in 2000, though it was over quickly due to a UN-sponsored cease fire.

The IDF wanted to an avoid all out war with Hezbollah but was frustrated by the lack of action on the political and diplomatic level. It knew that Hezbollah was not interested in hitting Israeli civilian targets. It adopted a policy of "zero targets" implying that IDF presence was reduced to a minimum whenever the risk of Hezbollah kidnapping attempts was deemed to be high. Ironically, during alerts, the "red zones" along the border became off-limit to military personnel but were open to civilian traffic. A few days before the abduction (8 July), Udi Adam, the head of Northern Command, out of uniform even took his wife for a drive in a civilian car in one of the red zones.

The head of Northern Command Maj. Gen. Adam warned, only a day before the abduction, in a meeting with Prime Minister Olmert, Defence Minister Peretz Chief-of-Staff Halutz and some generals: "We’re on the verge of another crisis on the Lebanese border...It’s a stagnant swamp down there. If we don’t progress on the Shaba’a Farms issue and the Lebanese prisoners, this story will blow up and turn into a catastrophe. "

In the months leading up to 12 July attack, Brigadier General Ishai Efroni reported seeing increased movement across the border fence, including more armed Hezbollah patrols. He had repeatedly seen burden-laden donkeys, which he had believed were being led by innocent farmers, but after the incident suspected were laden with arms and equipment. After the 28 May rocket attack, the general, who at 41 had spent much of his career along the northern border, "got the feeling something had changed big time".

Hezbollah had created a deep underground bunker amongst the underbrush, just above the IDF armoured patrol track. The "camp was stocked with food, water, radios, ak-47 rifles, antitank missiles and diagrams detailing the insignia and size of Israeli military units."

Israeli military intelligence was certain that Hezbollah was planning an attack, and correctly suspected that it would take place at a portion of the border known as Milepost 105, where the road that ran along the border dipped into a wadi, where IDF troops and humvees would be out of sight of nearby IDF observation posts and dug-in tanks, creating a "dead zone". On 27 June 2006, the IDF issued a high alert at Milepost 105, and stationed a team from the Egoz Reconnaissance Unit in ambush positions to intercept any Hezbollah raid. By 2 July, after no attack had come, the Egoz team withdrew.

On the night of 11 July, IDF soldiers noted several reports of contact along the electric fence near Milepost 105, and an Israeli patrol spotted 20 Hezbollah fighters near the location, but this information never filtered down to IDF reserve units due to patrol the area on 12 July.

== The raid ==
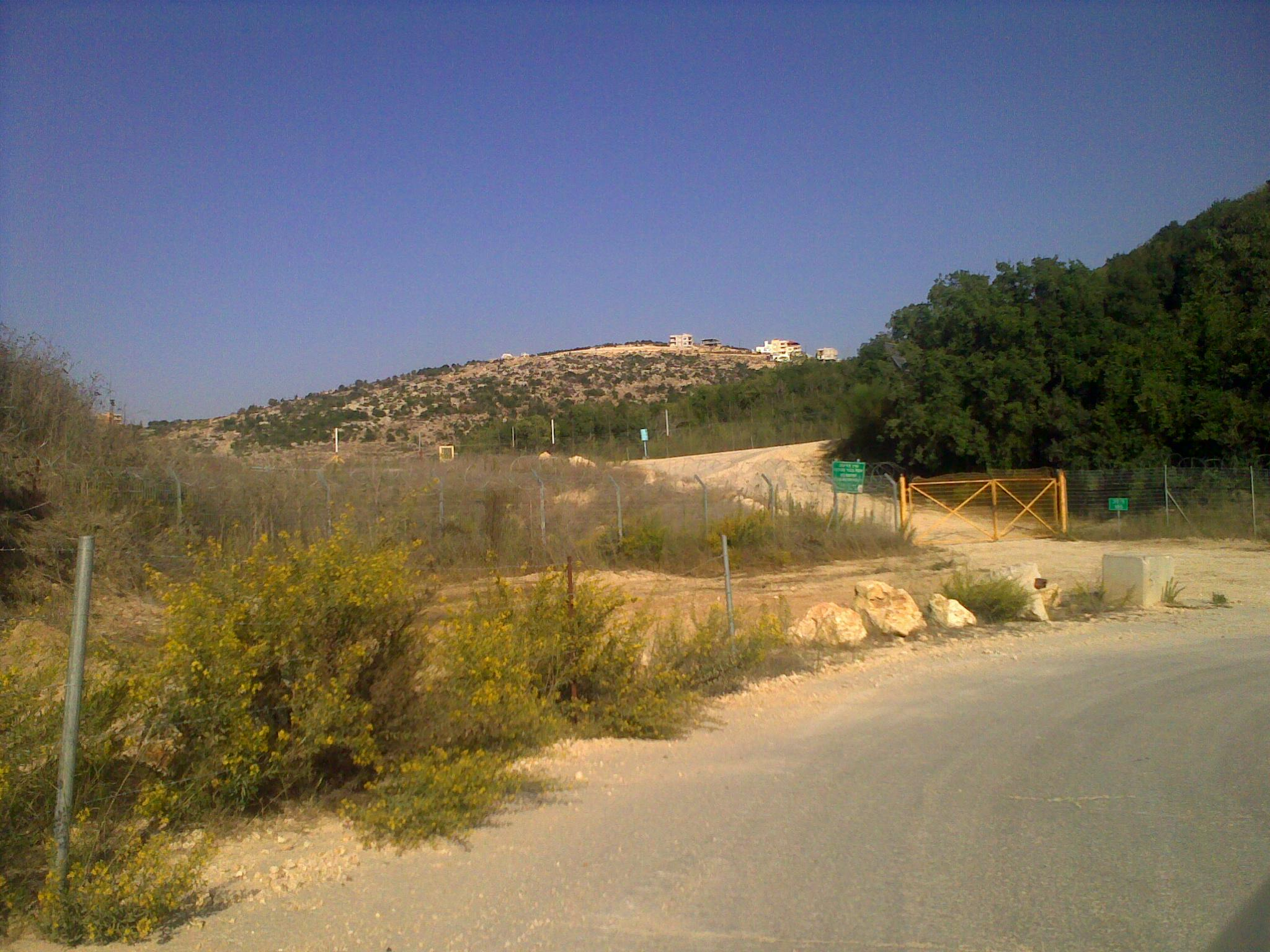
The site of the cross-border raid

On the early morning of 12 July 2006, a ground contingent of Hezbollah fighters crossed the border into northern Israel, and used wire cutters and explosives to break the fence. They hid in ambush in the wadi of Milepost 105. Another squad of Hezbollah fighters positioned itself in thick undergrowth on the Lebanese side of the border. At 2:20 AM, the IDF noted a "red touch", meaning that someone or something had touched the electric border fence, in the area adjacent to Milepost 105. An Israeli patrol scanned the area but did not spot the Hezbollah fighters who had crossed into Israel.

At around 9:00 a.m. local time (06:00 UTC), on 12 July 2006, the attack began. Hezbollah initiated diversionary Katyusha rocket and mortar attacks on Israeli military positions and border villages, including Zar'it and Shlomi. Two civilians were wounded. Simultaneously, Hezbollah fighters fired on seven army posts, knocking out surveillance cameras and command communications.

At about same time, the Hezbollah fighters in ambush positions at Milepost 105 attacked two Israeli armored Humvees carrying out a routine patrol in the area. Prior to the attack, one of the Hezbollah fighters, who was hiding among weeds with an anti-tank missile, had been spotted from a nearby IDF observation tower, but the tower was apparently unable to relay this information due to communication problems. The two Humvees were manned by reservist soldiers. The lead Humvee, codenamed 4, contained four soldiers. The overall commander of the patrol, Ehud Goldwasser, sat in the commander's seat, next to the driver, Razak Muadi, while Eldad Regev and Tomer Weinberg sat in the back. The second Humvee, codenamed 4A, had three soldiers instead of the usual four. Shani Turgeman commanded the Humvee, while Wassim Nazal drove it and combat soldier Eyal Benin sat in the back. As the Humvees passed, the Hezbollah fighters waited for them to drive around the bend until they were completely exposed. As the trailing Humvee passed the highest point and began descending downward, the first Hezbollah squad on the Lebanese side of the border attacked the convoy by launching anti-tank missiles and heavy machine gun fire, which destroyed the second IDF Humvee. Nazal was killed when the Humvee was destroyed by anti-tank fire, while Turgeman and Benin survived the initial volley and were shot dead while attempting to escape from the burning vehicle. The Hezbollah squad on the Israeli side of the border shot two RPGs at the first Humvee from a short range. Goldwasser was killed and Regev and Weinberg were seriously wounded, while Muadi was slightly wounded. Muadi dragged Weinberg out and they managed to escape the vehicle and hide in nearby bushes. The second Hezbollah squad headed towards the first IDF Humvee and killed Regev and took Goldwasser and Regev's bodies, and escaped back into Lebanon in a waiting car and drove off through olive orchards to the Lebanese border village of Aita al-Shaab. The entire incident took no more than 10 minutes.

During the incident, the command and communications room at the Zar'it military camp received reports of IDF units taking fire, and the explosions from Hezbollah rocket attacks in the Zar'it area were heard in the camp. IDF personnel were initially scrambling for information. The first Israeli soldier to understand what was happening was a Sergeant-Major who heard the report "4, 4A, collision" over the communications network. He then informed his company commander. As Milepost 105 was a known potential weak point, eight soldiers and officers set out towards that spot. Meanwhile, communications with units in the area were checked, which took time as the area was under fire and not all commanders could immediately respond. However, even before the check was completed, it was clear that Humvees 4 and 4A were not responding. About 45 minutes after the attack, eight soldiers and officers finally arrived at Milepost 105, just as Muadi had managed to report the attack to another soldier on his cell phone. After reaching the scene, the patrol encountered Muadi and Weinberg and the two destroyed Humvees, along with two bodies lying next to one of the Humvees with a third body visible inside. A quick count of the dead and wounded verified the fears of an abduction.

The Hannibal Directive is an IDF order stating that abductions of Israeli soldiers must be prevented by all means, including shooting at or shelling a get-away car, thereby risking the lives of the captives. The Hannibal Directive was invoked and this triggered an instant aerial surveillance and airstrikes inside Lebanon to limit Hezbollah's ability to move the soldiers it had seized. "If we had found them, we would have hit them, even if it meant killing the soldiers," a senior Israeli official said. Lt. Col. Ishai Efroni, deputy commander of the Baram Brigade, sent a Merkava Mark II tank, an armored personnel carrier and a helicopter in pursuit. Crossing into Lebanon, they headed down a dirt track lined with Lebanese border defenses. However, they veered onto a road near a known Hezbollah outpost along the border. The tank was destroyed by an IED with an estimated 200–300 kilograms of explosives, killing the crew of four. One soldier was killed and two were lightly wounded by mortar fire as they attempted to recover the bodies.

Originally Israel assumed that both captives were alive. In the end of July Vice Premier Shimon Peres assured the families of the captured that both were "alive and well".

On 2 August, Israeli special forces raided the Dar al-Hikma hospital in Baalbek in the Bekaa valley, believed to be "the place where kidnapped soldiers... were treated after they were abducted". The soldiers were not found at the place. The Lebanese minister Ali Hassan Khalil refers in his memoirs to a conversation he had with Hussein al-Khalil, a senior adviser to Hezbollah leader Hassan Nasrallah in the beginning of August 2006. al-Khalil told him that the two soldiers both survived the capture but were killed weeks later by Israeli bombardment. There were however no suggestions that Israel deliberately had targeted the two prisoners. According to al-Khalil it was Hezbollah's use of heavy rockets and Israel's response by expanding the area of bombardment that led to the two Israelis' death. The IDF dismissed these claims as "blatant fabrications" and psychological warfare. An examination of the bodies of Goldwasser and Regev later determined that the two reservists were killed during the initial cross-border attack and not in captivity. Goldwasser was killed by injuries to the chest sustained in the rocket-propelled grenade attack on his Humvee. Regev was shot in the head, possibly while he was trying to escape.

== Aftermath ==
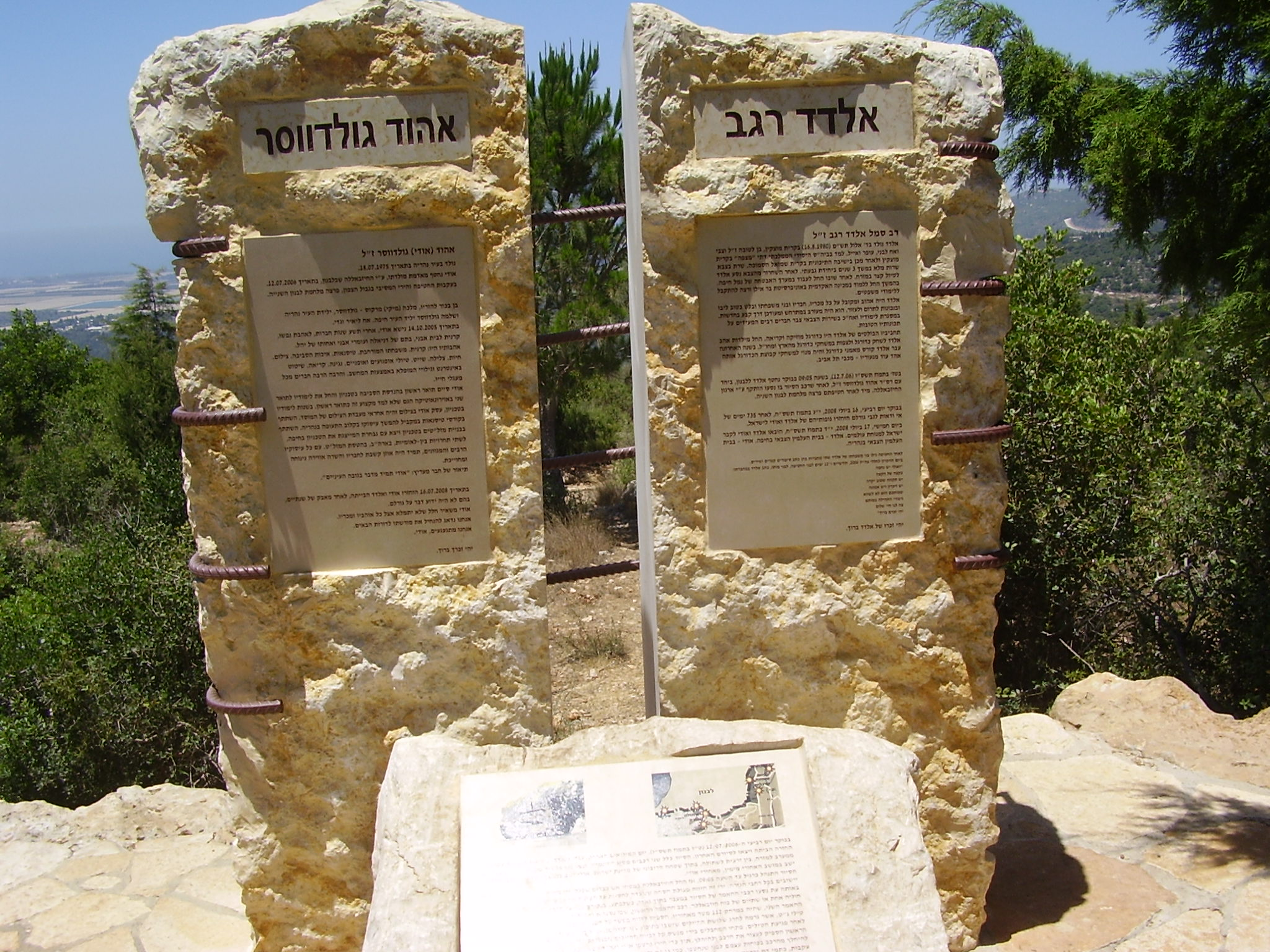
A monument at a park in Adamit Park, honoring the memory of two of the victims of the attack – Eldad Regev and Ehud Goldwasser

The IDF confirmed the capture of the two Israeli soldiers on 13 July. They were both reservists on their last day of operational duty.

Hezbollah released a statement saying, "Implementing our promise to free Arab prisoners in Israeli jails, our strugglers have captured two Israeli soldiers in southern Lebanon." Later on, Hassan Nasrallah declared that "No military operation will return them...[t]he prisoners will not be returned except through one way: indirect negotiations and a trade of prisoners."

The incident prompted the start of the 2006 Lebanon War. Israel responded with airstrikes and artillery shelling of Hezbollah targets, and a naval blockade against Lebanon, followed by a ground invasion. During the war, the Hezbollah commander who organized the raid, Khalid Bazzi, was killed in an Israeli drone strike during the Battle of Bint Jbeil. After 34 days of fighting, a cease-fire came into effect. During the war, Israeli forces took four Hezbollah fighters prisoners, and captured the bodies of ten more.

On 6 August the IDF announced one of the Hezbollah participants was captured in a commando operation.

On 27 August 2006, Nasrallah denied in an interview with New TV that the capture of the two soldiers was the cause of the war. It only advanced a long planned war for a few months. But he added: "If there was even a 1 percent chance that the July 11 capturing operation would have led to a war like the one that happened, would you have done it? I would say no, absolutely not, for humanitarian, moral, social, security, military, and political reasons. [...] What happened is not an issue of a reaction to a capturing operation... what happened was already planned for. The fact that it happened in July has averted a situation that would have been a lot worse, had the war been launched in October."

On the other side, however; Israeli P.M. Ehud Olmert testified before the Winograd Commission that he had fully planned for an intensive war upon an abduction as early as March.

Nasrallah stated on 31 October 2006 that indirect talks with Israel on hostage return had begun.

Haaretz reported in March 2007 that Prime Minister Ehud Olmert testified to the Winograd Commission that several meetings regarding Hezbollah were held upon his taking office, and that in response to the likely scenario of soldiers again being abducted, he chose one of several plans of action instead of having to make a snap judgement if and when such a scenario occurred.

On 6 December 2006, a previously classified report released by Israel stated that the two soldiers were seriously wounded during the abduction.

On 29 June 2008, Prime Minister Ehud Olmert declared the two captured soldiers dead. On 16 July 2008 Hezbollah swapped the bodies of Ehud and Eldad for Samir Kuntar, four Hezbollah fighters captured during the 2006 Lebanon war, and the bodies of 200 killed PLO and Hezbollah fighters, eight of whom were captured in the 2006 war.

== IDF fatalities ==
=== Hizballah cross-border raid ===
- Sgt.-Maj.(res.) Eyal Benin (5th Infantry Brigade), 22, of Beersheba
- Sgt.-Maj.(res.) Shani Turgeman (5th Infantry Brigade), 24, of Beit Shean
- Sgt.-Maj. Wassim Nizal (5th Infantry Brigade), 26, of Yanuah

=== IDF incursion into Lebanon ===
- St.-Sgt. Alexei Kushnirski (7th Armored Brigade), 21, of Nes Ziona
- St.-Sgt. Yaniv Bar-On (7th Armored Brigade), 20, of Maccabim
- Sgt. Gadi Mosayev (7th Armored Brigade), 20, of Akko
- Sgt. Shlomi Yirmiyahu (7th Armored Brigade), 20, of Rishon Lezion
- Sgt. Nimrod Cohen (Nahal Infantry Brigade), 19, of Mitzpe Shalem

== IDF prisoners ==
- Sgt. Ehud Goldwasser (5th Infantry Brigade), 30, of Nahariya
- Sgt. Eldad Regev (5th Infantry Brigade), 25, of Kiryat Mozkin

== See also ==
- List of extrajudicial killings and political violence in Lebanon
- List of invasions in the 21st century
