= 1979 Nahariya attack =

1979 militant attack in Israel

- Part of Palestinian insurgency in South Lebanon
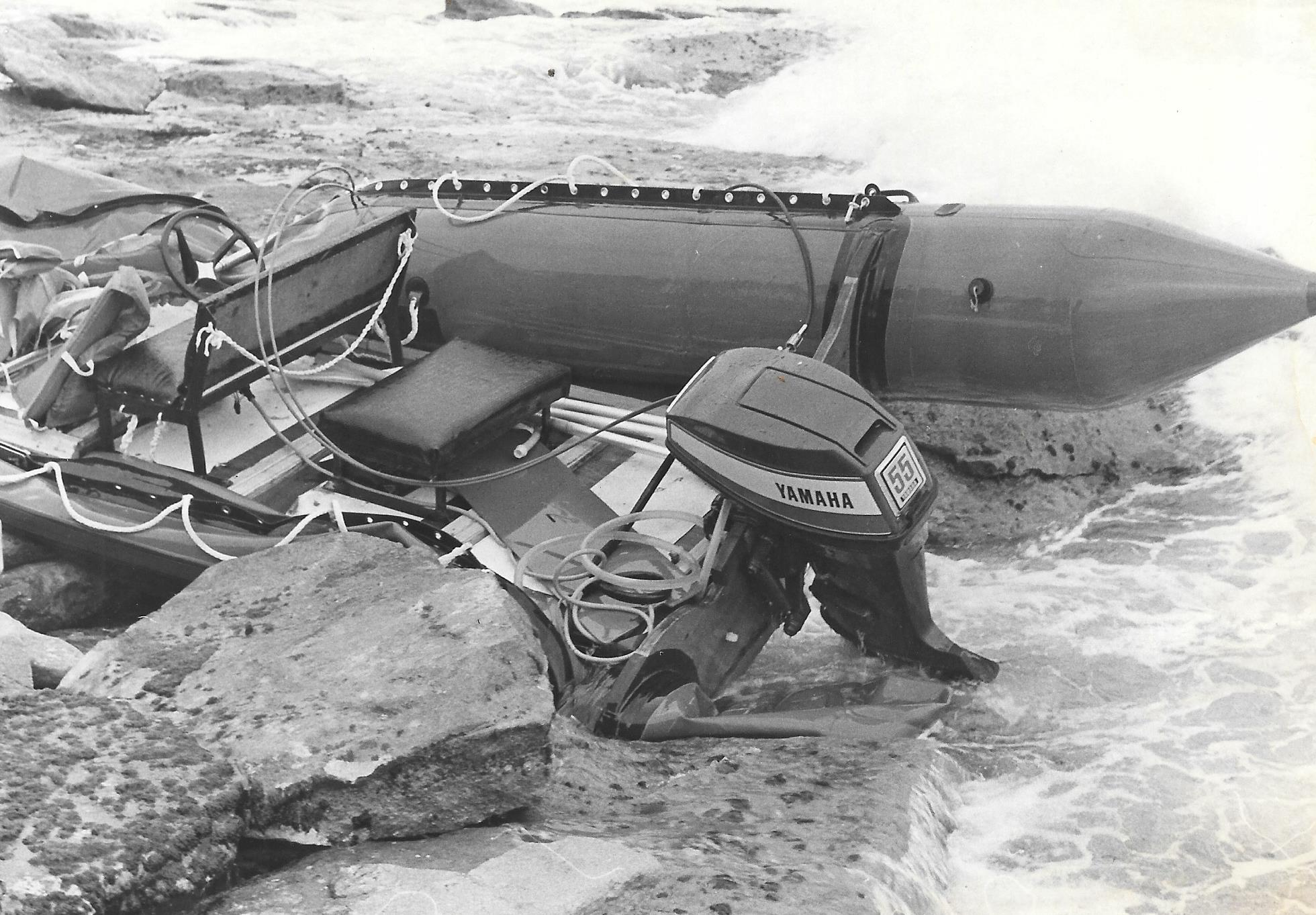
- The rubber boat which the attackers used.

- The attack site
- Native name: הפיגוע בנהריה ב-1979
- Location: 33°0′51″N 35°5′29″E; Nahariya, Israel
- Date: 22 April 1979; 47 years ago
- Attack type: Shooting spree, Kidnapping
- Deaths: 4 Israeli civilians, including 2 children (+ 2 attackers)
- Perpetrator: Palestinian Liberation Front (PLF) claimed responsibility.
- No. of participants: 4

The 1979 Nahariya attack (codenamed by its perpetrators as the Nasser Operation) was a raid by four Palestinian Liberation Front (PLF) militants in Nahariya, Israel on 22 April 1979.

The group, consisting of Abdel Majeed Asslan, Mhanna Salim al-Muayed, and Ahmed al-Abras, and led by 16-year-old Samir Kuntar, used a small, 55 horsepower (41 kW) boat to travel from Tyre, Lebanon to Israel. During the attack they killed three Israelis, including a father and two of his young children. Another child was accidentally suffocated in efforts to hide her from the attackers. Kuntar and al-Abras were captured, convicted of murder by an Israeli court, and sentenced to several life sentences. Kuntar denied killing the civilians, saying they were killed by Israeli forces' fire. Both Kuntar and al-Abras were later set free in prisoner swap deals conducted between Israel and Lebanese militant organizations – al-Abras in 1985, and Kuntar in 2008.

In retaliation for the attack, Israeli forces bombarded a Palestinian refugee camp, killing three civilians.

== Details of the attack ==
=== Arrival ===
On 22 April 1979, a group of four Palestinian Liberation Front (PLF) militants entered Israel from Lebanon by boat. The group was headed by Samir Kuntar (born in 1962) and included Abdel Majeed Asslan (born in 1955), Mhanna Salim Al-Muayed (born in 1960) and Ahmed al-Abras (born in 1949) – all PLF members of the under the leadership of Abu Abbas. The group departed from the seashore of Tyre in Southern Lebanon using a 55 horse-powered motorized rubber boat with an 88 km/h speed. Their goal was to attack Nahariya, 10 kilometers away from the Lebanese border. Around midnight they arrived at the coastal town of Nahariya.

=== Killing of Eliyahu Shahar ===
Upon landing on the beach in Nahariya, the group followed instructions issued in Beirut – which included finding a police officer and killing him. They knocked on the door of a private house and called out in Arabic via the intercom, frightening the residents into calling the police. Then, they killed responding police officer Eliyahu Shahar. According to the Israeli security services' reconstruction of the incident, Shahar was killed after he got out of his vehicle and fired two warning shots into the air. Kuntar's group responded with a massive burst of gunfire. Samir Kuntar boasted that he alone shot 30 bullets in this incident.

=== Raid on apartment building and kidnapping ===
The group then entered an apartment building on 61 Jabotinsky Street planning to abduct two or three people and take them back to Lebanon. One of the PFLP men, Abdel Majeed Asslan, broke into the apartment of Charles Shapiro, 34, a recent immigrant from South Africa, after the doors to his apartment had been shot up. Shapiro, who was armed with a .22 caliber magnum revolver, shot Asslan dead. Next, Kuntar's group encountered Moshe Sasson, a resident who was trying to reach the building's bomb shelter carrying his two young daughters, one under each arm. Kuntar shoved Sasson and slammed a handgun into the back of his skull. However, Sasson escaped when the hall lights suddenly went out, and hid under a parked car. The three remaining militants then broke into the apartment of the Haran family. They took 31-year-old Danny Haran hostage along with his four-year-old daughter, Einat. The mother, Smadar Haran, was able to hide in a crawl space above the bedroom with her two-year-old daughter Yael, and a neighbor – Sasson's wife. Smadar Haran accidentally suffocated Yael to death while attempting to quiet her whimpering, which would have revealed their hiding place.

=== Shootout on the beach ===
Danny, Einat and Yael Haran. According to eyewitnesses and forensic reports, Kuntar shot Danny at close range in the back, in front of his daughter, and then killed the girl Einat, by smashing her skull against the rocks with the butt of his rifle.

Kuntar's group then took Danny and Einat down to the beach, where a shootout erupted with Israeli policemen and a squad of soldiers from the elite Sayeret Golani special forces unit.

According to eyewitnesses, when Kuntar's group found that the rubber boat they'd arrived in was disabled by gunfire, Kuntar shot Danny at close range in the back, in front of his daughter, and drowned him in the sea to ensure he was dead. Next, according to forensic evidence and eyewitness court testimony, Kuntar killed the girl by smashing her skull against the rocks with the butt of his rifle. A second militant, Mhanna Salim Al-Muayed, was killed in the shootout on the beach. Kuntar and the fourth member of the group, Ahmed Assad Abras, were captured.

=== Fatalities ===
The four Israeli victims of the attack were:

- Police officer Eliyahu Shahar (24 years old).
- Danny Haran (32 year-old).
- Einat Haran, Danny's 4-year-old daughter.
- In addition, Danny's other daughter, two-year-old Yael, was accidentally suffocated by her mother, who was trying to keep the young girl quiet as they hid from the militants.

== Retaliation ==
The day after the attack, Israeli Navy gunboats bombarded Nahr el-Bared, a Palestinian refugee camp in Beirut described by an Israeli military spokesman as a major base for the PFLP. The bombardment lasted an hour, and three civilians were reportedly killed.

On 19 December 2015, Kuntar was killed by an explosion destroying a six-story residential building in Jaramana on the outskirts of Damascus. Hezbollah and the state run Syrian Arab News Agency reported that the building was destroyed by an air-to-surface missile launched by the Israeli Air Force.

== Trial ==
The pathologist's report, declassified in 2008, showed that 4-year-old Einat Haran's brain tissue was found on Kuntar's rifle.

Kuntar went over to Einat Haran and hit her head twice with the butt of his rifle, with the intent of killing her, (...) The other defendant also struck her head forcefully. As a result of the blows, Einat suffered skull fractures and fatal brain damage, causing her death. They murdered the hostages – a helpless father and daughter, in cold blood. (...) By these acts the defendants reached an all-time moral low (...) an unparalleled satanic act (...) the punishments we are about to impose on the defendants cannot begin to match the brutality of their actions."

— Verdict of Samir Kuntar and Ahmed AlAbras

Samir Kuntar and Ahmed AlAbras were convicted of murdering four people by an Israeli court in 1980, and sentenced to four life sentences, and an additional 47 years for injuries inflicted. Samir Kuntar denied killing the two civilians. Kuntar did admit to killing an Israeli policeman, adding that the goal of the operation was only to capture Israelis, not kill them.

On 13 July 2008, after being classified for nearly thirty years, File No. 578/79, containing the evidence and testimony from Kuntar's 1980 trial, was first published. According to the file, evidence presented by the pathologist at the trial showed that Einat Haran was killed by the force of a blunt instrument – most likely a rifle butt. The pathologist's report also showed that Einat's brain tissue was found on Kuntar's rifle.

Immediately following his capture, when his remand was extended, Kuntar confessed that he had bludgeoned Einat to death with the butt of his rifle. Later, however, when testifying in court, Kuntar denied the charges. In his testimony, Kuntar asserted that Israeli gunfire had killed Danny Haran as soldiers burst in to free him, and that he did not see what happened to Einat after passing out from blood lost from five bullet wounds. He explained that the group's goal had been to take hostages back to Lebanon, and that he had taken the 4-year-old to prevent Israeli police from shooting at them.

According to some sources Samir Kuntar and Ahmed al-Abras were sentenced to 5 life terms and that two police officers were killed.

== Aftermath ==
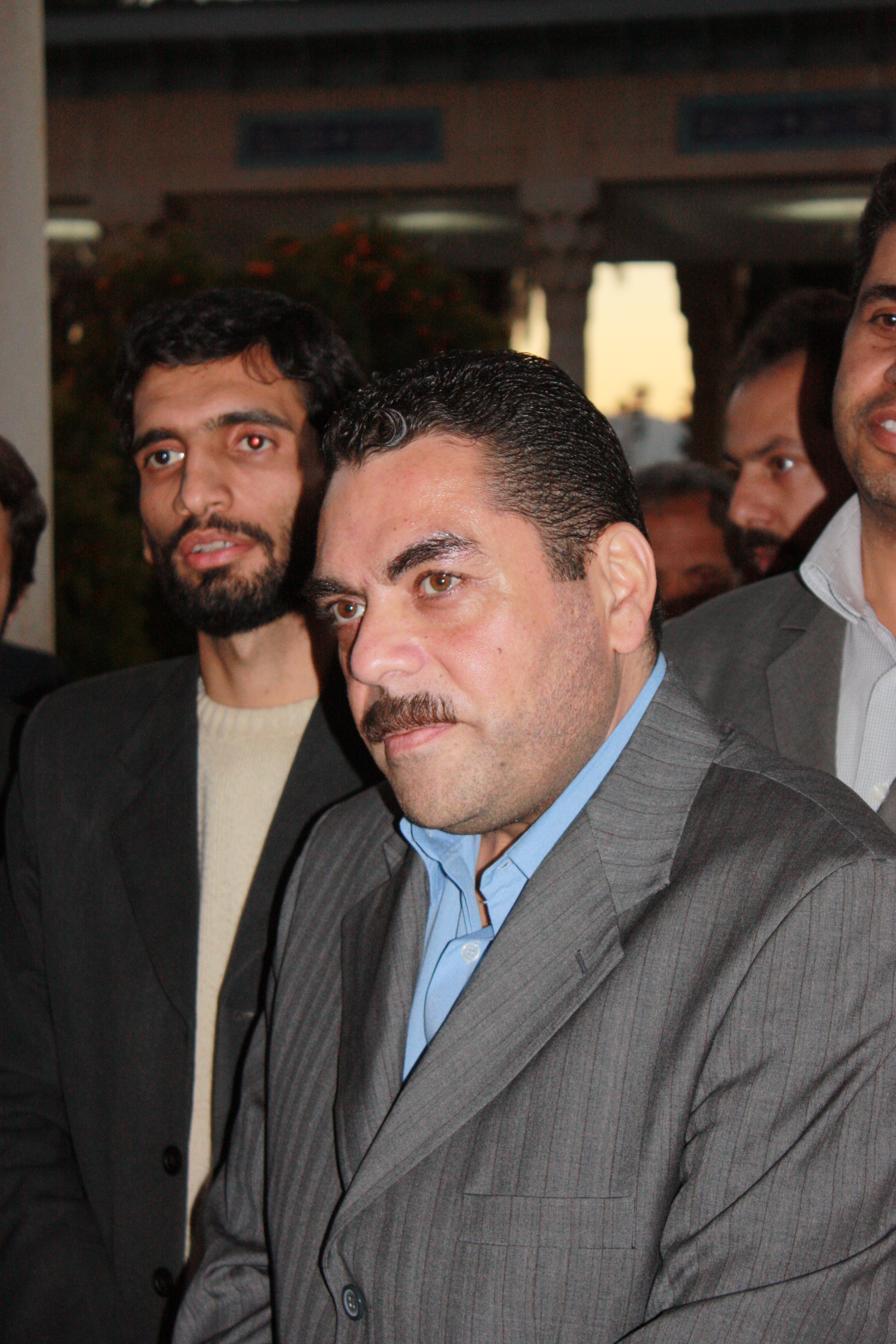
Samir Kuntar. In Israel, Kuntar was considered the perpetrator of one of the most brutal terrorist attacks in the country's history, while in Lebanon he was widely regarded as a national hero.

The killing of Einat Haran is regarded as one of the most brutal terror attacks in the history of Israel. A day after the attack, Abu Abbas, the PLF's leaders, announced from Beirut that the attack in Nahariya had been carried out "to protest the signing of the Egyptian–Israeli Peace Treaty" at Camp David the previous year.

In 1980, Smadar Haran married Yakov Kaiser, a clinical psychologist who had been severely wounded in the 1973 Yom Kippur War. They have two daughters. Smadar is now a psychotherapist with a master's degree in social work. Ahmed AlAbras was freed by Israel in the Jibril Agreement of May 1985. According to Leonard A. Cole, Smadar Haran led a campaign in Israel to honor the victims of terrorism just as it does its fallen soldiers, and in 2003 she opposed the release of Samir Kuntar in exchange for the bodies of the 3 Israeli soldiers captured by Hezbollah during the 2000 Hezbollah cross-border raid, and for Elchanan Tannenbaum, the Israeli businessman and former IDF colonel who was kidnapped by Hezbollah in Dubai. Israeli Foreign Minister Silvan Shalom and Prime Minister Ariel Sharon said that "The murder of a family in Israel is unforgivable" and refused to release Kuntar in the 2003 swap.

Samir Kuntar spent nearly three decades in prison before being released on 16 July 2008 as part of an Israel-Hezbollah prisoner swap. He denied killing Danny and Einat (the child and her father), but admitted to killing Eliyahu Shachar, the policeman. He never expressed remorse for the killings. In Israel, Kuntar was considered the perpetrator of one of the most brutal terrorist attacks in the country's history, while in Lebanon he was widely regarded as a national hero. He was killed on 19 December 2015, in a suspected Israeli airstrike, though Israel did not confirm this and the Free Syrian Army would later take credit for killing Kuntar.
