= Palestinian Liberation Front (Abd ul-Fattah Ghanim wing) =

PLF faction led by Abd ul-Fattah Ghanim

The Palestinian Liberation Front (Arabic: جبهة التحرير الفلسطينية), sometimes referred to as the Palestinian Liberation Front (Abd ul-Fattah Ghanim wing) (Arabic: جبهة التحرير الفلسطينية (جناح عبد الفتاح غانم))), was a Palestinian political faction led by Abd ul-Fattah Ghanim.

As Col. Abu Musa revolted in Lebanon against Yasser Arafat's leadership, the erstwhile Palestinian Liberation Front had been divided in camps supporting Arafat (Abu Abbas), a neutral group (Talat Yaqub) and a group supporting Abu Musa (led by Ghanim). The Ghanim-led PLF emerged from a split in the Damascus-based PLF faction of Talat Yaqub. The Ghanim-faction sought to rally rejectionist groups and individuals in Yarmouk Camp, and reached out to the Palestinian Popular Committees (linked to the Syrian Communist Party of Labour). The Ghanim PLF faction published a journal called Al-Qaeda (القاعدة, 'The Base') from Damascus.

In January 1984 the PLF office in Damascus was stormed by the Ghanim faction and Talat Yaqub was held hostage. Yaqub was released after Syrian intervention and the Ghanim faction relocated to Libya. Publication of Al-Qaeda discontinued and the Palestinian Popular Committees fell apart.

Ghanim held the post of Central Committee Secretary in his faction. Ghanim's PLF faction was associated with the National Alliance. However, by the time the National Alliance evolved into the Palestine National Salvation Front the Ghanim PLF faction had become largely dormant, and thus allowing Talat Yaqub's PLF to become part of the PNSF instead.

In 2003 Ghanim founded a new political party, the Palestinian Democratic Convention.
