= Hussein al-Khalil =

Lebanese Hezbollah leader (born 1955)

- Born: Hussein al-Khalil; 1955 (age 70–71); Burj al-Barajneh, Beirut, Lebanon

Hussein al-Khalil (Arabic: حسين الخليل; 1955 –) is a senior figure within Hezbollah. After serving as a commander in the Palestinian militant group, Fatah, he became involved with Hezbollah, founding and heading its security services. He later moved to Hezbollah's political wing, serving as an advisor to secretary-general Hassan Nasrallah for over 20 years.

== Biography ==
Al-Khalil studied mathematics. In the 1970s, he was a member of the Palestinian militant group, Fatah. During the 1978 South Lebanon conflict, he served as a commander in Tyre. After Fatah evacuated to Tunis in the 1982 Lebanon War, he became involved with Hezbollah, which was then in its early days. In 1982, Al-Khalil set up and oversaw Hezbollah's intelligence services in the Beqaa Valley in conjunction with Islamic Amal. In 1985, he was part of Hezbollah leadership in southern Lebanon and met with Syrian President Hafez al-Assad during the Lebanon hostage crisis.

Al-Khalil pulled back from military operations and became involved in Hezbollah's political wing. Around 1990, he was appointed head of the Politburo, a group of 15 clergy who organize committees related to recruitment, propaganda, and support services. In 1995, he was first appointed as a political advisor to secretary-general Hassan Nasrallah, a position he held until Nasrallah's death in 2024. He has been called Nasrallah's "political right-hand man" and Hezbollah's "second-in-command".

During the Second Intifada, Al-Khalil said that Hezbollah supported Palestinians but would not fight for them or permit them to attack Israel from Lebanese territory. He told Washington Report on Middle East Affairs that the US categorizes people as terrorists if they do not support US interests, which is leading to anti-American sentiment. In 2003, he criticized a US proposal to resolve the conflict between Israel and Palestine, stating that the US was acting in Israeli interests. Additionally, he declined US demands that Hezbollah disarm and withdraw from southern Lebanon.

During its 2006 cross-border raid, Hezbollah captured two Israeli soldiers. Prime Minister Fouad Siniora called Al Khalil to his office to express concern that the Israeli response would be harsh, like the recent conflict in Gaza. According to two Lebanese officials quoted by the Washington Post, Al Khalil responded: "Lebanon is not Gaza". The ensuing war caused immense destruction. Hezbollah later exchanged the soldiers' remains with Israel for several prisoners. According to a 2011 memoir about the raid by health minister Ali Hassan Khalil, Al-Khalil had stated in 2006 that the two soldiers were killed by the Israeli military in a bombing. He stated that Hezbollah had attempted to prevent their deaths and "It's ironic – Israel kills the prisoners on whose behalf it declared war". The Israeli government denied the accusation as propaganda and said that forensic evidence indicated that Hezbollah was responsible.

After the government instituted new measures against Hezbollah in 2008, there was an armed conflict between Hezbollah and pro-government militias. Al-Khalil blamed the Lebanese government for the outbreak of violence, accusing it of serving US interests. In 2018, the US and the Gulf Cooperation Council sanctioned ten Hezbollah officials, including Nasrallah and Al-Khalil.

After Nasrallah's assassination, Al-Khalil served as political advisor to the new secretary-general Naim Qassem. In July 2025, US envoy Tom Barrack visited Lebanon to push for Hezbollah's disarmament. Lebanese politicians, including Al-Khalil, negotiated a response to the US which included Hezbollah's withdrawal from southern Lebanon and the government's sole control over weapons. In August, Al-Khalil stated that US attempts to disarm Hezbollah were a violation of the 2024 Israel–Lebanon ceasefire agreement. He accused the US of trying to prevent Lebanon from defending itself from attempts to turn it into an "American-Israeli colony". According to L'Orient Today, Al-Khalil has rarely made public statements since before the 2024 war but is still involved in political negotiations.

== See also ==
- Jihad Council
