= Gerhard Conrad =

Gerhard Conrad may refer to:

- Gerhard Conrad (intelligence officer) (born 1954), agent of the Federal Intelligence Service, the foreign intelligence agency of Germany
- Gerhard Conrad (pilot) (1895–1982), Generalleutnant in the Luftwaffe during World War II
