= Tuhama Mahmoud Ma'rouf =

Syrian dentist (born 1964)

Tuhama Mahmoud Ma'rouf تهامة محمود معروف
- Born: b. 1964
- Education: Aleppo University
- Occupation: dentist
- Known for: 2010–11 imprisonment
- Political party: Communist Labour Party
- Spouse: Bakr Sidqi

Tuhama Mahmoud Ma'rouf (Arabic: تهامة محمود معروف; born 1964) is a Syrian dentist who was detained from February 2010 to June 2011 for her involvement in the banned Communist Labour Party in the early 1990s. Amnesty International designated her a prisoner of conscience, "detained solely for the peaceful exercise of her right to freedom of expression and association".

== Arrest and imprisonment ==
Ma'rouf was originally detained in 1993 for her involvement with the PCA, along with eight other female activists. The arrests were part of a general crackdown on the party which effectively destroyed it.

She was then found guilty and sentenced in absentia on 5 November 1995 by the Supreme State Security Court (SSSC) of violating Article 306 of Syria's Penal Code, "membership in a secret organization which aims to change the economic and social status of the state". However, for unknown reasons, authorities did not arrest her to begin her sentence until 6 February 2010 in Aleppo. Three days later, she appeared before the court and was ordered to be transferred to Adra prison to serve her sentence of six years' imprisonment. On 18 February 2011, she began a hunger strike to demand a transfer to a woman's prison.

Amnesty International protested her imprisonment and called for her immediate release, as did the Committee on Human Rights of the US National Academy of Sciences, the Damascus Center for Human Rights Studies, and Human Rights Watch.

Ma'rouf was released on 2 June 2011 as part of a general amnesty for political dissidents following the start of the Arab Spring protests.

== Personal life ==
Ma'rouf received a degree in dentistry from Aleppo University in 1997. Her husband, Bakr Sidqi, is a writer and former political prisoner; they have two children.
