= Palestinian Popular Committees =

The Palestinian Popular Committees (Arabic: اللجان الشعبية الفلسطينية) was a Palestinian movement, founded in 1983. The movement emerged mainly amongst youths in the Yarmouk refugee camp in Damascus, Syria, after a split away from the Palestine Liberation Organization. The Palestinian Popular Committees were supported by the Communist Labour Party of Syria. The movement backed the Abdel-Fattah Ghanem-led splinter group of the Palestinian Liberation Front. The organization was disbanded in 1985, as a campaign of arrests was launched against the Communist Party of Labour in Syria.
