= Samir Kuntar =

Lebanese militant

Samir Kuntar سمير القنطار
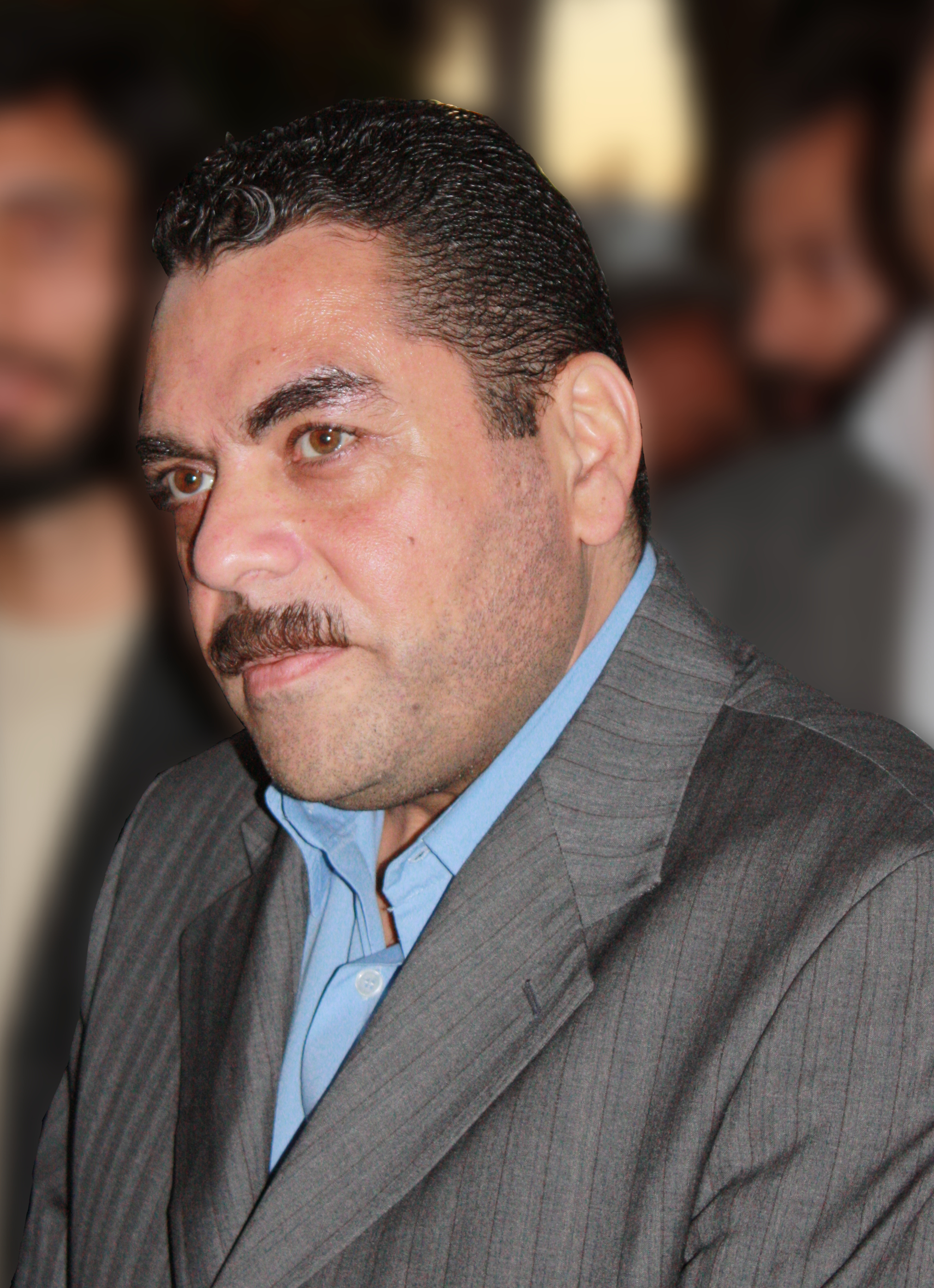
- Kuntar in 2009
- Born: 20 July 1962; Aabey, Lebanon
- Died: 19 December 2015 (aged 53); Jaramana, Syria
- Cause of death: Killed by airstrike
- Occupation: Militant
- Known for: 1979 Nahariya attack
- Movement: Palestinian Liberation Front and Hezbollah
- Criminal charge: Murder
- Criminal penalty: Five life sentences
- Spouse(s): Kifah Kayyal (divorced); Zeineb Barjawi (m. 2009)
- Military career
- Allegiance: Hezbollah
- Service years: 1978–2015
- Conflicts: Syria: Syrian Civil War; American-led intervention in Syria

Samir Kuntar (Arabic: سمير القنطار, also transcribed Sameer, Kantar, Quntar, Qantar; 20 July 1962 – 19 December 2015) was a Lebanese militant who was a member of the Palestinian Liberation Front (PLF). In 1979, he took part in the Nahariya attack in Israel, for which an Israeli court would convict him of murder and terrorism. He was eventually released as part of the 2008 Israel–Hezbollah prisoner exchange.

Samir Kuntar was born to a Druze family in Lebanon and joined Palestinian militants in Lebanon at a young age. In 1979 at the age of 16, Kuntar and three other PLF militants snuck into Nahariya, Israel, by boat. Their goal was to capture Israelis and force Israel into a prisoner exchange, but the "raid went horribly wrong". In the end, two Israeli police officers and two Israeli civilians were dead, as were two of the PLF members. Kuntar denied killing the Israeli civilians and said they had been killed by Israeli forces as they shot at him and the PLF militants. But Israeli authorities accused Kuntar of murdering two Israeli civilians, a father and his four year old daughter, in cold blood, and an Israeli court convicted Kuntar of murder. Thus, Kuntar came to be "reviled as a child-murdering monster in Israel".

After Israel's withdrawal from southern Lebanon in 2000, Hezbollah began to campaign for the release of all Lebanese citizens from Israel. Israel's refusal to release Kuntar (and other Lebanese citizens) was cited as the justification for the 2006 Hezbollah cross-border raid, which lead to the 2006 Lebanon War. After the war, Kuntar was released from prison as part of the 2008 Israel–Hezbollah prisoner exchange. His arrival in Lebanon was greeted by crowds of tens of thousands of people, as well as Lebanese Prime Minister Fuad Sinora. He continued to be celebrated, receiving Syria's highest medal, and later being honored by Iranian President Mahmoud Ahmadinejad. The US government designated him as a Specially Designated Global Terrorist. According to some sources, Kuntar took part in the Syrian Civil War.

On 19 December 2015, Kuntar was killed by an explosion in the outskirts of Damascus. According to official Syrian sources, Kuntar was killed by "terrorist rocket attack". On 20 December 2015, Syrian Information Minister Omran al-Zoubi described the incident as a terrorist operation "plotted beforehand", commenting that Syrian authorities were carrying out an investigation to find out how the operation happened. Hezbollah said that the building was destroyed by an air-to-surface missile launched by Israeli Air Force jets. On 21 December, the Free Syrian Army released a video clip claiming responsibility for killing Kuntar.

== Early life ==
Kuntar was born to a Druze family in Lebanon. His parents divorced soon after his birth and his mother died when he was a boy. The father remarried and moved to Saudi Arabia, leaving Samir in the care of his second wife, Siham, in Abey, a village southeast of Beirut. Kuntar dropped out of school at 14 and underwent training in the camps of various Palestinian militant groups and became a member of the Palestinian Liberation Front. He was motivated by anti-Zionism and his vision was to "liberate Arab territories from Israeli occupation". His goal was to take part in an attack on Israel.

== Hijacking attempt ==
On 31 January 1978, Samir Kuntar and three additional militants from his organization attempted to hijack an Israeli bus running the line between Beit She'an and Tiberias in order to demand the release of militants imprisoned in Israel. They traveled to Jordan and attempted to cross the Jordan river into Israel by swimming. However, before crossing, they were arrested by the Jordanian intelligence. Kuntar was held for 11 months in a Jordanian prison and was released in December 1978. He was banned from entering Jordan for three years.

== Raid from Southern Lebanon ==
On 22 April 1979, aged 16, Samir Kuntar led a group of four PLF militants who entered Israel from Lebanon by boat. The group members included Abdel Majeed Aslan (born 1955), Muhanna Salim al-Muayyad (born 1960) and Ahmad al-Abras (born 1949). They all belonged to the PLF under the leadership of Abu Abbas. The group departed from the Tyre seashore in Southern Lebanon using a 55-hp motorized rubber boat with an 88 km/h speed. The goal of the operation was to attack Nahariya, 10 kilometers away from the Lebanese border. They named it "Operation Nasser".

Around midnight, they arrived at the coastal town of Nahariya. The four first killed Eliyahu Shachar, a policeman who encountered them. The group then entered a building on Jabotinsky Street where they split into pairs. One group broke into the apartment of the Haran family before police reinforcements had arrived. According to Samir Kuntar's testimony, the PLF militants tried to tell Danny Haran in Arabic to leave his four year old daughter behind and come with them, but Danny appeared to speak back to them in Hebrew and English. It was unclear to them whether Danny truly didn't understand them or he was delaying to give Israeli forces the chance to arrive. When Danny refused to let go of his daughter Einat, Kuntar says he grabbed them both and hurriedly took them to the boat. Smadar Haran, Danny Haran's widow and Einat's mother, contradicted Kuntar's testimony, and denied such a conversation ever took place.

The mother, Smadar Haran, was able to hide in a crawl space above the bedroom with her 2-year-old daughter Yael, and a neighbor. Kuntar's group took Danny and Einat down to the beach, where a shoot-out with Israeli policemen and soldiers erupted. According to the Israeli authorities, when Kuntar's group found that the rubber boat they had arrived in was disabled by gunfire, Kuntar shot Danny at close range in the back, in front of his daughter, and drowned him in the sea to ensure he was dead. Next, he smashed the head of 4-year-old Einat on beach rocks and crushed her skull with the butt of his rifle.

Smadar Haran accidentally suffocated Yael to death while attempting to quiet her whimpering, which would have revealed their hiding place, from where she saw Danny and Einat being led away at gunpoint by Kuntar. During the shoot-out, a second policeman and another of Kuntar's accomplices were killed. Kuntar and the fourth member of the group, Ahmad Assad al-Abras, were injured and captured. Al-Abras was freed by Israel in the prisoner exchange of May 1985.

== Trial ==
Kuntar and al-Abras were charged with murder. During interrogation Kuntar had signed a confession accepting responsibility for the deaths of the policeman and of Danny and Einat Haran. At the trial, however, he denied killing either the father or the daughter. His defense claimed that he had been beaten in the detention center.

Kuntar explained that the group's goal had been to take hostages back to Lebanon, and that he had taken the 4-year-old to prevent Israeli police from shooting at them. According to him, Danny Haran suddenly rose up, shouting and signalling to the Israeli soldiers to stop shooting. Both of them were then hit by the soldiers' bullets, killing Haran and seriously wounding Kuntar and rendering him unconscious. He stated that he had no knowledge of the fate of the girl.

An anonymous witness for the prosecution confirmed that Haran had shouted to the soldiers "Cease your fire, don't shoot, my little girl is here," but that Kuntar then shot him in the back. An Israeli physician testified at the trial that the child was killed by "a blow from a blunt instrument, like a club or rifle butt." The pathologist's report showed that Einat's brain matter was found on Kuntar's rifle.

Both Kuntar and al-Abras were convicted of murdering five people, two policemen and three members of the Haran family. They were sentenced to five life sentences, and an additional forty-seven years for injuries inflicted. The court file containing the evidence submitted and the court proceedings was declared top secret and no one, with the exception of the pardons committee, was allowed to access the file for almost 30 years. A few days before Kuntar's expected release in the 2008 Israel–Hezbollah prisoner exchange, Yedioth Ahronoth was finally given access to Court File No. 578/79, with two notable exceptions.

At his trial, and consistently thereafter, Kuntar denied killing the 4-year-old or her father. He told his detailed version of the events to Maariv correspondent Chen Kotes-Bar. According to a former cellmate, Yasser Hanjar, al-Kuntar "never expressed remorse, but maintains a different version [of the events] than the Israeli one", that he only wanted to take the Israeli family hostage, and that he "firmly rejected allegations he had smashed the head of 4-year-old Einat Haran." After his release, al-Kuntar accused the Israeli government of fabricating the story of how he killed the child. A psychologist, Zvi Sela, served as Chief Intelligence Officer of the Israel Prison Service and met al-Kuntar in prison in this capacity. In an interview with Haaretz, he said that he believed Kuntar's version:

We turned Kuntar into God-knows-what – the murderer of Danny Haran and his daughter, Einat. The man who smashed in the girl's head. That's nonsense. A story. A fairy tale. He told me he didn't do it and I believe him. I investigated the event ... and in my opinion there is support for the fact that they were killed by fire from the Israeli rescue forces. You can accuse him all you like, but it was obviously the rescue forces that opened fire.

According to Sela, Kuntar also said that he would not go back to terrorism, if released.

== Treatment in prison ==
During his imprisonment, Kuntar married Kifah Kayyal (born in 1963), an Israeli Arab female activist on behalf of militant prisoners. The couple later divorced. While they were married, she received a monthly stipend from the Israeli government, an entitlement due to her status as a wife of a prisoner. Kayyal is an Israeli citizen of Palestinian origin from Acre, now residing in Ramallah, who was then serving a life sentence for her activities in the Palestinian Liberation Front. Kuntar was allowed conjugal visits with his wife while in prison. They had no children.

In addition, while in prison Kuntar participated in a program under which Palestinian security prisoners took correspondence courses from the Open University of Israel, and graduated with a bachelor's degree in social and political science.

== Negotiations for release ==
In October 1985, the Palestinian Liberation Front hijacked the MS Achille Lauro, an Italian cruise ship, demanding that Israel release Kuntar along with 50 Palestinian prisoners. Kuntar was the only prisoner specifically named. The hijackers killed Leon Klinghoffer, a 69 year old Jewish-American passenger, and threw his body and wheelchair overboard.

In 2003, Israel agreed to release around 400 prisoners in exchange for businessman Elchanan Tenenbaum and the bodies of three soldiers held by Hezbollah since 2000. Hezbollah leader Hassan Nasrallah refused to accept the deal unless it included Samir Kuntar. "Hezbollah's conditions have become clear and defined, and we are sticking to them in all circumstances", Nasrallah declared in his statement.

Israel then agreed to release Samir Kuntar on condition that Hezbollah provided "solid evidence" as to the fate of Ron Arad, an air force navigator missing in Lebanon since 1986.

Inspired by the prisoner swap, Hamas vowed, a few days later, that they would also abduct Israeli soldiers to secure the release of Palestinian prisoners. Hassan Nasrallah simultaneously told his supporters that Hezbollah would continue to kidnap Israelis until "not a single prisoner" remained inside Israeli jails.

In 2006, Lebanese Prime Minister Fouad Siniora and United Nations envoy Terje Rød-Larsen proposed a deal in which Kuntar and all other Lebanese prisoners would be released on condition that Syria declared Shebaa farms as Lebanese territory, the Lebanese deployed troops on the country's southern border with Israel, Israel withdrew from Shebaa farms and the Israeli air force stopped flying over Lebanon, Israeli occupation ended, though Hezbollah was not disarmed and Hezbollah was not removed from the border areas.

== Prisoner exchange deal ==
On 26 May 2008, Israeli sources announced that Samir Kuntar was among those who would be exchanged for the bodies of two reservists, Eldad Regev and Ehud Goldwasser, captured by Hezbollah in the cross-border raid that sparked the 2006 Lebanon War. On 29 June 2008, the Israeli cabinet approved the prisoner exchange between Hezbollah and Israel which would involve the release of Kuntar despite intelligence stating that the two soldiers were almost certainly dead. Kuntar and four other prisoners released as part of the deal were the last of the Lebanese prisoners in Israeli custody. Also included in the deal was the release of the remains of other Lebanese from all other previous wars and, after a suitable interval, dozens of Palestinian prisoners.

On 16 July 2008, Hezbollah transferred coffins containing the remains of captured Israeli soldiers Ehud Goldwasser and Eldad Regev, in exchange for Kuntar and four Hezbollah members taken prisoner during the 2006 Lebanon War.

== Reception in Lebanon ==
Upon Kuntar's arrival at Beirut Airport, along with four other freed Lebanese prisoners, he was officially received by the Lebanese President Michel Sleiman, Prime Minister Fuad Saniora, Speaker of the Parliament of Lebanon Nabih Berri, some Lebanese members of Parliament, and Muslim and Christian clerics.

Hezbollah arranged a public celebration in Dahieh (their stronghold in Beirut), where Hassan Nasrallah gave a welcoming speech to Kuntar.

On 17 July 2008, Kuntar visited the tomb of Imad Mughniyeh. Later that day, a homecoming function was organized in Kuntar's native village of Aabey, southeast of Beirut. The ceremony was addressed by Progressive Socialist Party leader Walid Jumblatt and the Labour Minister and Hezbollah official, Mohammad Fneish.

On 19 July 2008, Al Jazeera TV broadcast a program from Lebanon about Kuntar's welcoming festivities. In it, the head of Al Jazeera's Beirut office, Ghassan bin Jiddo, praised Kuntar, calling him a "pan-Arab hero", and organized a birthday party for him. In response, Israel's Government Press Office (GPO) threatened to boycott the satellite channel unless it apologized. A few days later, Al Jazeera's director general, Khanfar Wadah, issued a statement admitting parts of the program had violated the station's Code of Ethics, and ordered the channel's programming director to try to prevent a recurrence.

== Statements following his release ==
After his release, Kuntar made a number of statements on certain elements of the Israeli–Palestinian conflict.

In an interview to Al-Manar, Hezbollah's satellite television network, Kuntar said: "I'm jealous of the Zionists, who don't spare any effort in bringing back captured soldiers or soldiers' bodies. Seriously, we are jealous of our enemy and its care for a [body] and how it goes to the end of the world in order to return it, and of its concerns for captives and how it will go to the very edge to bring them back."

In an interview with the Agence France-Presse in October 2008, Kuntar stated that "The resistance will end only when the Zionist entity disappears." He also asserted that Israel was preparing to attack Lebanon again and that "Israel is going to suffer great losses. The idea that Israel is an invincible, secure state has become a myth."

== Post-release ==
In March 2009, he married Zeineb Barjawi, the daughter of a prominent Lebanese Shia family.

=== Travel restrictions ===
He was on the list of individuals banned from entering the United Kingdom.

=== Syrian Civil War ===
Syrian government sources stated that Samir Kuntar had played an important role in the Syrian part of the Golan Heights by Hezbollah, with a special emphasis on Druze villages.

In July 2015, it was claimed that Kuntar was targeted and possibly killed in an alleged Israeli drone strike upon his automobile in the Syrian-controlled Golan Heights town of Hader, along with members of Hezbollah and the Syrian National Defence Forces.

== Death ==
On 19 December 2015, in the midst of the Syrian Civil War, Kuntar was killed by an explosion destroying a six-story residential building in Jaramana on the outskirts of Damascus. The explosion also killed eight Syrian nationals, among them Hezbollah field commanders, and injured a number of other people. According to official Syrian sources, Kuntar was killed by "rocket attack."

On 20 December, Syrian Information Minister Omran al-Zoubi described the incident as a terrorist operation "plotted beforehand," noting that Syrian authorities were carrying out an investigation to find out how the operation happened. Hezbollah stated that the building was destroyed by an air-to-surface missile launched by Israeli Air Force jets and warheads from smart bombs with Israeli markings were found in the rubble of the building. Hezbollah alleged that two Israeli jets penetrated Syrian airspace. Hezbollah vowed revenge on Israel after the attack. On the same day, three rockets were fired at northern Israel with no casualties and Israel responding with artillery fire at Lebanon. Lebanese media reported that the Popular Front for the Liberation of Palestine was responsible for the rocket fire and it might have been a symbolic response to Kuntar's assassination. On December 21, the Free Syrian Army released a video clip claiming responsibility for killing Kuntar and accusing Hezbollah of blaming Israel for propaganda purposes. However, Free Syrian Army's responsibility is considered unlikely since Kuntar was killed in precision executed strike which destroyed only part of a building without further collateral damage which would clearly exceed the Free Syrian Army's capability although they certainly had a motive due to Kuntar's cooperation with Assad. In late February 2016, a remark by Israeli politician Omer Bar-Lev was interpreted as an admission that Israel was responsible for Kuntar's assassination.

On 21 December, after a funeral service attended by thousands of Hezbollah militants, and Lebanese politicians and leaders of Palestinian factions in Lebanon, Kuntar was buried at the "Two Martyrs" cemetery in Dahieh, which is also the burial location of former senior leader of Hezbollah Imad Mughniyeh and his son Jihad.

== See also ==
- Lebanese prisoners in Israel
