= Nasim Nisr =

Nasim Nisr (also spelled Nissim Nasser; Arabic: نسيم نصر; Hebrew: נסים נסר; born 1968), is a Lebanese and former Israeli citizen who was convicted of spying for Hezbollah.

== Biography ==
Nisr was born in Lebanon in 1968 to a Muslim father and a Jewish mother who converted to Islam after her marriage. In 1982, Nisr moved to Israel and obtained Israeli citizenship under the Law of Return. He lived in Holon, and was married with two daughters. His immediate family remained behind in Lebanon.

Nisr established ties with a Hezbollah agent through his brother in Lebanon. He was asked to supply maps of Tel Aviv marking electricity and gas installations, to extract intelligence from a top Israeli military officer, and to monitor the activities of Israeli armor near Ramallah.

He was arrested in 2002, tried and convicted of spying for Hezbollah, and sentenced to six years in prison in a plea bargain. During his imprisonment, he gave up his Israeli citizenship, hoping to be included in a prisoner exchange deal. His release in a prisoner exchange was a Hezbollah demand during the 2006 Lebanon War, which Israel refused. However, on 1 June 2008, he was deported to Lebanon as part of a prisoner exchange for the remains of two Israeli soldiers killed during the war.

== See also ==
- 2008 Israel-Hezbollah prisoner swap
