= Muhammad Zaidan =

Founder and leader of the Palestinian Liberation Front (1948–2004)

- Born: Muhammad Zaidan; 1948; Disputed (see Early life)
- Died: 8 March 2004 (aged 55–56); Iraq (in United States custody)
- Resting place: Martyrs' Cemetery; Yarmouk Camp, Damascus, Syria
- Other names: Abu Abbas, Abul Abbas, Muhammad Abbas
- Organization: Palestinian Liberation Front
- Known for: Founding and leading the Palestinian Liberation Front
- Criminal penalty: Life imprisonment in absentia (Italy, 1986)
- Spouse: Reem Nimr
- Children: 3

Muhammad Zaidan (1948 – 8 March 2004), also known as Muhammad Abbas and by the nom de guerre Abu Abbas (Arabic: أبو عباس Abū ʿAbbās, /ˈɑːbuː əˈbɑːs/ AH-boo ə-BAHSS), was a Palestinian militant who founded the Palestinian Liberation Front (PLF) with Tal'at Ya'qub and led the group from 1977 until his death. He planned the 1985 hijacking of the Italian cruise ship Achille Lauro, during which the American passenger Leon Klinghoffer was killed. He was a member of the Executive Committee of the Palestine Liberation Organization (PLO) from 1984 to 1991. An Italian court convicted him in absentia in 1986 and sentenced him to life imprisonment, but he never served any time.

Zaidan lived in Baghdad from 1994 under the protection of Saddam Hussein. United States forces captured him in Baghdad in April 2003 during the invasion of Iraq, and he died in their custody in March 2004.

== Early life ==
Accounts of Zaidan's birthplace differ, and the Encyclopedia of Middle East Wars states that he was born in 1948 in Safed. The Jewish Telegraphic Agency described him as born in Haifa. Other accounts state that he was born in a refugee camp in Syria. The Associated Press reported that his family had fled its home near Haifa when the State of Israel was created.

In 2003, the Associated Press reported that his exact age was not known and estimated it as between 55 and 62. The Pentagon gave his age as 55 at the time of his death. According to the Associated Press, he joined the Palestine Liberation Organization (PLO) in 1964 as one of its youngest recruits.

== Palestinian Liberation Front ==
Zaidan founded the Palestinian Liberation Front (PLF) together with Tal'at Ya'qub. According to the United States Department of State, the PLF splintered from the Popular Front for the Liberation of Palestine – General Command (PFLP-GC) in the late 1970s. The National Counterterrorism Center dates the break to 1977 and lists Zaidan as the group's leader from 1977 to 2004. By 1984, the PLF had split into three factions, all of which used the PLF name under different leaders. The State Department describes them as pro-PLO, pro-Syrian and pro-Libyan factions, with Zaidan leading the pro-PLO faction. His faction operated from Tunisia until October 1985 and then moved to Iraq.

On 22 April 1979, Samir Kuntar, a Lebanese Druze who acted on behalf of the PLF, took part in a night-time attack on Nahariya in Israel. The attackers killed a policeman and took Danny Haran and his four-year-old daughter to the beach, where both were killed. Haran's wife, Smadar Haran, hid in a crawl space with their two-year-old daughter, who was accidentally smothered as her mother tried to quiet her cries. In 1981, Zaidan planned two unsuccessful aerial attacks on Israel, one using a motorized hang glider and the other a hot-air balloon.

Zaidan joined the PLO Executive Committee in 1984 and remained a member until 1991.

== Achille Lauro hijacking ==
The Italian cruise ship Achille Lauro left Genoa on 3 October 1985 for a 12-day cruise of the Mediterranean Sea. On 7 October, four Palestinian militants seized the ship and demanded that Israel release 50 Palestinian prisoners. Syria refused to allow the ship to dock, and Cyprus also denied it port. On 8 October, the hijackers shot Leon Klinghoffer, a 69-year-old American Jewish passenger who used a wheelchair, and threw his body overboard.

In exchange for releasing the hostages, the hijackers demanded safe passage through Egypt and immunity from prosecution, and Egypt agreed. The four men then left the ship at Port Said. On 10 October, on the orders of President Ronald Reagan, US fighter jets intercepted the plane carrying the hijackers and forced it to land at a NATO air base at Sigonella in Sicily. Italian authorities arrested the hijackers but refused to detain Zaidan, saying that the evidence compiled by the United States was insufficient. He held an Iraqi diplomatic passport and left Italy within two days for Yugoslavia. The private journals of the PLO chairman Yasser Arafat, published by the Italian magazine L'Espresso in 2018, state that the foreign minister Giulio Andreotti allowed Zaidan to escape at Arafat's request.

Israeli intelligence later confirmed that Zaidan had directed the hijacking by radio, and he later admitted his role. He said that the ship had been seized to draw the world's attention to Israeli persecution of the Palestinians.

=== Prosecution ===
In 1986, the hijackers were tried in Italy with 11 accomplices, nine of whom, including Zaidan, were tried in absentia, or without being present. The three eldest hijackers received prison sentences of 15 to 30 years. In June 1986, Zaidan was convicted and sentenced to life imprisonment. Later news reports described the sentence as five life terms. He never served any part of the sentence.

After the hijacking, the United States issued a warrant for Zaidan's arrest and offered a $250,000 reward for his capture. The Justice Department lifted the warrant in 1988, after his conviction in Italy. By 2003, US indictments against him for piracy, hostage-taking and conspiracy had apparently expired, although CNN reported that they could be renewed.

== Later activities ==
=== Iraq and the 1990 raid ===
After the hijacking, Zaidan lived at various times in Tunisia, Libya and the Gaza Strip, and from 1994 in Baghdad under the protection of the Iraqi president Saddam Hussein.

On 30 May 1990, Israeli forces stopped an attempted seaborne attack by the PLF on the beachfront at Tel Aviv, killing four of the attackers and capturing 12. The State Department said that the PLF carried out the raid with substantial help from Libya. The PLO refused US calls to condemn the attack, distance itself from the PLF and discipline Zaidan. The United States also asked the PLO to remove him from its Executive Committee, which the PLO refused to do. In June 1990, President George H. W. Bush suspended the 18-month-old dialogue between the United States and the PLO.

During the Gulf crisis later that year, the PLF was among the Palestinian groups that threatened attacks on Western, Israeli and moderate Arab targets. Algeria allowed representatives of the PLF to appear on national television to rally support for Iraq.

=== Return to Gaza and apology ===
In April 1996, Israel allowed Zaidan and several other exiles to enter the Gaza Strip to attend a session of the Palestinian National Council (PNC), and he crossed from Egypt through the Rafah Border Crossing. In interviews, he said that he was sorry and called the hijacking "a mistake", adding that "there were no orders to kill civilians". Smadar Haran dismissed the apology, telling Israel Radio that "being sorry won't bring back the people who died".

He told The Washington Post that Klinghoffer "was not killed because he was an American or Jew". Members of the United States Congress called for his arrest and extradition, but a Justice Department spokesman said that the United States would not request it. In a 1996 interview with CNN, he said that the time for an armed struggle for a Palestinian state was over. Agence France-Presse reported that he signed the amended PLO charter in 1996, which had dropped its calls for Israel's destruction. Radio Free Europe/Radio Liberty reported that he had received an Israeli amnesty and lived in Gaza from 1996 without being harassed.

On 8 October 1997, the State Department designated the PLF a Foreign Terrorist Organization. In 1998, Zaidan returned to attend a PNC session that voted on revoking clauses of the PLO founding charter, but he did not take part in the vote. The same year, he told The Boston Globe that Klinghoffer "created troubles" and "was inciting and provoking the other passengers", and that "the decision was made to kill him". The Israeli attorney general Elyakim Rubinstein said that Zaidan did not pose a threat to Israeli security and that it would be unreasonable to prosecute him for acts committed before 1993.

In an interview with The New York Times in November 2002, Zaidan condemned the September 11 attacks and called Osama bin Laden a terrorist. In the same interview, he denied responsibility for Klinghoffer's death. According to CBS News, his faction served as a channel for payments from Saddam Hussein to the families of Palestinian suicide bombers. United States and Israeli officials suspected that the faction coordinated about $35 million in such payments.

== Capture ==
During the US-led invasion of Iraq, after Baghdad fell to US forces in April 2003, Zaidan tried to flee to Syria. He traveled north to Mosul and on to the Syrian border, but Syrian officials recognized him and turned him away. Palestinian officials close to the PLF said that he tried twice to leave Iraq through Syria and was turned away both times. According to Fox News, Palestinian factions in Damascus tried to help him on his second attempt, but he was rebuffed again. He was also reported to have tried to escape to Iran. The Institute for Palestine Studies reported that Syria had passed information about his whereabouts to the United States.

Zaidan returned to Baghdad, where US forces located him after a tip-off. On 14 April 2003, US Special Forces captured Zaidan in a compound of three buildings on the outskirts of Baghdad. The raid also found rocket-propelled grenades and passports from Yemen and Lebanon, along with other documents. Brigadier General Vincent K. Brooks said that Zaidan "was a terrorist and he remains a terrorist". The Italian justice minister Roberto Castelli said that Italy would seek his extradition.

The Palestinian leadership called the arrest illegal and demanded his release. The Palestinian minister Saeb Erekat cited a clause in the 1995 interim agreement between the PLO and Israel, which stated that PLO members could not be arrested or tried for acts committed before September 1993. A US official said that Zaidan was not covered by the immunity clause, and an Israeli official said that the clause was "not a sweeping immunity". The PLF described the arrest as part of "the American-Zionist plans against the Palestinian leadership and the PLO". He was then held in Iraq without charge.

== Death and burial ==
Zaidan died in US custody in Iraq on 8 March 2004. The Pentagon announced his death the following day, saying that he had apparently died of natural causes and that medical efforts to revive him had failed. He was reported to have had a heart condition. The Defense Department spokesman Bryan Whitman said that an autopsy would be performed. Brigadier General Mark Kimmitt later said that the autopsy had found that he died of natural causes, and rejected claims that the United States had killed him.

=== Reactions ===
His widow, Reem Nimr, accused the Americans of killing him because he had died in their custody. Nazim Yusuf, a PLF official in Lebanon, claimed that the detention center had stopped giving him medicine for ten days. The PLF spokesman Wasel Abu Yousif said that the group held the US administration responsible for his death. The PLO representative in Iraq called for an international inquiry into the cause of death. Arafat and the Palestinian leadership described him as "an exceptional combatant and nationalist chief who devoted his life to serving his people and homeland".

Raanan Gissin, an adviser to the Israeli prime minister Ariel Sharon, said that "poetic justice was done". Klinghoffer's daughters, Ilsa and Lisa, said that they had been denied justice, but that "the one consolation for us is that Abu Abbas died in captivity, not as a free man".

=== Burial and succession ===
A Palestinian cabinet minister said that the United States had agreed to hand over the body for burial in Ramallah in the West Bank. An Israeli official said that Sharon's cabinet would turn down such a request. Under a 1993 interim agreement, the Palestinians needed Israeli permission to transfer bodies for burial in the West Bank and the Gaza Strip. On 15 March 2004, after Israel's refusal, Syria agreed to his burial in the martyrs' cemetery at Yarmouk Camp outside Damascus after his body was transferred by the Red Cross.

In April 2004, the PLF appointed Omar Shibli, also known as Abu Ahmed, as its secretary-general in succession to Zaidan.

== Personal life ==
Zaidan and his wife Reem Nimr had three sons.
