= Ehud Goldwasser =

Israeli soldier taken hostage (1975–2006)

- אהוד גולדווסר
- Born: 18 July 1975; Nahariya, Israel
- Died: 12 July 2006 (aged 30); Israel–Lebanon border
- Military career
- Allegiance: Israel
- Branch: Israel Defense Forces
- Service years: 1993 – 2006
- Rank: Sergeant major
- Conflicts: 2006 Lebanon War; 2006 Hezbollah cross-border raid †

Ehud "Udi" Goldwasser (Hebrew: אהוד גולדווסר; 18 July 1975 – 12 July 2006) was an Israeli soldier who was abducted in Israel by Hezbollah along with Eldad Regev on 12 July 2006, sparking the 2006 Lebanon War. His rank was First Sergeant.

On 16 July 2008, the bodies of Goldwasser and Regev were returned to Israel in the 2008 Israel–Hezbollah prisoner exchange. Israeli officials claimed an examination of the bodies determined that the two reservists were killed during the ambush. A Lebanese minister claimed the soldiers were killed during the Israeli bombing.

== Biography ==
Prior to his abduction at Israel's border with Lebanon, Ehud "Udi" Goldwasser lived in Nahariya. He was a graduate student at the Technion, the Israeli Institute of Technology, from which he had earlier earned an undergraduate degree in environmental engineering.

As a teenager, he lived in South Africa with his parents, Shlomo and Mickey, and two younger brothers. In 2005, he married Karnit, who would later campaign globally for his release. He was interested in environmental conservation, motorcycles, sailing and photography.

According to the United Nations, the fighting of the 2006 Hezbollah cross-border raid began at around 9 AM when Hezbollah launched rockets on Israeli towns along the Lebanese border, apparently as a diversion. A force then attacked two armored IDF Humvees patrolling the border near the Israeli village of Zar'it with anti-tank rockets, and abducted the two soldiers. An Israeli Merkava Mk. II tank was damaged by a 200 kg improvised explosive device, while attempting to give pursuit, killing all four crewmembers.

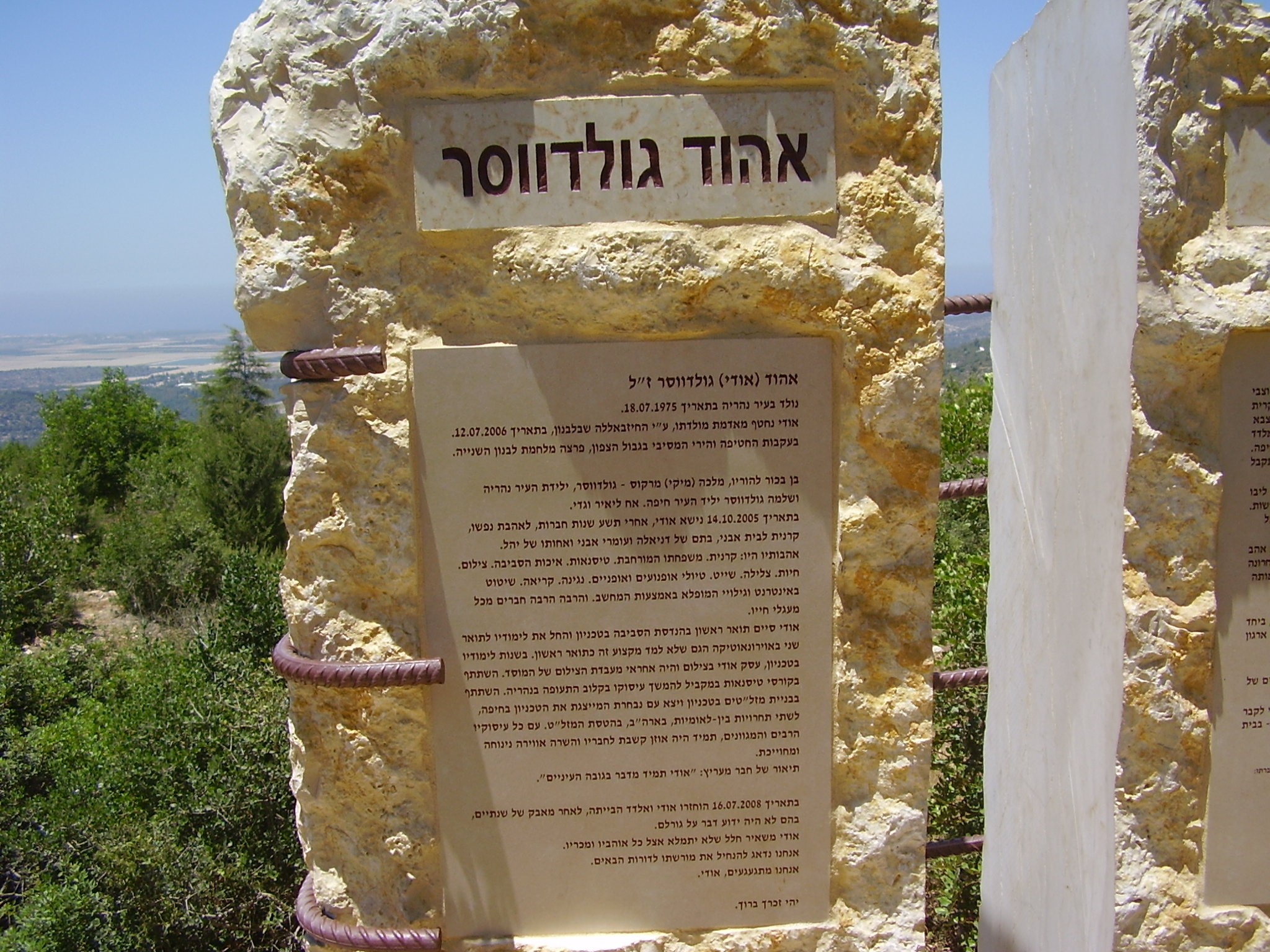
Ehud (Udi) Goldwasser memorial

In a prisoner exchange on 16 July 2008, Hezbollah transferred the coffins of Ehud Goldwasser and Eldad Regev, in exchange for Lebanese militant Samir Kuntar and four Hezbollah fighters captured by Israel during the 2006 Lebanon War, as well as the remains of 199 Lebanese and Palestinian militants.

On 19 September 2006, rock band Aerosmith dedicated their hit song "Dream On" to Goldwasser at the request of his wife.

== The abduction ==
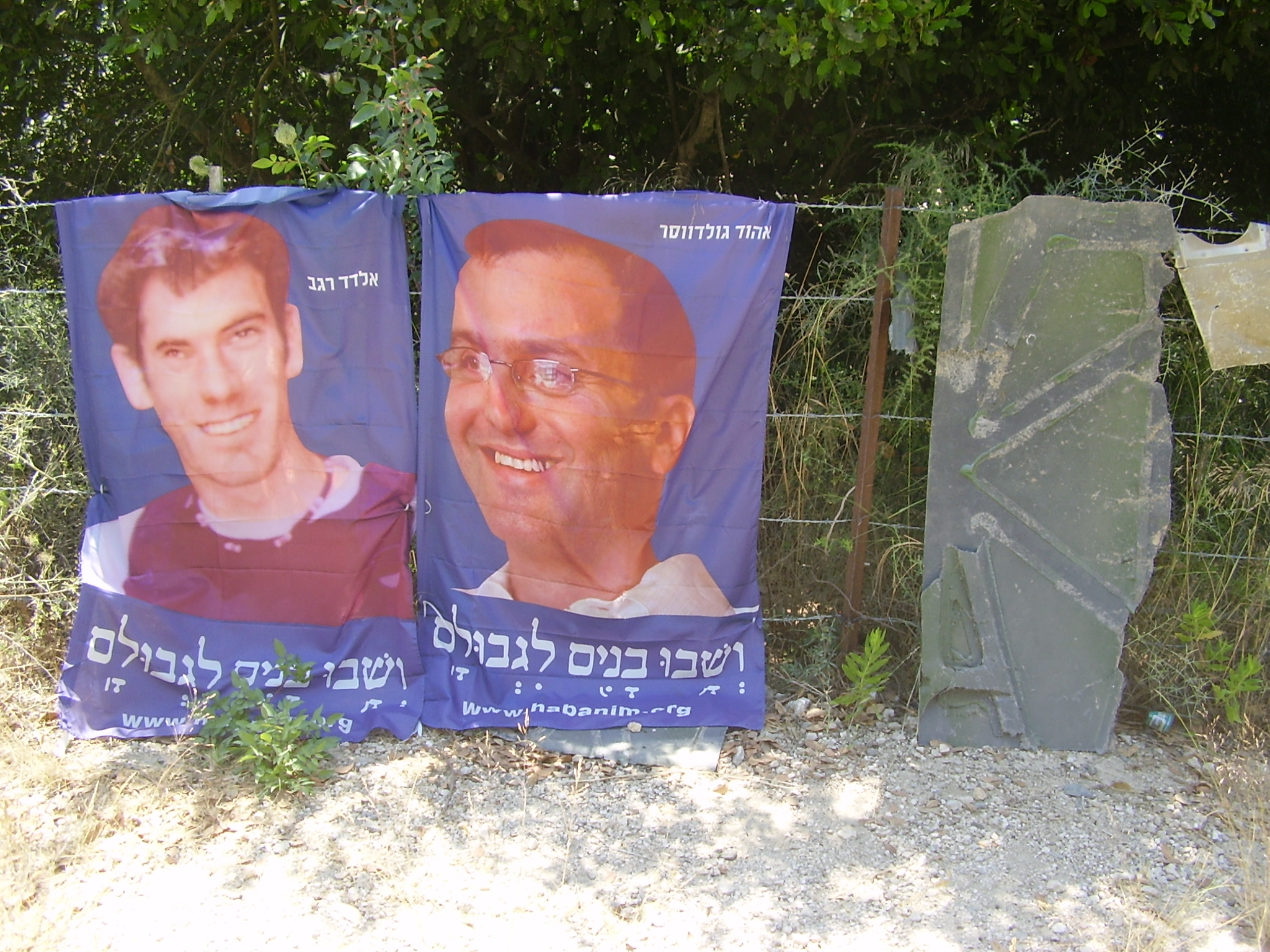
2006 Lebanon War Memorial

On the morning of 12 July 2006, at 09:05, the Hezbollah organization initiated an attack on northern Israeli settlements by firing rockets and Katyusha rockets as a diversionary action. At the same time, in the area of settlement Zar'it, near the Lebanese border (which was unoccupied), in communication line 105, at a location where Route Zar'it-Shetula crosses the border, a Hezbollah squad climbed over the border fence without being detected. The squad launched two anti-tank missiles at two IDF vehicles of the HMMWV type that were called for patrol along the border. From the first vehicle, carrying soldiers Regev and Goldwasser, two soldiers managed to extricate themselves, while one of them was seriously wounded. The Hezbollah members did not discover them. The second vehicle sustained a direct hit from an anti-tank missile, resulting in the deaths of three soldiers: Eyal Benin, Shani Turgeman, and Wasim Salah Nazal.

Shortly after that, another Hezbollah squad breached the border fence, infiltrated Israeli territory, and captured two reserve soldiers from the IDF's Division 5: Eldad Regev and Staff Sergeant Ehud Goldwasser. It is believed that both soldiers either died during the attack and abduction, or were severely injured during this time, and died due to their wounds shortly thereafter. The Hezbollah squad withdrew with the soldiers to Lebanese territory, where a vehicle was waiting near the border to swiftly transport them to a hiding place in the village of Ayta ash-Shab. Another Hezbollah squad, armed with rifles and rocket-propelled grenades, covered the kidnappers. The Lebanese newspaper "Al-Akhbar" provided detailed descriptions of the extensive preparations and execution of the abduction.

The event took place on a low Wadi, not visible from IDF positions, and therefore it took about 45 minutes to the IDF to discover the abduction. The IDF then declared the "Hannibal Directive". In response, an IDF tank from the 82nd Battalion and an armored personnel carrier were sent to Lebanon approximately an hour later to locate the captives. The tank was carrying a half-ton explosive charge, and all four crew members were killed. Later on, another soldier from the 50th Battalion was killed by a mortar shell.

== Captives exchange and burial in Israel ==
On 29 June 2008, the Israeli government approved by a majority of 22 to 3 the exchange deal. The deal was achieved with the assistance of Ofer Dekel.

According to the agreement, the convicted murderer Samir Kuntar, 4 additional prisoners, and around 199 bodies of Hezbollah militants that were temporarily buried in Israel were released. In return, Israel received from Hezbollah the two abducted soldiers (Eldad Regev and Ehud Goldwasser). Until the moment of executing the agreement itself, Israel did not receive explicit information regarding whether they are alive or dead.

The third and final stage of the agreement is defined as a gesture to the Palestinian people, in which approximately 5 Palestinian prisoners were released. The identity of the prisoners is determined by the State of Israel.

On 17 July 2008, one day after the execution of the agreement, the soldiers Ehud Goldwasser and Eldad Regev were buried. In Lebanon, celebrations of joy took place, and a holiday was declared . (This reference does not support this text and the current sentence and previous sentence imply that 'celebrations of joy' took place in Lebanon as the IDF soldiers were buried which is misleading) Thousands of people participated in their funerals. Ehud Goldwasser was buried in the military cemetery in Nahariya, and Eldad Regev was buried in the military cemetery in Haifa. They were both posthumously promoted. On 6 August, several more prisoners were released.

== See also ==
- Eldad Regev
- Gilad Shalit
- Israeli MIAs
