= Communist Labour Party (Syria) =

Communist Labour Party حزب العمل الشيوعي
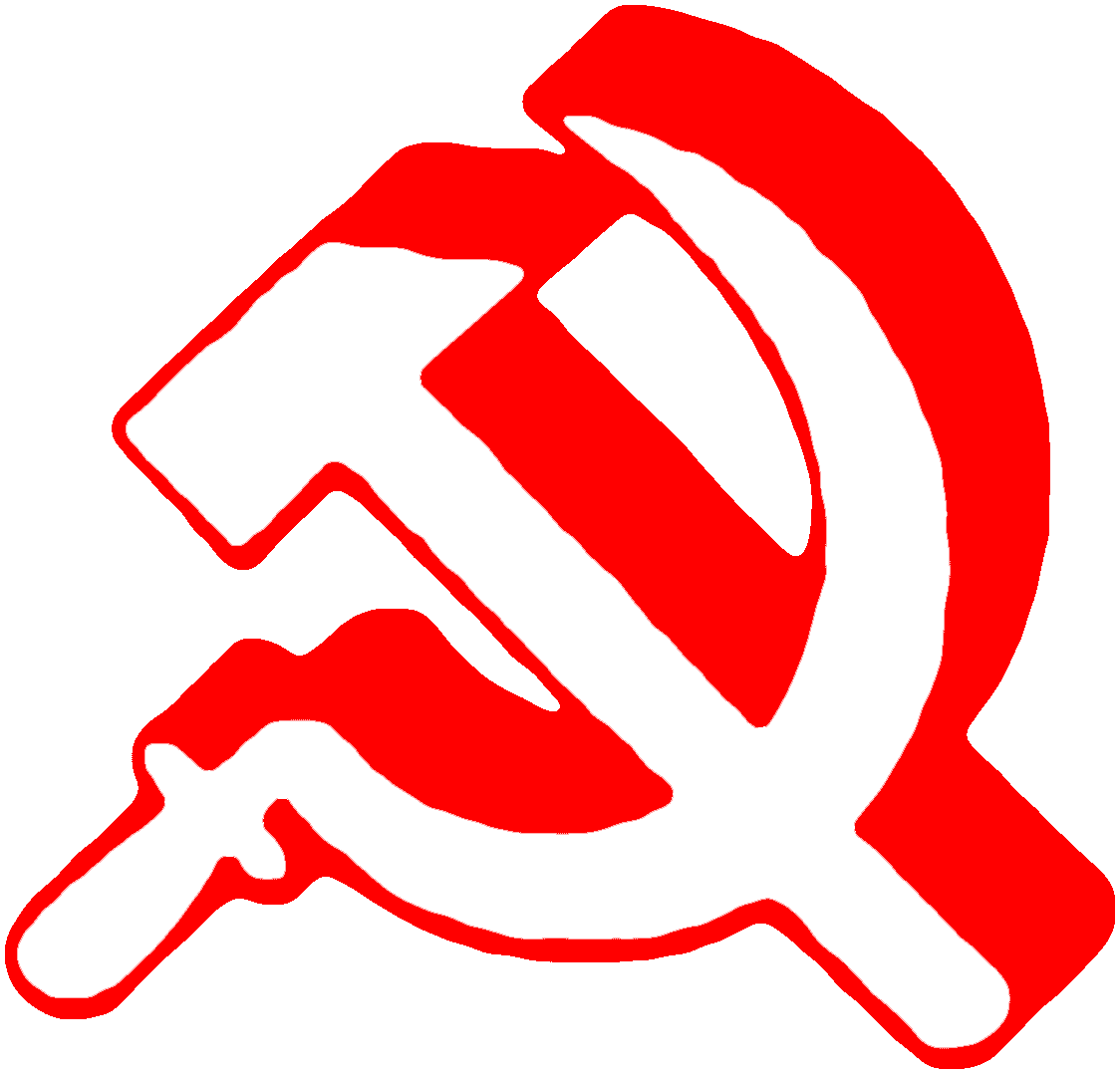
- Leader: Fateh Jamous
- Founded: 1976
- Ideology: Communism; Marxism–Leninism
- Political position: Far-left
- National affiliation: National Coordination Committee for Democratic Change; National Democratic Rally; Marxist Left Gathering
- People's Assembly of Syria: 0 / 250

The Communist Labour Party (Arabic: حزب العمل الشيوعي Hizb Al-'Amal Al-Shuyu'iy) is a Syrian communist party active in the 1980s and early 1990s.

== History ==
The party, a Marxist–Leninist splinter group from the Syrian Communist Party, was first formed in August 1976 as the League for Communist Action, and was renamed to the Syrian Communist Action Party on 6 August 1981.The party, banned by the Ba'athist government since its establishment, was victim to a number of crackdowns, where 200 of its members were arrested in 1986 alone. 21 members were sentenced by the Supreme State Security Court for "membership in a secret organization created to change the economic or social structure of the state". Amnesty International protested on behalf of the prisoners. The party continued to secretly distribute its publications–ar-Raya al-Hamra'a ("The Red Banner"), ash-Shyu'i ("The Communist"), al-Brulitari ("The Proletarian")–until 1991. On 6 August 2003, the party announced its return to the political scene in a statement, followed by a new publication called al-An ("Now").

The party is led by Fateh Jamous, who was imprisoned between 1982 and 2000. He was again arrested in 2006.

The party worked with a Palestinian dissident group, called the Palestinian Popular Committees, in the Yarmouk refugee camp in Damascus. The group was founded in 1983. The Palestinian Popular Committees were disbanded in 1985, as a campaign of arrests was launched against the Syrian party.

One of the sentenced activists of the party, Tuhama Mahmoud Ma'rouf, received a suspended sentence in 1995, only to be rearrested and ordered to begin serving her sentence in 2010 for unknown reasons. In February 2011, she began a hunger strike protesting the conditions of her detainment at Adra prison. She was released on 20 June of that year in a mass presidential amnesty for political dissidents.

=== Syrian civil war ===
From the beginning of the Syrian civil war, the party has aligned itself with the Syrian opposition, operating within its territory and political system.

In early 2018, the party condemned the Turkish military operation in Afrin.
