= Palestinian Liberation Front =

Palestinian political faction

Palestinian Liberation Front جبهة التحرير الفلسطينية
- Leader: Wasel Abu Yousef
- Founded: 1959
- Headquarters: Ramallah, Palestine
- Ideology: Ba'athism; Secularism; Arab socialism Palestinian nationalism
- Political position: Left-wing to far-left
- National affiliation: PLO

Website
- https://www.plo.ps/ar/Category/119

The Palestinian Liberation Front (Arabic: جبهة التحرير الفلسطينية, PLF), sometimes referred to in English as the Palestine Liberation Front - Abu Abbas Faction or Palestine Liberation Front, is a minor left-wing Palestinian political faction. It carried out the Achille Lauro hijacking in 1985, among other attacks that killed civilians, and is proscribed in several countries as a terrorist organisation.

In 1996, the party took part in the 1996 Palestinian general election, winning 0.11% of the vote. The party also ran in the 2006 Palestinian legislative election under the name ‘Martyr Abu Abbas’, and received 0.30% of the vote.

Leaders of the PLF throughout its history have included Ahmed Jibril, Muhammad Zaidan (Abu Abbas), Talaat Yaqoub, and the current leader, Wasel Abu Yousef.

It is not to be confused with the Palestine Liberation Front, a separate organisation with a similar name, founded by Shafiq al-Hout, Ibrahim Abu Lughod, Khaled al-Yashruti, Samira Azzam and others in Beirut in 1961 or 1963.

== History ==
=== Origins ===
The PLF was founded by Ahmad Jibril in 1959 and enjoyed strong support from Syria. In 1967, the PLF joined forces with two other groups, the ‘Heroes of the Return’, linked to the Arab nationalist movement (abtal al-awda) and the group ‘’‘The Youth of the Years’‘’ to form the Popular Front for the Liberation of Palestine (PFLP) in November 1967. In this context, the PLF was described as a ‘’Syrian puppet‘’. The PFLP was said to have emerged from an Egyptian-sponsored programme designed to weaken other Arab governments and thereby strengthen the reputation of Egyptian President Nasser.

The PFLP was led by former Arab-nationalist movement leader George Habash, but in April 1968 Ahmad Jibril split from this group to form the Popular Front for the Liberation of Palestine – General Command (PFLP-GC), which returned to the strongly pro-Syrian position of the earlier PLF.

Ultimately, this led to the re-emergence of the PLF after the organisation had broken up when Jibril's PFLP-GC followed Syria into the fight against the Palestine Liberation Organization (PLO) during the Lebanese Civil War. Open fighting broke out between the rival factions, and relations only stabilised after mediation by Yasser Arafat. On 24 April 1977, the new PLF was formed under the leadership of Muhammad Zaidan, aka Abu Abbas, and Tal'at Ya'akub. Sporadic fighting between the PFLP-GC and the PLF continued, and a bomb attack on the PLF headquarters in August 1977 killed more than 175 people, including 37 PLF members. A meeting of the PLF executive committee had adjourned unexpectedly an hour earlier.

In November 1977, the Greek Catholic Archbishop of Jerusalem, Hilarion Capucci, was released from Israeli custody after three years. He was imprisoned for three years for arms smuggling for the Fatah. He also made propaganda for the PLF. The Vatican worked for his pardon.

=== Split 1982 ===
In 1982, the Israeli invasion of Lebanon led to the organisation's split into three factions. One of the main points of contention was the relationship with the PLO and Fatah, with some members critically supporting Arafat, while others participated in the rebellion against him. All three factions claimed to represent the original organisation and retained the name PLF.

- The group led by Tal'at Ya'akub, the PLF's secretary-general, remained neutral in the fighting between the various organisations and regrouped in Lebanon. Ya'akub died of a heart attack in November 1988 and his group disintegrated.
- A smaller group under PLF Central Committee member Abd al-Fatah Ghanim was more aggressively pro-Syrian and took control of the movement in Damascus. It supported Abu Musa's Fatah-backed insurgency and cooperated with it in attacking the PLO. The group later based its administration in Libya and ultimately merged with the Ya'akub faction.
- The pro-Iraq faction under Abu Abbas, who had been deputy secretary-general, had the largest following, estimated at around 400 activists. The group had its headquarters in Tunisia, but after the hijacking of the cruise ship Achille Lauro in 1985, Abu Abbas was expelled by the Tunisian authorities and the group moved to Baghdad.

While each faction retained the original name and claimed to be the parent organisation, Abbas' group was responsible for the most high-profile terrorist attacks and it is only his faction that has been designated as terrorist.

=== Developments after the split ===
In 1991, security circles suspected that Iraqi President Saddam Hussein supported both Fatah - Revolutionary Council and the PLF. Both groups were considered ‘highly dangerous’. Intelligence agencies assumed that their leaders had been in Baghdad since the outbreak of the Iraq war, although they were said to have been at odds with Hussein for years. According to the German domestic intelligence service, both combat units were represented in Germany by about twelve members. At the time, Saddam Hussein was considered to have the ability to influence violent Palestinians. In addition to Abu Nidal and the PLF, the 1st of May organisation is also said to have operated from Baghdad; the city was considered ‘the secret PLO headquarters’. In mid-January 1991, Arafat is said to have stayed there, although he had had a feud with Abu Nidal for a long time. This discord among the PLO leadership was seen as a ‘vacuum at the top of the PLO’. Iraq had also provided refuge for ten years to one of the perpetrators of the first attack on the World Trade Center in 1993, Sheikh Ahmed Jassin. Baghdad has repeatedly allowed terrorists to go underground.

In 1993, the following people were among Yasser Arafat's most important opponents in the PLO:

- Georges Habash, PFLP Palestine Liberation Front, based in Damascus, approx. 2000 fighters;
- Naif Hawatmeh, DFLP Democratic Front for the Liberation of Palestine, based in Damascus, approx. 1500 fighters;
- Ahmed Jibril, PFLP-GC Popular Front for the Liberation of Palestine – General Command, based in Damascus, approx. 300 fighters;
- Abu Abbas, PLF Palestinian Liberation Front, based in Baghdad, approx. 500 fighters.

Nevertheless, the leaders of the PLF still worked with the PLO, with Abu Abbas sitting on the PLO's Executive Committee as the PLF's representative. After the PLO signed the Oslo Agreement in 1994, which the PLF rejected, Abu Abbas turned away from terrorism and argued for the right of Israel to exist. The movement continued to maintain offices in the Palestinian territories, Lebanon and Iraq, but its activities have since diminished. In the West Bank and Gaza Strip, the PLF enjoys less popular support, with its main following drawn from the Lebanese refugee camps, where it reportedly sides with Fatah against various Syrian-backed groups.

=== Developments since 2000 ===
In November 2001, 15 members of a PLF cell were arrested by Israeli authorities. Some of these prisoners had received terrorist training in Iraq. The cell had planned attacks in Jerusalem, Tel Aviv and Ben Gurion Airport. In addition, it had already been involved in other terrorist activities, including the kidnapping and murder of the Israeli teenager Yuri Gushstein.

During the US-led Iraq War, Abu Abbas was captured by US special forces in April 2003 after intelligence tips in a suburb of the Iraqi capital Baghdad. He may have tried to escape to Syria. Some of his associates had also been arrested in Baghdad. The US State Department had previously indicated that the Iraqi regime had supported the PLF. The Palestinian government demanded the release of Abu Abbas. The reason for this demand was that his arrest violated the 1995 Middle East Agreement. This stipulates that acts committed before the 1993 Oslo Peace Agreement may not lead to prosecution.

According to reports, Abu Abbas died in US captivity on 9 March 2004. Initial reports indicated a natural cause of death. Various Palestinian groups and his widow, however, spoke of murder. Abu Abbas was allegedly the mastermind behind the Achille Lauro kidnapping. The Palestinian Liberation Front participated in the Palestinian Authority elections under the name ‘Martyr Abu Abbas’, but did not win a seat.

In 2008, PLF's student wing, the Student Liberation Bloc (Arabic: كتلة التحرير الطلابية) won two seats in the elections to the student council at Al-Quds University.

=== Developments since 2010 ===
Since 2014, the armed conflicts between the Palestinian Liberation Front, Fatah, Hamas, the Abu Nidal Organization, the Popular Front for the Liberation of Palestine, Palestinian Islamic Jihad and the Arab Liberation Front have intensified as rival organisations. They engage in skirmishes for political influence in the Palestinian refugee camps in Lebanon. This split in the Palestinian representation of interests has worsened the already precarious situation for the civilian population. Their lives are characterised by unemployment and the radicalisation of young people.

Since 2016, the Palestinian Liberation Front has not claimed any attacks. It continues to maintain a military presence in refugee camps in Syria, Lebanon and Gaza.

== Terrorist activities (1979 - 2005) ==
The Palestinian Liberation Front has carried out several attacks that have included the killing of civilians. Since 1997, the PLF has been a designated terrorist organization by the United States and by Canada since 2003. The PLF has also been banned in Japan.

=== Attack on Nahariya ===
During the night of 22 April 1979, four members of the PLF went ashore from Lebanon in a rubber dinghy and forcibly entered an apartment building. They took hostages there. The 17-year-old PLF fighter Samir Kuntar is said to have killed two of his hostages on the beach when Israeli security forces approached. Two policemen died, and two of the attackers were also killed. Kuntar was imprisoned in Israel. Hezbollah repeatedly called for his release. In 2004, a prisoner exchange organised by the German Federal Intelligence Service took place. In the process, 430 Palestinians and 16 members of Hezbollah were released. Samir Kuntar was taken off the list of those released at the last moment. In December 2015, he was killed in an air strike.

=== Achille Lauro hijacking ===
One notorious incident was the hijacking of the Italian cruise ship MS Achille Lauro on 7 October 1985. The hijackers' original aim was to use the ship to slip into Israel. However, crew members discovered them cleaning weapons, and the group then seized control of the ship, murdering an elderly wheelchair-dependent Jewish New Yorker, Leon Klinghoffer.

US fighter planes later forced down the Egyptian aircraft in which Abu Abbas was escaping following a negotiated end of the hijacking, and forced it to land at a USAF base on Sigonella, Sicily. The Italians let Abbas go, but subsequently sentenced him to five life sentences in absentia. Abbas was expelled from Tunisia and established his headquarters in Baghdad, Iraq.

The United States could have brought its own charges against Abbas, although a criminal complaint filed against him in 1986 was dropped a short time later without an indictment.

=== 1990 beach raid ===
In May 1990, the PLF launched an attack on Israel's Nizanim beach, near Tel Aviv, urged on by Iraq to torpedo the moves towards a negotiated solution between the PLO and Israel. The attackers had intended to kill tourists and Israeli civilians, but this was prevented. However, the action was significant, in that the failure of Yasser Arafat to condemn this attack led to the United States backing out of the American–Palestinian dialogue that had begun in 1988. Despite Arafat's official silence on the issue, the PLF suffered heavy internal criticism within the PLO, and Abu Abbas had to step down from his seat on the executive committee.

=== Netanya Market bombing ===
In May 2002, a man got out of a taxi in the market square of Netanya – according to eyewitness reports, he was wearing an Israeli army uniform – and detonated an explosive device filled with nails. The Abu Dhabi television station reported that the radical Palestinian Liberation Front had claimed responsibility for the attack. According to the Israeli daily newspaper ‘Ha'aretz’, the radical Islamic group Hamas has also claimed responsibility for the suicide bombing.

=== Explosion at the Karni border crossing ===
In January 2005, an explosive device weighing around 130 kilograms was detonated near an Israeli military base in the Gaza Strip, at the Karni crossing on the border with Israel. Grenades were then fired at the border post, and a skirmish broke out. Five people lost their lives. The Al-Aqsa Martyrs Brigade, Hamas and the Palestinian Liberation Front claimed responsibility for the attack. They said the attack was a ‘continuation of the resistance’. Abu Abbas had renounced terrorism as early as 1994.

== Ideology ==
The Palestinian Liberation Front is considered a radical left-wing organization. Its goal is the establishment of an independent Palestinian state. The PLF is described as nationalist and secular, and aligned with Ba'athism and Arab socialism. It is part of the Political Bureau of United Action of the Revolutionary Palestinian Forces, which groups revolutionary Palestinian groups together, and also includes the Popular Front for the Liberation of Palestine, Fatah, and the Arab Liberation Front.

== Electoral performance ==
=== Legislative Council ===
Election	Votes	%	Seats	+/–	Position
1996	3,919	0.11	0 / 88	New	12th
2006 (Note: As "Martyr Abu Abbas")	3,011	0.30	0 / 132	Steady	9th

== See also ==
- Palestinian Liberation Front (Abu Nidal Ashqar wing)
- Palestinian Liberation Front (Abd ul-Fattah Ghanim wing)
