= Eldad Regev =

Israeli soldier whose capture sparked the 2006 Israel-Lebanon conflict

- אלדד רגב
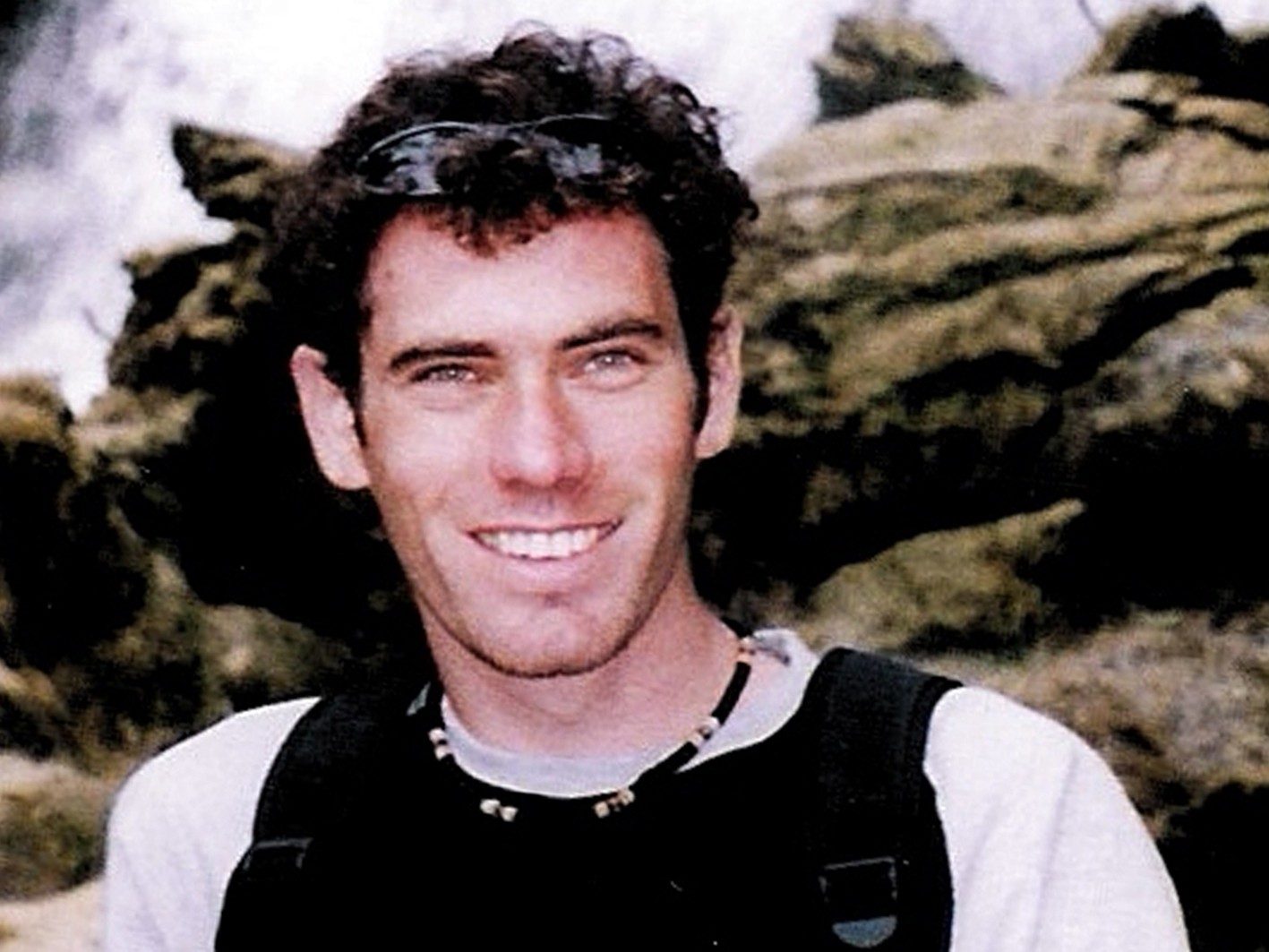
- Born: 16 August 1980; Qiryat Motzkin, Israel
- Died: 12 July 2006 (aged 25); Israeli–Lebanese border
- Known for: Being one of two Israeli soldiers whose capture sparked the 2006 Lebanon War

Eldad Regev (Hebrew: אלדד רגב; 16 August 1980 – 12 July 2006) was an Israeli soldier captured by Hezbollah fighters along with Ehud Goldwasser on 12 July 2006 in Israel near the Lebanese border, sparking the 2006 Lebanon War. His rank was Sergeant First Class.

The United Nations Security Council Resolution 1701 from 12 August 2006, among other things, called for the unconditional release of the abducted soldiers.

On 16 July 2008, coffins containing the remains of Goldwasser and Regev were returned to Israel as part of a prisoner exchange. Israeli officials claimed an examination of the bodies determined that the two reservists were killed during the ambush. A Lebanese minister claimed the soldiers were killed during the Israeli bombing.

== Biography ==
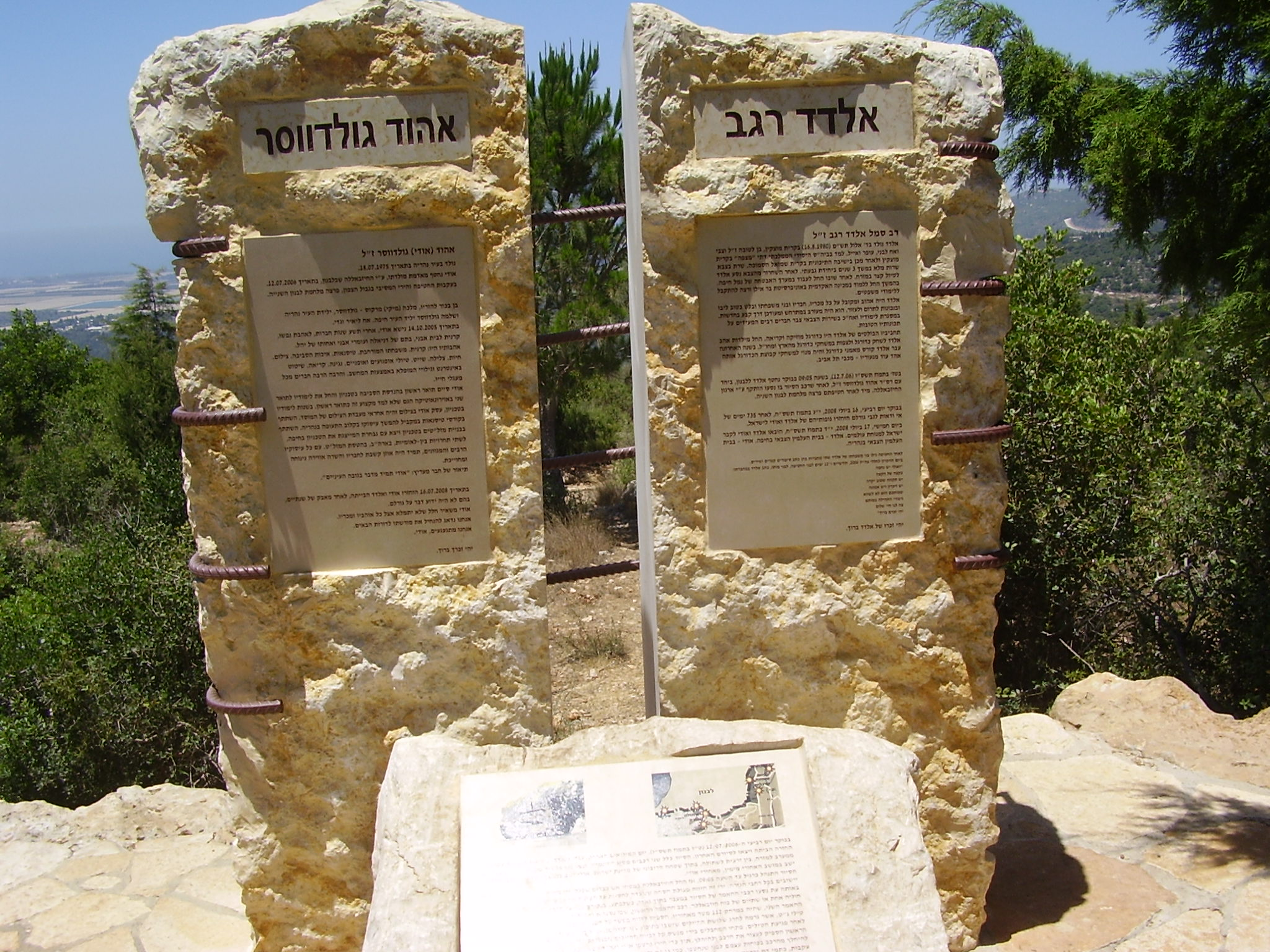
Memorial to Eldad Regev and Ehud Goldwasser in Adamit Park

Eldad was born and raised in Kiryat Motzkin. Eldad was the son of Zvi and Tova Regev, and had three brothers. He attended secondary school at the Yeshiva High School in Kiryat Shmuel, excelling in biology. His mother Tova died when he was in the 12th grade. Eldad volunteered for the infantry Givati Brigade. After his army service in the Israel Defense Forces, he traveled to the Far East.

After returning to Israel, he enrolled in a pre-academic program in preparation for his studies at the Faculty of Law at Bar-Ilan University. Two months after his abduction and towards the beginning of the academic year, the university announced that Regev had been accepted for undergraduate studies. The university president, Moshe Kaveh, even wrote to the family expressing hope that Regev would return to Israel and commence his law studies as planned.

Eldad enjoyed soccer, music and books, and played for Maccabi Neve Sha'anan Eldad F.C.

== The abduction ==
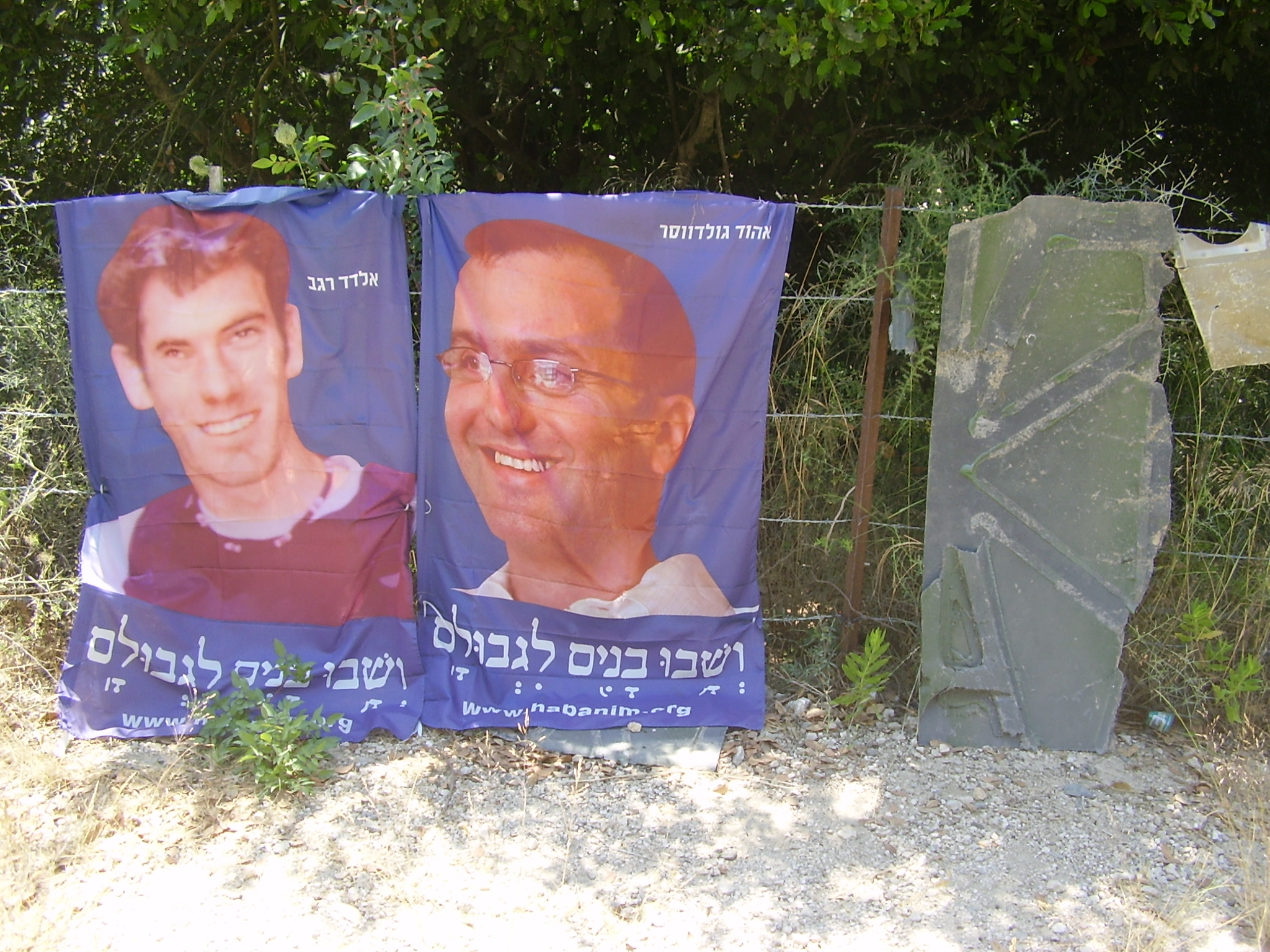
2006 Lebanon War Memorial

On the morning of 12 July 2006, at 09:05, Hezbollah initiated a rocket attack on northern Israeli communities using Katyusha and mortar shells as a diversionary tactic. At the same time, in the area of Kibbutz Zar'it near the northern Israeli border (which was unoccupied), at coordinate 105, where the Zar'it-Shetula road crosses the security fence, a Hezbollah squad infiltrated the border without detection. The squad attacked with anti-tank guided missiles two IDF military vehicles called the Achzarit that were patrolling along the border.

From the first vehicle in which Regev and Goldwasser were traveling, two soldiers managed to escape, with one of them severely injured. Hezbollah operatives did not discover them. The second vehicle sustained a direct hit by an anti-tank guided missile, resulting in the deaths of three soldiers – Eyal Benin, Shani Turgeman, and Wassim Salach Nazal. Immediately afterward, another Hezbollah squad breached the security fence, entered Israeli territory, and abducted two reserve soldiers from the IDF's 5th Division, Regev and Staff Sergeant Ehud Goldwasser, who were most probably murdered during the attack or were severely injured and succumbed shortly after.

The squad withdrew with the soldiers into Lebanese territory, where a vehicle was waiting near the fence to swiftly transfer them to a hiding place in the village of Ayta ash-Sha'b. Another armed squad, equipped with rifles and RPGs, covered the abductors. The Lebanese newspaper "Al-Akhbar" described the extensive preparations and details of the abduction.

The incident occurred in the Wadi Naim area and was not immediately detected by the IDF positions, so it took about 45 minutes to discover the abduction and declare the Hannibal Directive in response. A tank from the IDF's 82nd Battalion and an armored personnel carrier were dispatched to Lebanon about an hour later to locate the abductors. The tank was loaded with a half-ton of explosive material, and four crew members were killed. Subsequently, another soldier from the 50th Battalion's mortar unit, Sgt. Nimrod Cohen, was reportedly killed attempting to retrieve their bodies.

== Captives exchange and burial in Israel ==
On 29 June 2008, the Israeli government approved, by a majority of 22 to 3, a prisoner exchange deal, facilitated by Ofer Dekel.

The deal led to the release of Samir Kuntar, four additional prisoners, and about 199 bodies of Hezbollah members that were temporarily buried in Israel. In return, Israel would receive from Hezbollah the two abducted soldiers (Eldad Regev and Ehud Goldwasser). Until the actual implementation of the agreement, Israel would not receive explicit information on whether they were alive or dead.

The third and final phase of the agreement was designated as a tribute to the Palestinian people, during which approximately 5 Palestinian prisoners were released. The identity of the prisoners was determined by the State of Israel.

On 17 July 2008, one day after the completion of the exchange, the bodies of the soldiers Ehud Goldwasser and Eldad Regev were brought for burial. Meanwhile, in Lebanon, festive celebrations took place, and a day of celebration was declared. Numerous people participated in the funerals of the two soldiers. Ehud Goldwasser was buried in the military cemetery in Nahariya, and Eldad Regev was buried in the military cemetery in Haifa. After the return of their remains, Regev and Goldwasser had their ranks raised. On 6 August, several more prisoners were released.

== Commemoration ==
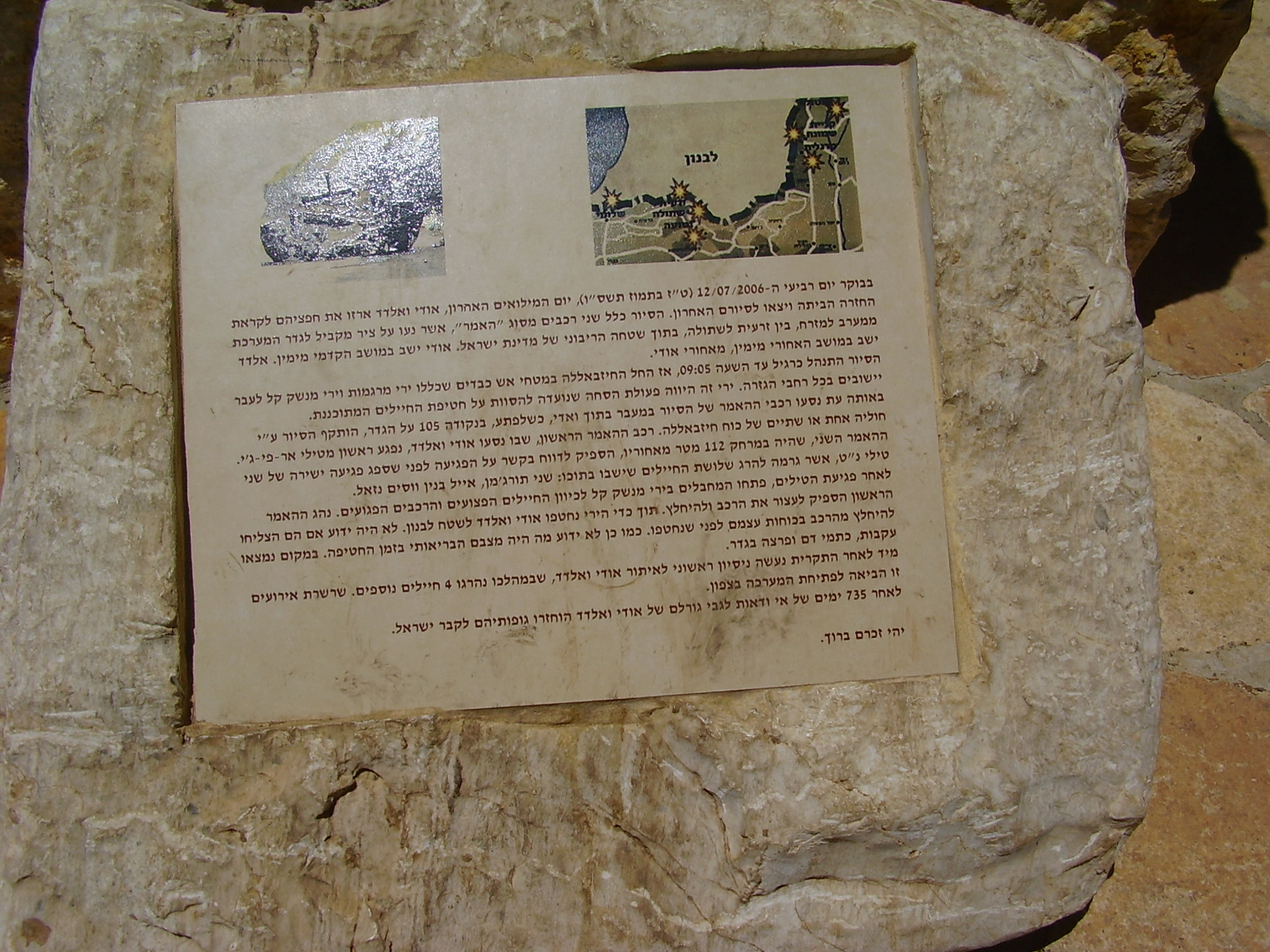
Regev & Goldwasser Memorial in Idmit Park

After Regev's death, the song "Yadat SheZe Zmani" (You Knew It Was Temporary), which he wrote, was found in his room. As part of the Israel Defense Forces' project called "Soon It Will Turn into a Song" from 2009, the music was composed by Doron Medalie, and Eyal Golan volunteered to perform it.

== See also ==
- Ehud Goldwasser
- Gilad Shalit
- Israeli MIAs
