= Ofer Dekel =

Israeli politician and negotiator (born 1951)

- עופר דקל
- Born: 1951 (age 74–75); Israel
- Education: LLB in Law; BSc in Chemistry and Physics
- Occupations: Politician; negotiator; security consultant
- Known for: Deputy director of the Israel Security Agency (Shin Bet); Negotiator for the release of missing and captive Israeli soldiers
- Military career
- Allegiance: Israel
- Branch: Shin Bet
- Service years: 1995–2005
- Rank: Deputy Director
- Conflicts: Counter terrorism and counter espionage operations; Second Intifada
- Other work: Owner and CEO of Argentum Ltd., a security consulting company

Ofer Dekel (Hebrew: עופר דקל) is an Israeli politician and negotiator. He holds an LLB degree in Law and a BSC in Chemistry and Physics.

From 1995–1996, he was head of Training Division of the Israel Security Agency (ISA) also known as Shin Bet. From 1996 to 2000, Dekel was an ISA division head for planning and commanding special operations in counter terrorism and counter espionage. From 2003–2005, he was the Deputy Director of ISA, commanding and managing counter terrorism operations. From 2000-2003, he was the head of the West-bank Division, known as Central Command. This included counter terrorism activity in Jerusalem and the Israeli-occupied West Bank from the beginning of the Second Intifada.

He is a close associate of former Israeli Prime Minister Ehud Olmert.

From August 2006 until he resigned in April 2009, Ofer Dekel was the emissary in charge of attempting to secure the release of missing and captive Israeli soldiers.

He is also the Owner and CEO of Argentum, Ltd. a security consulting company.
