= 2008 Israel–Hezbollah prisoner exchange =

Event during Israel-Lebanon hostilities

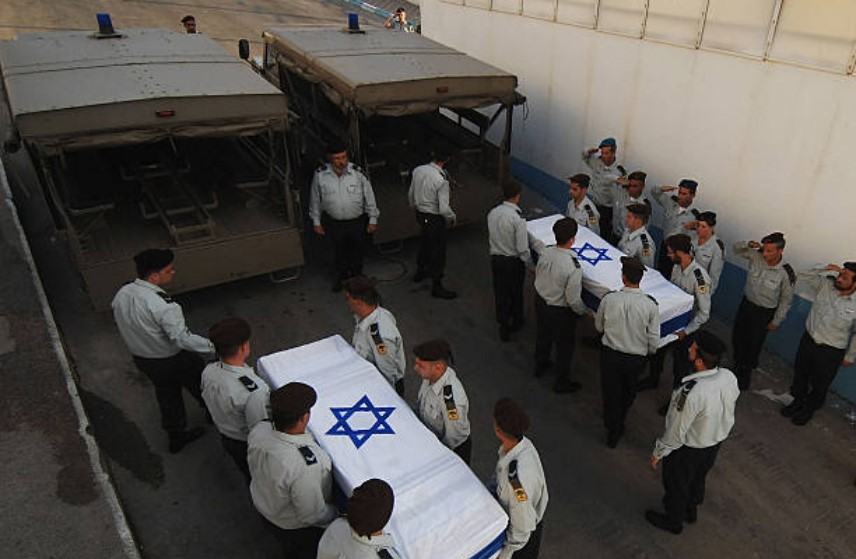
Israel–Hezbollah prisoner exchange

On 16 July 2008, Hezbollah transferred the coffins of two Israeli soldiers in exchange for 5 Lebanese militants held by Israel as well as the bodies of 199 militants captured in Lebanon or Israel.

== Exchange ==
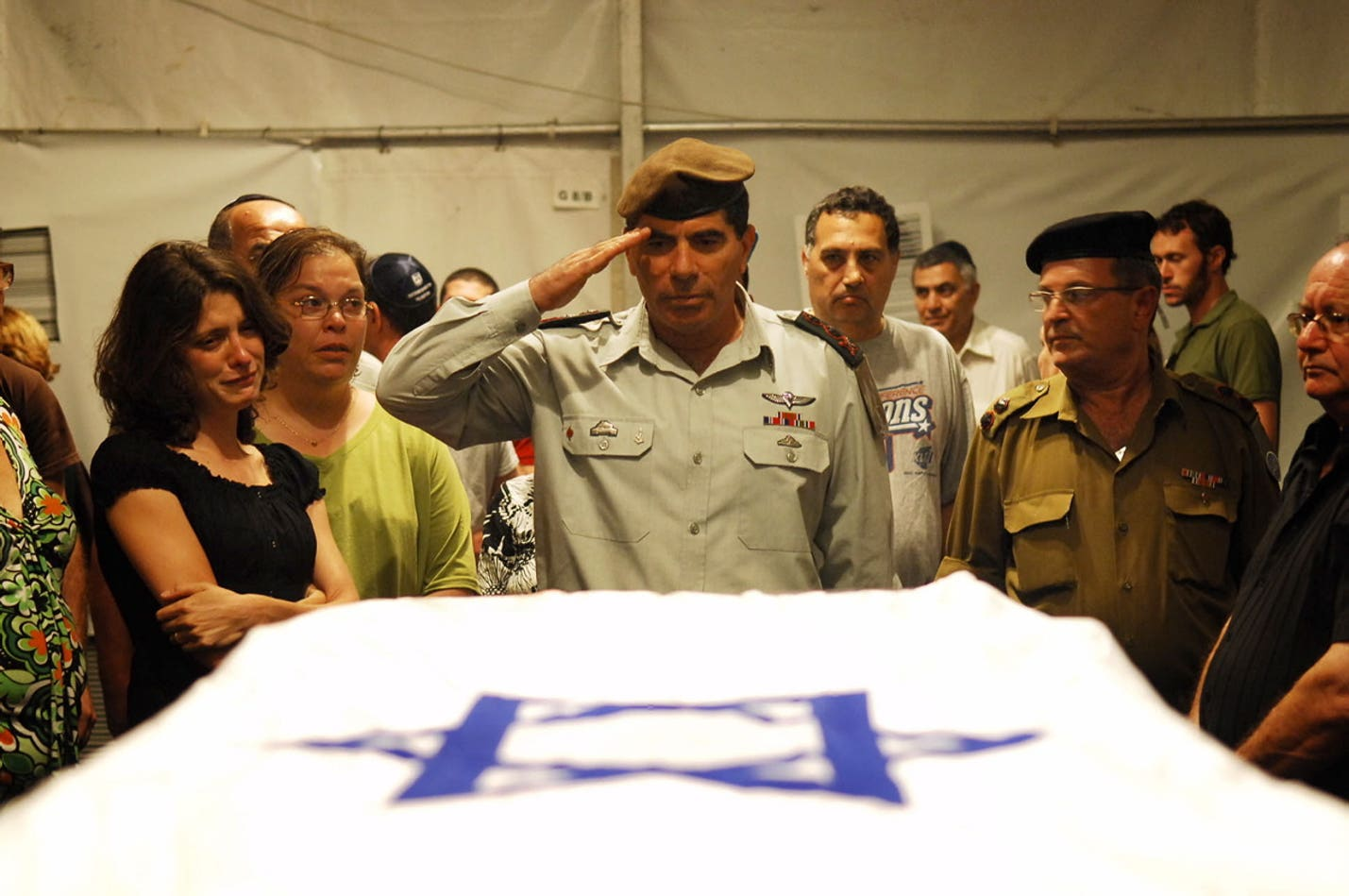
Lt. Gen. Gabi Ashkenazi saluting the coffin of Ehud Goldwasser

Hezbollah released the remains of two captured Israeli soldiers Ehud Goldwasser and Eldad Regev. In exchange, Israel returned Palestinian Liberation Front militant Samir Kuntar, who was convicted of multiple murders in Israel, Nasim Nisr, a man of Jewish heritage who had immigrated to Israel from his native Lebanon and spied for Hezbollah, and Mahir Kourani, Mohammad Surour, Hussain Sulaiman and Khadr Zaidan, four Hezbollah militants taken prisoner by Israel in the 2006 Lebanon War. Israel also returned the remains of about 200 Lebanese and Palestinian militants killed whose bodies had been brought to Israel and buried there. Eight of these were Hezbollah fighters killed in the 2006 war.

It has long been the general policy of Israel not to return the remains of killed militants that had engaged in "hostile terrorist activity" to their families for burial. The exchange deal was carried out in accordance with the Red Cross and UN observers. On 1 June 2008, Israel released the Lebanese-born Israeli convict Nasim Nisr (Nissim Nasser) in exchange for the remains of the two Israeli soldiers killed during the initial Hezbollah attack.

In October 2007, Israel and Hezbollah agreed to exchange a civilian Hezbollah member kidnapped in 2006 and the remains of two Hezbollah fighters killed and brought to Israel, in exchange for the remains of Gabriel Dwait, an Israeli resident who drowned and washed ashore in Lebanon. The released prisoner was 50-year-old Hassan Naim Aqil, a former Hezbollah guerrilla who did not fight in the Second Lebanon War.

== Reactions ==
Although news of Kuntar's release was met with celebration at a Hezbollah rally in Beirut, Lebanon, Israeli experts believe that the majority of Lebanese people were not pleased with this exchange. The reason for this is because they see this as a victory for Hezbollah, whom they see as an enemy. In Gaza City, many Palestinians celebrated the news of the exchange by handing out sweets.

Israel's deputy foreign minister, Majalli Wehbi, called the Beirut celebrations "shameful", stating that "Kuntar's fans laud a man who prides himself on smashing a child's skull". The foreign ministry also released a public diplomacy video in Arabic claiming Israel's moral victory in the swap.

There was a mixed reaction worldwide, with many American news outlets criticizing the release of Kuntar and condemning the way he was praised in Lebanon.

== See also ==
- Israeli prisoner exchanges
- Hostage diplomacy
- Pidyon shvuyim
