= Israeli–Lebanese conflict =

Conflict involving Israel and Lebanon-based paramilitary groups

- Part of the Arab–Israeli conflict and the Iran–Israel proxy conflict
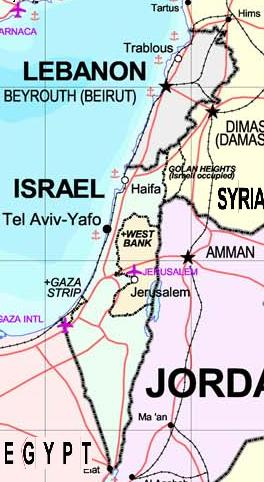
- Israel and Lebanon (regional map)
Date	15 May 1948 – present (78 years, 5 months, 2 weeks and 2 days); Main phases: 1978–2000, 2006, 2023–present
Location	Israel and Lebanon
Status	2024 Israel–Lebanon ceasefire agreement

Belligerents
Lebanese National Movement (until 1982); Lebanese National Resistance Front (1982–2000); Amal Movement; Lebanese Resistance Regiments; (Palestine Liberation Organization) PLO (1968–1982); Syria (1982); Hezbollah (from 1985)	Israel; South Lebanon Army (1978–2000); Lebanese Forces (1970s–1986); Kataeb Regulatory Forces (1970s); Tigers Militia (1970s); Guardians of the Cedars (1970s–1990) Lebanon

Casualties and losses
1,000–1,900 killed Lebanese factions 11,000 killed Palestinian factions	1,400 killed IDF; 954–1,456 killed SLA
- 191+ Israeli civilians killed 5,000–8,000 Lebanese civilians killed Lebanese sources: 15,000–20,000 killed, mostly civilians

The Israeli–Lebanese conflict, or the South Lebanon conflict, is a long-running conflict involving Israel, Lebanon-based paramilitary groups, and sometimes Syria. The conflict peaked during the Lebanese Civil War. In response to Palestinian attacks from Lebanon, Israel invaded the country in 1978 and again in 1982. After this it occupied southern Lebanon until 2000, while fighting a guerrilla conflict against Shia paramilitaries. After Israel's withdrawal, Hezbollah attacks sparked the 2006 Lebanon War. A new period of conflict began in 2023, leading to the 2024 Israeli invasion of Lebanon.

The Palestine Liberation Organization (PLO) recruited militants in Lebanon from among the Palestinian refugees who had been expelled or fled after the creation of Israel in 1948. After the PLO leadership and its Fatah brigade were expelled from Jordan in 1970–71 for fomenting a revolt against the king, they entered southern Lebanon, resulting in an increase of internal and cross-border violence. Meanwhile, demographic tensions over the Lebanese National Pact led to the Lebanese Civil War (1975–1990). PLO actions were one of the key factors in the eruption of the Lebanese Civil War and its bitter battles with Lebanese factions caused foreign intervention. Israel's 1978 invasion of Lebanon pushed the PLO north of the Litani River, but the PLO continued their campaign against Israel. This invasion led to the deployment of United Nations peacekeepers in southern Lebanon. Israel invaded Lebanon again in 1982 and, in alliance with the Christian Lebanese Forces, forcibly expelled the PLO. In 1983, Israel and Lebanon signed the May 17 Agreement providing a framework for the establishment of normal bilateral relations between the two countries, but relations were disrupted with takeover of Shia and Druze militias in early 1984. Israel withdrew from most of Lebanon in 1985, but kept control of a 19-kilometre (12-mile) security buffer zone, held with the aid of proxy militants in the South Lebanon Army (SLA).

In 1985, Hezbollah, a Lebanese Shia Islamist movement sponsored by Iran, called for armed struggle to end the Israeli occupation of Lebanese territory. It fought a guerrilla war against the IDF and SLA in south Lebanon. Israel launched two major operations in southern Lebanon during the 1990s: Operation Accountability in 1993 and Operation Grapes of Wrath in 1996. Fighting with Hezbollah weakened Israeli resolve and led to a collapse of the SLA and an Israeli withdrawal in 2000 to their side of the UN designated border.

Citing Israeli control of the Shebaa farms, Hezbollah continued cross-border attacks intermittently over the next six years. Hezbollah now sought the release of Lebanese citizens in Israeli prisons and successfully used the tactic of capturing Israeli soldiers as leverage for a prisoner exchange in 2004. The capturing of two Israeli soldiers by Hezbollah ignited the 2006 Lebanon War, which saw cross-border attacks and another Israeli invasion of the south. Its ceasefire called for the disarmament of Hezbollah and the respecting of the territorial integrity and sovereignty of Lebanon by Israel. Hostilities were suspended on 8 September.

After the 2006 war the situation became relatively calm, despite both sides violating the ceasefire agreements; Israel by making near-daily flights over Lebanese territory, and Hezbollah by not disarming. There was an increase in violence during the April 2023 Israel–Lebanon shellings.

The Gaza war sparked a renewed Israel–Hezbollah conflict, beginning one day after the October 7 Hamas-led attack on Israel. The conflict initially consisted of tit-for-tat airstrikes and shelling. The conflict escalated in September 2024, beginning with the Israeli explosion of Lebanese pagers and walkie talkies. Israel then began an aerial bombing campaign throughout Lebanon, killing at least 569 people on 23 September; the largest conflict-related loss of life in a single day in Lebanon since the Civil War.

== Background ==
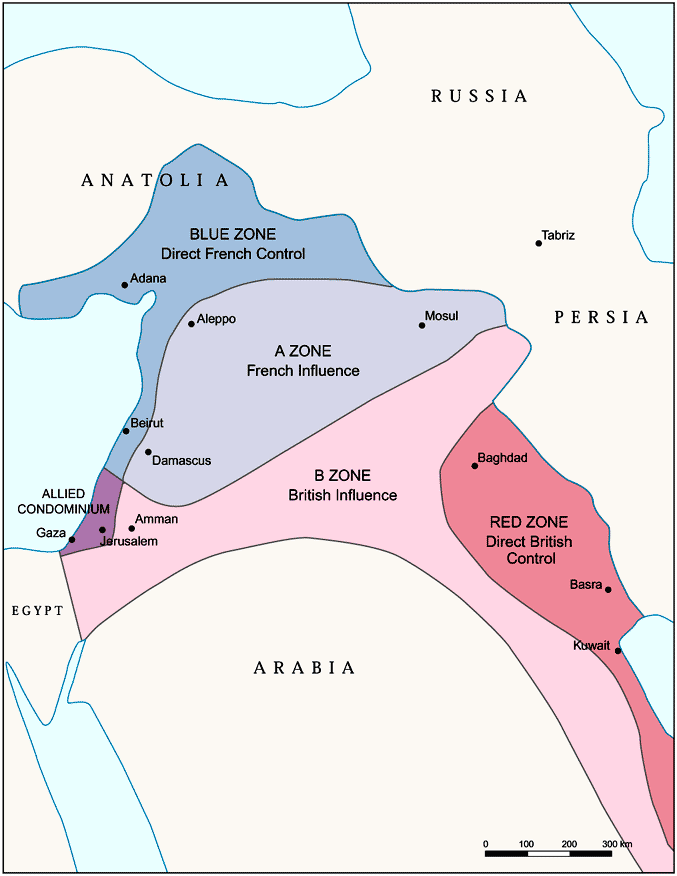
Zones of French and British influence and control imagined by the 1916 Sykes–Picot Agreement.

The territories of what would become the states of Israel and Lebanon were once part of the Ottoman Empire which lasted from 1299 until its defeat in World War I and subsequent dissolution in 1922. As a result of the Sinai and Palestine Campaign in 1917, the British occupied Palestine and parts of what would become Syria. French troops took Damascus in 1918. The League of Nations officially gave the French the Mandate of Syria and the British the Mandate of Palestine after the 1920 San Remo conference, in accordance with the 1916 Sykes–Picot Agreement.

The largely Christian enclave of the French Mandate became the French-controlled Lebanese Republic in 1926. Lebanon became independent in 1943 as France was under German occupation, though French troops did not completely withdraw until 1946.

The rise of antisemitism in Europe, culminating in the Holocaust during World War II, had meant an increase of Jewish immigrants to a minority Jewish, majority Arab Mandate. During the 1936–1939 Arab revolt and thereafter the British increasingly came to rely on Jewish police forces to help maintain order. Eventually, the resultant rise in ethnic tensions and violence between the Arabs and Jews due to Jewish immigration and collaboration would force the British to withdraw in 1947. (The area of their mandate east of the Jordan river had already become the independent state of Jordan in 1946.) The United Nations General Assembly developed a gerrymandered 1947 UN Partition Plan, to attempt to give both Arabs and Jews their own states from the remains of the British Mandate; however, this was rejected by the Arabs, and the situation quickly devolved into a full-fledged civil war.

== History ==
=== 1948 Arab–Israeli War ===
In 1948, the Lebanese army had by far the smallest regional army, consisting of only 3,500 soldiers. At the prompting of Arab leaders in the region, Lebanon agreed to join the other armies that were being assembled around the perimeter of the British Mandate territory of Palestine for the purpose of invading Palestine. Lebanon committed 1,000 of these soldiers to the cause. The Arab armies waited for the end of the Mandate and the withdrawal of British forces, which was set for 15 May 1948.

Israel declared its independence on 14 May 1948. The next day, the British Mandate officially expired and, in an official cablegram, the seven-member Arab League, including Lebanon, publicly proclaimed their aim of creating a democratic "United State of Palestine" in place of the United Nations Partition Plan for Palestine. The League soon entered the conflict on the side of the Palestinian Arabs, thus beginning the international phase of the 1948 Arab–Israeli War. Egypt, Lebanon, Syria, Transjordan, and Iraq declared war on the new state of Israel. They expected an easy and quick victory in what came to be called the 1948 Arab–Israeli War. The Lebanese army joined the other Arab armies in the invasion. It crossed into the northern Galilee. By the end of the conflict, however, it had been repulsed by Israeli forces, which occupied South Lebanon. Israel signed armistice agreements with each of its invading neighbors. The armistice with Lebanon was signed on 23 March 1949. As part of the agreement with Lebanon, Israeli forces withdrew to the international border.

By the conclusion of that war, Israel had signed ceasefire agreements with all of the neighbouring Arab countries. The territory it now controlled went well beyond what had been allocated to it under the United Nations Partition Plan, incorporating much of what had been promised to the Palestinian Arabs under the Plan. However, it was understood by all the state parties at the time that the armistice agreements were not peace treaties with Israel, nor the final resolution of the conflict between them, including the borders.

After the war, the United Nations estimated 711,000 Palestinian Arabs, out an estimated 1.8 million dwelling in the Mandate of Palestine, fled, emigrated or were forced out of Israel and entered neighboring countries. By 1949, there were 110,000 Palestinian Arabs in Lebanon, moved into camps established by and administered by the United Nations Relief and Works Agency for Palestine Refugees in the Near East.

With the exception of two camps in the Beirut area, the camps were mostly Muslim. Lebanese Christians feared that the Muslim influx would affect their political dominance and their assumed demographic majority. Accordingly, they imposed restrictions on the status of the Palestinian refugees. The refugees could not work, travel, or engage in political activities. Initially the refugees were too impoverished to develop a leadership capable of representing their concerns. Less democratic regimes also feared the threat the refugees posed to their own rule, but Lebanon would prove too weak to maintain a crackdown.

The Palestine Liberation Organization (PLO) recruited militants in Lebanon from among the families of Palestinian refugees who had left Israel in 1948.

=== War over water and the Six-Day War (1964–1967) ===
Despite sharing in the ongoing border tensions over water, Lebanon rejected calls by other Arab governments to participate in the 1967 Six-Day War. Militarily weak in the south, Lebanon could not afford conflict with Israel.

Nevertheless, the loss of additional territory radicalized the Palestinians languishing in refugee camps hoping to return home. The additional influx of refugees turned Palestinian camps throughout the Middle East into centers of guerrilla activity.

=== Rise of the PLO militants (1968–1975) ===
The PLO, from its inception in 1964 by Ahmed Shukeri, began executing numerous terror attacks on Israeli civilians in attempt to fulfill its mission charter's vow to pursue in "the path of holy war (al-jihad)" until the establishment of a Palestinian State in place of the State of Israel. The series of attacks (such as the 1966 bombings in Romema, Jerusalem) drove the Israel Defense Forces (IDF) to strike in return, instigating the long and still unresolved struggle between the PLO and the IDF.

From 1968 onwards, the Palestine Liberation Organization (PLO) began conducting raids from Lebanon into Israel, and Israel began making retaliatory raids against Lebanese villages to encourage the Lebanese people to themselves deal with the fedayeen. After an Israeli airline was machine-gunned at Athens Airport, Israel raided the Beirut International Airport in retaliation, destroying 13 civilian aircraft.

The unarmed citizenry could not expel the armed foreigners, while the Lebanese army was too weak militarily and politically. The Palestinian camps came under Palestinian control after a series of clashes in 1968 and 1969 between the Lebanese military and the emerging Palestinian guerrilla forces. In 1969 the Cairo Agreement guaranteed refugees the right to work, to form self-governing committees, and to engage in armed struggle. "The Palestinian resistance movement assumed daily management of the refugee camps, providing security as well as a wide variety of health, educational, and social services."

On 8 May 1970, a PLO faction, called the Democratic Front for the Liberation of Palestine, (DFLP) crossed into Israel and carried out the Avivim school bus massacre.

In 1970, the PLO attempted to overthrow a reigning monarch, King Hussein of Jordan, and following his quashing of the rebellion in what Arab historians call Black September, the PLO leadership and their troops fled from Jordan to Syria and finally Lebanon, where cross-border violence increased.

With headquarters now in Beirut, PLO factions recruited new members from the Palestinian refugee camps. South Lebanon was nicknamed "Fatahland" due to the predominance there of Yasser Arafat's Fatah organization. With its own army operating freely in Lebanon, the PLO had created a state within a state. By 1975, more than 300,000 Palestinian displaced persons lived in Lebanon.

In reaction to the 1972 Munich massacre, Israel carried out Operation Spring of Youth. Members of Israel's elite Special Forces landed by boat in Lebanon on 9 April 1973, and with the aid of Israeli intelligence agents, infiltrated the PLO headquarters in Beirut and assassinated several members of its leadership.

In 1974 the PLO altered its focus to include political elements, necessary for a dialogue with Israel. Those who insisted on a military solution left to form the Rejectionist Front, and Yassir Arafat took over the PLO leadership role.

The Popular Front for the Liberation of Palestine – General Command, which split from the PLO in 1974, carried out the Kiryat Shmona massacre in April of that year. In May 1974, the DFLP crossed again into Israel and carried out the Ma'alot massacre. In retaliation for this attack, Israel bombed and destroyed the Nabatieh refugee camp.

=== Lebanese Civil War (1975–1990) ===
The Lebanese Civil War (1975–1990) was a complex conflict in the form of various factions and shifting alliances between and among Lebanese Maronite Catholics, Lebanese Muslims, Palestinian Muslims, Lebanese Druze, and other non-sectarian groups. Governmental power had been allotted among the different religious groups by the National Pact based partially on the results of the 1932 census. Changes in demographics and increased feelings of deprivation by certain ethnic groups, as well as Israeli–Palestinian clashes in the south of the county all contributed to the outbreak of the Lebanese Civil War.

==== Israeli support to Lebanese Forces ====
Beginning in May 1976, Israel supplied the Maronite militias, including the Lebanese Forces, led by Bachir Gemayel, with arms, tanks, and military advisers. The border between Israel and Lebanon was at this time was nicknamed the Good Fence.

Fearing loss of commercial access to the port of Beirut, in June 1976 Syria intervened in the civil war to support the Maronite dominated government, and by October had 40,000 troops stationed within Lebanon.

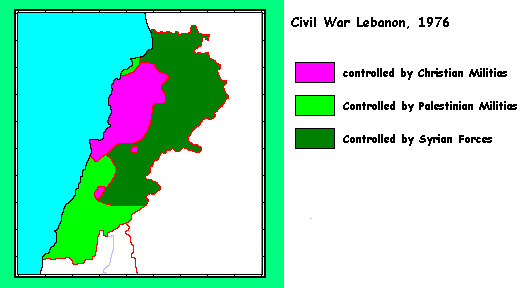
Map showing power balance in Lebanon, 1976: Dark Green – controlled by Syria: Purple – controlled by Maronite groups; Light Green – controlled by Palestinian militias

==== First Israeli invasion of Lebanon ====
On 11 March 1978, eleven PLO militants made a beach landing 30 km. south of Haifa, Israel, where they seized a bus, full of people, killing those on board in what is known as the Coastal Road massacre. By the end of the incident, nine hijackers and 38 Israeli civilians (including 13 children) were dead.

In response, on 14 March 1978, Israel launched Operation Litani occupying southern Lebanon, except for the city of Tyre, with 25,000 troops. The objective was to push the PLO away from the border and bolster a Lebanese Christian militia allied with Israel, the South Lebanese Army (SLA). However, the PLO concluded from the name of the operation that the invasion would halt at the Litani River and moved their forces north, leaving behind a token force of a few hundred men. As a result, the casualties were almost all civilians.

On 19 March 1978, the United Nations Security Council passed Resolution 425, which called for Israel's immediate withdrawal and the establishment of a United Nations Interim Force in Lebanon. When Israel forces withdrew later in 1978, they turned over its positions in Lebanon to the South Lebanon Army which would continue fighting as a proxy for Israel against the PLO until Israel drove the PLO out of Lebanon in 1982.

On 22 April 1979, Samir Kuntar and three other members of the Palestinian Liberation Front, a faction of the PLO, landed in Nahariya, Israel from Tyre, Lebanon by boat. After killing a police officer who had discovered their presence, they took a father and his daughter hostage in an apartment building. After fleeing with the hostages from police back to the beach, a shootout killed one policeman and two of the militants. Kuntar then executed the hostages before he and the remaining invader were captured.

In April 1981, the United States brokered a cease-fire in southern Lebanon among Israel, Syria and the PLO.

==== Second Israeli invasion of Lebanon ====
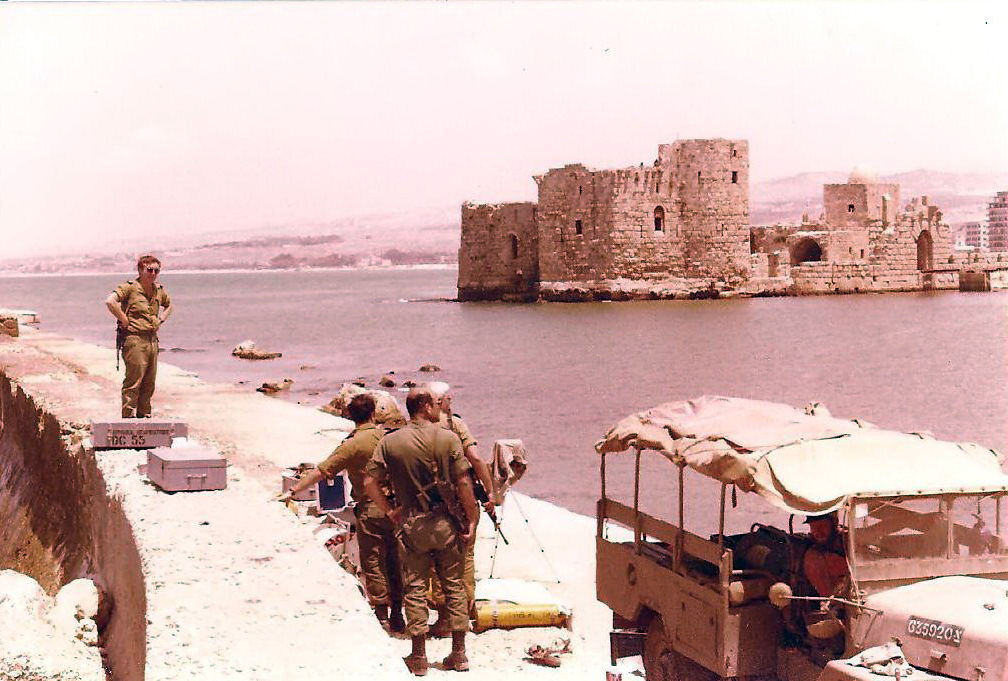
Israeli troops in the Lebanese port city of Sidon, August 1982

The 1982 Lebanon war began on 6 June 1982, when Israel invaded again for the purpose of attacking the Palestine Liberation Organization. The Israeli army laid siege to Beirut. During the conflict, according to Lebanese sources, between 15,000 and 20,000 people were killed, mostly civilians. According to American military analyst Richard Gabriel, between 5,000 and 8,000 civilians were killed. Fighting also occurred between Israel and Syria. The United States, fearing a widening conflict and the prestige the siege was giving PLO leader Yasser Arafat, got all sides to agree to a cease-fire and terms for the PLO's withdrawal on 12 August. The Multinational Force in Lebanon arrived to keep the peace and ensure PLO withdrawal. The PLO leadership retreated from Beirut on 30 August 1982 and moved to Tunisia.

The National Assembly of Lebanon narrowly chose Bachir Gemayel as president-elect, but when he was assassinated on 14 September 1982, Israel reoccupied West Beirut. In parallel, Maronite militia Kataeb Party carried out the Sabra and Shatila massacre.

=== 1983 Israeli-Lebanese accords and their collapse ===
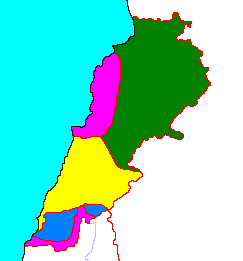
Map showing power balance in Lebanon, 1983: Green – controlled by Syria, purple – controlled by Christian groups, yellow – controlled by Israel, blue – controlled by the UN

In 1983, the United States brokered the May 17 Agreement, a peace treaty between Israel and Lebanon in all but name. The agreement called for a staged Israeli withdrawal over the next eight to twelve weeks and the establishment of a "security zone" to be patrolled by the Lebanese army in southern Lebanon, but was conditional on Syrian withdrawal as well. In August 1983, as Israel withdrew from the areas southeast of Beirut to the Awali River, Lebanese factions clashed for control of the freed territory.

In February 1984, the Lebanese Army collapsed, with many units forming their own militias. Shia and Druze militias took over much of Beirut in early 1984 and consolidated power. The National Assembly of Lebanon, under pressure from Syria and Muslim militias, cancelled the 17 May Agreement on 5 March 1984.

On 15 January 1985, Israel adopted a phased withdrawal plan, finally retreating to the Litani River to form the 4–12 kilometers (2.5–7.5 miles) deep Israeli Security Zone (map at) while using the native South Lebanese Army militia to help control it.

=== South Lebanon conflict (February 1985 – May 2000) ===
==== Consolidation of Hezbollah ====
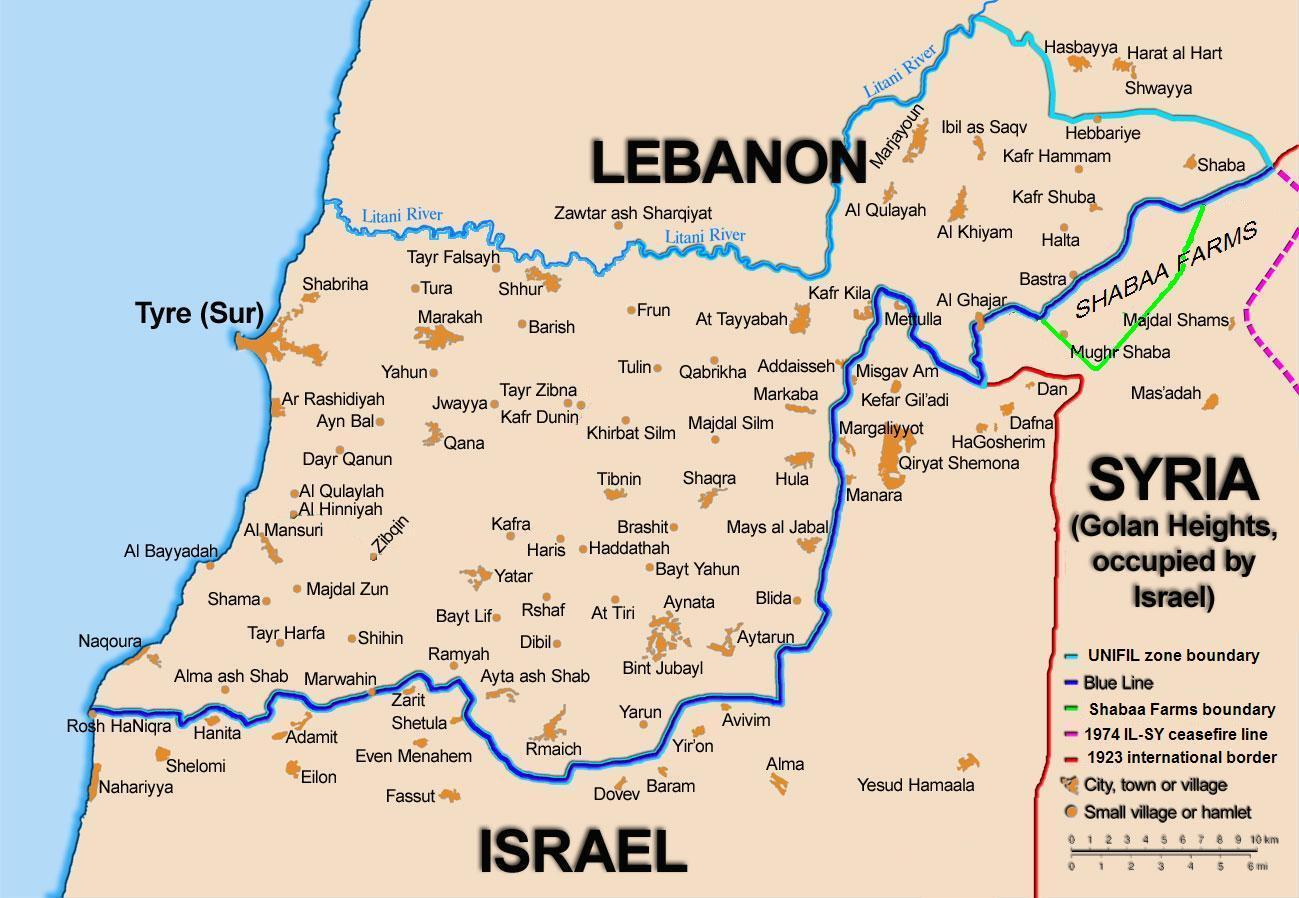
Map of southern Lebanon, featuring the Blue Line, UNIFIL zone, and Litani River (2006).

On 16 February 1985, Shia Sheik Ibrahim al-Amin declared a manifesto in Lebanon, announcing a resistance movement called Hezbollah, whose goals included combating the Israeli occupation. During the South Lebanon conflict (1985–2000) the Hezbollah militia waged a guerrilla campaign against Israeli forces occupying Southern Lebanon and their South Lebanon Army proxies. "Throughout the period of 1985–92, there were very few limited exchanges between Israeli and Hezbollah or Amal forces in southern Lebanon", and "with the exception of 1988, during which twenty-one Israeli soldiers were killed, the number of Israeli fatalities per year over this period was in the single-digit figure".

By the end of 1990, the Lebanese Civil War was effectively over. In March 1991, the National Assembly of Lebanon passed an amnesty law that pardoned all political crimes prior to its enactment, and in May 1991, the militias—with the important exceptions of Hezbollah and the SLA—were dissolved, and the Lebanese Armed Forces began to slowly rebuild themselves as Lebanon's only major non-sectarian institution.

==== Security belt conflict ====
From 1985 through 2000, Israel continued to fund the South Lebanon Army. In 1992, Hezbollah won ten out of 128 seats in the Lebanese National Assembly.

On 25 July 1993, Israel launched Operation Accountability, known in Lebanon as the Seven-Day War. The given reason was to retaliate for the death of IDF soldiers in the "security zone", which Israel had created in 1985 in southern Lebanon to protect its northern borders from both Hezbollah and the Popular Front for the Liberation of Palestine – General Command. On 10 July Hezbollah undertook an operation in which 5 Israeli soldiers were killed; a further attack on 19 July caused several further casualties to the IDF, and on the 23rd. another Israeli soldier was killed. Cross-border raids were frequent from both sides, and Operation Accountability arose from the escalation in hostilities. Thousands of buildings were bombed, resulting in 120 dead and 500,000 displaced civilians. Israeli forces also destroyed infrastructure such as power stations and bridges. According to Michael Brecher, the aim of Operation Accountability was to precipitate a large flight of Lebanese refugees from the south towards Beirut and thereby put the Lebanese government under pressure to rein in Hezbollah. Hezbollah retaliated with rocket attacks on Israeli villages, though inflicting significantly fewer casualties. After Lebanon complained to the UN, the Security Council called on Israel to withdraw its occupying forces from Lebanese territory. A truce agreement brokered by the US secured an Israeli undertaking to stop attacks north of its security zone in Lebanon, and a Hezbollah agreement to desist from firing rockets into Israel.

On 11 April 1996, Israel initiated Operation Grapes of Wrath, known in Lebanon as the April War, which repeated the pattern of Operation Accountability., which was triggered by Hezbollah Katyusha rockets fired into Israel in response to the killing of two Lebanese by an IDF missile, and the killing of Lebanese boy by a road-side bomb. Israel conducted massive air raids and extensive shelling in southern Lebanon. 106 Lebanese died in the shelling of Qana, when a UN compound was hit in an Israeli shelling. The conflict ended on 26 April 1996 with the Israeli-Lebanese Ceasefire Understanding in which both Hezbollah and Israel agreed to, respect the "rules of the game" and forgo attacks on civilians.

In January 2000, Hezbollah assassinated the man responsible for day to day SLA operations, Colonel Akel Hashem. The Israeli Air Force, in apparent response, on 7 February struck Lebanon's civilian infrastructure, including power stations at Baalbek, Deir Nbouh and Jambour. Eighteen people were reported to have been injured.

Following its declaration of intent to implement UNSC Resolution 425 on 1 April 1998, and after the collapse of the South Lebanon Army in the face of a Hezbollah onslaught, Israel declared 24 May 2000 that they would withdraw to their side of the UN designated border, the Blue Line, 22 years after the resolution had been approved. The South Lebanon Army's equipment and positions largely fell into the hands of Hezbollah. Lebanon celebrates 25 May, Liberation Day, as a national holiday.

=== Border clashes and assassinations (September 2000 – July 2006) ===
- In September 2000, Hezbollah forged an electoral coalition with the Amal movement. The ticket swept all 23 parliamentary seats allotted for south Lebanon in that region's first election since 1972.
- On 7 October 2000, three Israeli soldiers – Adi Avitan, Staff Sgt. Benyamin Avraham, and Staff Sgt. Omar Sawaidwere – were abducted by Hezbollah across the Israeli–Lebanese border. The soldiers were killed either during the attack or in its immediate aftermath.
- After Hezbollah killed an Israeli soldier in an attack on an armored bulldozer that had crossed the border to clear bombs on 20 January 2004, Israel bombed two of the group's bases.
- On 29 January 2004, in a German-mediated prisoner swap, one time Amal security head Mustafa Dirani, who had been captured by Israeli commandos in 1994, and 22 other Lebanese detainees, about 400 Palestinians, and 12 Israeli-Arabs were released from Israeli prisons in exchange for Israeli businessman Elchanan Tenenbaum, who had been captured by Hezbollah in October 2000. The remains of 59 Lebanese militants and civilians and the bodies of the three Israeli soldiers captured on 7 October 2000 were also part of the exchange. Hezbollah requested that maps showing Israeli mines in South Lebanon be included in the deal.

In May 2004, Hezbollah militiamen killed an Israeli soldier along the border within the Israeli held Shebaa Farms.

Between July and August 2004, there was a period of more intense border conflict. Hezbollah said the clash began when Israeli forces shelled its positions, while Israel said that Hezbollah had started the fighting with a sniper attack on a border outpost.

On 2 September 2004, Resolution 1559 was approved by the United Nations Security council, calling for the disbanding of all Lebanese militia. An armed Hezbollah was seen by the Israeli government as a contravention of the resolution. The Lebanese government differed from this interpretation.

Syrian troops withdrew from Lebanon in April 2005.

On 26 May 2006, a car bomb killed Palestinian Islamic Jihad leader Mahmoud Majzoub and his brother in Sidon. The Prime Minister of Lebanon Fuad Saniora called Israel the prime suspect, but Israel denied involvement. On 28 May 2006, rockets were fired from Lebanon into Israel.

On 10 June 2006, the Lebanese army arrested members of an alleged Israeli spy ring, including Mahmoud Rafeh, his wife, and two children. Police discovered bomb-making materials, code machines and other espionage equipment in his home. Rafeh reportedly confessed to the Majzoub killings and to working for Mossad, and admitted that his cell had assassinated two Hezbollah leaders in 1999 and 2003 and the son of Ahmed Jibril, leader of the Popular Front for the Liberation of Palestine-General Command, in 2002. Former Lebanese Minister Walid Jumblatt, an outspoken critic of Hezbollah, suspected that the exposure of the spy ring was a Hezbollah fabrication.

=== 2006 Israel–Hezbollah War ===
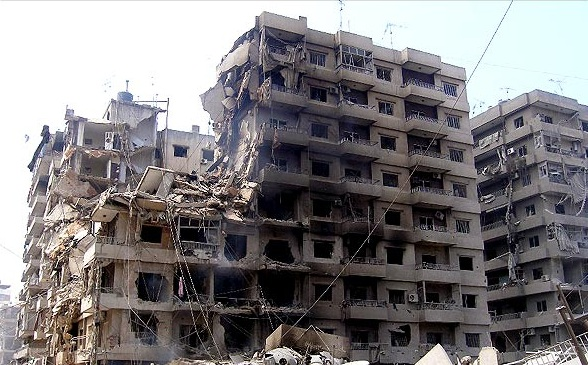
Destroyed buildings in Beirut in 2006

On 12 July 2006, in an incident known as Zar'it-Shtula incident, the Hezbollah initiated diversionary rocket attacks on Israeli military positions near the coast and near the Israeli border village of Zar'it, while another Hezbollah group crossed from Lebanon into Israel and ambushed two Israeli Army vehicles, killing three Israeli soldiers and seizing two.

Hezbollah promptly demanded the release of Lebanese prisoners held by Israel, including Samir Kuntar and an alleged surviving perpetrator of the Coastal Road massacre, in exchange for the release of the captured soldiers.

Heavy fire between the sides was exchanged across the length of the Blue Line, with Hezbollah targeting IDF positions near Israeli towns.

Thus began the 2006 Lebanon War. Israel responded with massive airstrikes and artillery fire on targets throughout Lebanon, an air and naval blockade, and a ground invasion of southern Lebanon. In Lebanon the conflict killed over 1,100 people, including combatants, severely damaged infrastructure, and displaced about one million people. Israel suffered 42 civilian deaths as a result of prolonged rocket attacks being launched into northern Israel causing the displacement of half a million Israelis. Normal life across much of Lebanon and northern Israel was disrupted, in addition to the deaths in combat.

A United Nations-brokered ceasefire went into effect on 14 August 2006. The blockade was lifted on 8 September.

=== Isolated incidents (August 2006–October 2023) ===
==== Israel–Lebanese military border incidents ====
- On 7 February 2007, there was an exchange of gunfire near Avivim between the Lebanese Armed Forces and the Israel Defense Forces, culminating in the firing of two IDF tank shells over the border. There were no injuries on either side. The UN Secretary-General stated it was first armed incident since the end of the last war and that the first fire was by the Lebanese army without any provocation since the IDF was operating inside Israeli territory.
- On 3 August 2010, IDF forces clashed with the Lebanese army. The clash began when the Lebanese army attacked an IDF post with sniper fire, killing an Israeli officer and wounding another. IDF troops at the scene returned fire, and Israel retaliated with air and artillery strikes at Lebanese army positions, killing two Lebanese soldiers and wounding five. A Lebanese journalist was also killed, and one was wounded. The Lebanese claimed they were responding to an Israeli violation of their sovereignty when Israeli troops crossed the border and began cutting down a tree that was in Lebanese territory. The Israelis denied violating Lebanese sovereignty and claimed the tree was in their territory. The United Nations Interim Force in Lebanon (UNIFIL) confirmed Israel's position, adding that Israel had informed them of the border work beforehand.
- On 1 August 2011, Israeli soldiers and Lebanese soldiers exchanged fire. At first it was reported that a Lebanese soldier was killed, but UNIFIL later said no one was killed. UNIFIL findings showed that Israeli troops had not crossed the border, and there was no cause for the clash.
- On 16 December 2013, a Lebanese soldier, acting without orders, fired at a civilian vehicle being driven by an Israeli naval officer along the border, killing him. The soldier then fled the scene and turned himself in to Lebanese authorities. Shortly afterward, IDF troops operating on the Israeli side of the border in the area where the officer was killed fired at what an IDF spokeswoman called "suspicious movement" on the Lebanese side of the border, hitting two Lebanese soldiers.

==== Israel–Hezbollah border clashes ====
- On 7 August 2013, four Israeli soldiers were wounded in a landmine explosion allegedly by Hezbollah. The Lebanese army said that the soldiers were 400 metres (1,300 ft) into Lebanese territory.
- On 14 March 2014, after a detonation of an explosive device in the area of Mt. Dov that wounded three soldiers, the Israeli army fired a number of shells at the village of Kafr Kila in southern Lebanon. In retaliation for the detonation of the explosive device, an Israeli armored force attacked a Hezbollah position in the city of Halata near the Shebaa Farms. A few hours after the incident, the Islamic State of Iraq and al-Sham (ISIS) announced that it was taking responsibility for the attack on the Lebanese border.
- On 18 January 2015, an airstrike on a convoy in the Quneitra District of Syria took place, killing six Hezbollah members and at least one IRGC officer. The UN observers attributed the attack to Israel, which did not officially comment. In response, on 28 January, Hezbollah fired missiles at Israeli convoy in the Shebaa farms disputed territory in the Israeli occupied Golan Heights, killing two soldiers. IDF fired shells into southern Lebanon, killing one Spanish peacekeeper.
- On 1 September 2019, Hezbollah launched rockets from Lebanon into Israel, targeting a military base and an IDF vehicle. Hezbollah claimed Israeli casualties. An IDF vehicle first identified as armored jeep painted with a red Jewish star, later clarified as a vehicle used as an ambulance at the moment was targeted by an anti-tank missile fired by Hezbollah. There were conflicting reports, some stating that the missiles hit, or even destroyed the IDF vehicle and others sources indicating it missed the target. Prime Minister Benjamin Netanyahu said no Israelis were wounded. Two IDF servicemen apparently wounded were sent to Haifa's Rambam Medical Center, but released without getting any medical treatment according to Israel.
- On 27 July 2020, there was an exchange of fire between Israeli soldiers and four Hezbollah members.

==== Lebanese rocket attacks on Israel ====
- On 17 June 2007, an unknown militant group fired two rockets from Lebanon into northern Israel, an action which the UN condemned as a serious violation of the ceasefire. Hezbollah denied involvement in the incident, and Israel emphasized that it would restrain itself from responding by force. Saniora pledged that "The state ... will spare no effort in uncovering those who stand behind this incident." Citing its intelligence and military sources, Debkafile claimed that the shelling was carried out by an order of the Syrian military intelligence by an unknown extremist Palestinian organization called Ansar Allah, and that the launching point was determined by Hezbollah intelligence officers who maintain operational ties and provide weapons to the Ansar Allah fighters.
- On 11 September 2009, at approximately 15:45, there were explosions in the Nahariya area and the western Galilee without an alarm. Two rockets fell in open areas, and no injuries or damage were reported. The IDF responded by firing at the launching sites in southern Lebanon.
- On 29 November 2011, rockets were fired from Lebanon into Israeli territory and exploded in the western Galilee without causing casualties, but property was damaged. In response, the IDF responded by firing at the sources of the fire in Lebanon. Israeli firefighters took control of the fire that broke out in one of the centers. Israel estimated that the rockets were fired by a Palestinian organization.
- On 25 April 2022, a rocket is fired from Lebanon into Matzuva, Israel. Israel responds by firing at targets in Lebanon.
- Between 4–6 of August, Israeli military launched air strikes in South Lebanon following rocket attacks from Hezbollah. This was the first time the IDF used its warplanes on Lebanon since 2006.

==== Israeli airstrikes in Lebanon ====
- On 24 February 2014, the official Lebanese news agency reported that Israeli warplanes carried out two attacks near the Syrian-Lebanese border in the Nabi Sheet area. The Voice of Lebanon radio reported that the target of the attack was Hezbollah convoys, which transferred very advanced rocket weapons from Syria to the organization's bunker in the northern Lebanon Valley. Al-Arabiya reported that the target of the attack was Hezbollah facilities inside Lebanon, near the border and that several Hezbollah members were killed in the attack.
- On 21 June 2015, Al Jazeera reported that Israeli jets attacked targets in the mountainous areas near the town of Saghbine. However, Hezbollah-affiliated Al-Manar reported that an Israeli drone crashed in the area, and that later an Israeli aircraft fired on it and destroyed the downed drone.
- On 10 May 2016, Israeli Air Force attacked a Hezbollah convoy which included six vehicles near the village of Anjar as it made its way from Syria to Lebanon in the Qalamoun Mountains on the border with Syria.
- On 25 March 2018, Arabic media outlets reported that Israeli jets struck a number of Hezbollah positions near the town of Baalbek along the Syrian border. Lebanese al-Jadeed news reported the loud sounds heard by residents of the area were not explosions, but Israeli planes breaking the sound barrier, causing sonic booms. Hezbollah-affiliated Al Manar denied the reports and said that neither Hezbollah or the Syrian army were attacked by Israeli forces.
- On 27 May 2019, Lebanese-based Al Mayadeen said that an Israeli drone struck a surveillance system in southern Lebanon. An additional report said the Lebanese army was at the scene investigating the device, which is said to be Israeli.
- On 25 August 2019, Lebanese and Hezbollah officials reported that, two Israeli drones crashed into the Dahieh district of Beirut, Lebanon. According to Lebanese officials Israeli drones attacked Beirut; one crashed into the roof of the Hezbollah Media Center, about 45 minutes before the second exploded in the air and damaged the building. Hezbollah denied exploding or targeting them. It was the first such incident between Israel and Lebanon since the 2006 Lebanon War.
- On 26 August 2019, Arabic media claimed Israeli aircraft had carried out an airstrike on a base belonging the Popular Front for the Liberation of Palestine – General Command (PFLP-GC), a Syria-based Palestinian militant group. The base is located in the Bekaa Valley in eastern Lebanon, near the border with Syria.

==== Aerial activity ====
- On 6 October 2012, a UAV allegedly operated by Hezbollah from Lebanon was shot down by the Israeli Air Force near Yatir Forest.
- On 11 July 2015, an Israeli Hermes 450 drone crashed near Tripoli port, the drone was located 8 meters below the waterline and was retrieved by the Lebanese Army.
- On 31 March 2018, an Israeli Hermes 450 drone crashed due to a technical failure. An additional Israeli drone bombed the crashed drone. The Lebanese Army issued a statement saying that the crashed drone was found to be equipped with four unexploded ordnance. A technical unit of the Lebanese Army detonated it.
- On 31 October 2019, an Israeli drone was targeted by anti aircraft missile fired by Hezbollah in Southern Lebanon, officials in both countries said. According to Hezbollah the drone was shot down, a claim denied by Israel.
- On 26 July 2020, an Israeli drone crashed in Lebanon amid fears of an escalation with Hezbollah.
- On 22 August 2020, Hezbollah said it shot down an Israeli drone in Ayta ash Shab Southern Lebanon. Later the IDF acknowledged that a drone was lost and fell in Hezbollah hands.
- On 18 February 2022, Israel's Iron Dome fails to intercept a Hezbollah-operated military drone from Lebanon that penetrated seventy kilometers into Israeli airspace. The drone flew for forty minutes before returning to Lebanon. Israeli jets fly at very low altitude over Beirut in response to the incident.
- On 7 April 2023, the Israeli Air Force struck targets in Tyre, Lebanon in response to the 2023 Israel–Lebanon shellings.

==== Other incidents ====
- On 4 December 2013, a Hezbollah Commander, Hassan al-Laqqis was assassinated in Beirut. Israel denied any involvement.
- On 5 September 2014, the official Lebanese news agency reported that an Israeli surveillance device was detonated in the area of the village of Aadloun, in the Sidon area. According to the report, the device was planted in the garden and Hezbollah was the one who detonated it, with increased security measures in the background. On the Lebanese news website "Al-Nashra", however, it was claimed that an Israeli drone had detonated the device after it was discovered. Hezbollah-affiliated channels Al Mayadeen and Al-Manar claimed that a surveillance aircraft detonated the device from a distance.
- On 6 April 2023, dozens of rockets were fired from Lebanon into Israel, wounding 3 Israeli civilians.

=== 2023–present Israel–Hezbollah conflict ===
Map of the 2026 Lebanon war Israel Israeli occupied Golan Heights Attested Hezbollah presence in Lebanon Lebanese territory under Israeli control Syria Litani River (For an up-to-date, interactive, detailed map of the current military situation, see here.)

On 8 October 2023, Hezbollah launched guided rockets and artillery shells at Israeli-occupied positions in Shebaa Farms during the 2023 Gaza war. Israel retaliated with drone strikes and artillery fire on Hezbollah positions near the Golan Heights–Lebanon border, since then a conflict has broken out between militants, (Note: The list of groups includes Hezbollah, the Amal Movement, the Lebanese Resistance Brigades, Hamas, the Palestinian Islamic Jihad, and the Popular Front for the Liberation of Palestine) and Israel on the border.

On 2 January, Israel conducted an airstrike in the Dahieh neighborhood of Beirut, resulting in the assassination of Saleh al-Arouri, the deputy chairman of the Hamas political bureau. on 30 September 2024 Israel launched an invasion of Lebanon against Hezbollah.

In April 2025, Hezbollah signaled willingness to discuss disarmament with President Joseph Aoun, on the condition that Israel withdraws from five southern hilltop positions and halts its strikes. Aoun, under rising pressure, seeks to bring all weapons under state control. The group, weakened by the 2024 conflict, insists Israel must act first before any transfer of arms.

On 5 July 2025, Israel carried out four drone attacks on cities in southern Lebanon resulting in one death and several injuries. Lebanon's Ministry of Public Health said that an “Israeli enemy drone attack on a vehicle” in the Saf al-Hawa area in the city of Bint Jbeil “killed one person and wounded two others.”; a second attack on the same area was conducted following this. The Ministry also reported that another Israeli drone attack wounded one person in Shebaa earlier that morning. Another drone attack was made on the town of Chaqra, in the Bint Jbeil District, wounding two people.

On 30 October, Israeli troops stormed a municipal hall in Blida, Marjayoun District, in southern Lebanon and killed an employee who was asleep. In response, Lebanese president Joseph Aoun ordered the Armed Forces to repel any Israeli incursions, marking a possible new front to the conflict.

== Issues during the conflict ==
=== Israeli incursions into Lebanon ===
Since the civil war, Israel has routinely breached Lebanese airspace, waters, and borders, which is illegal since it violates Lebanon's territory and United Nations Security Council Resolution 425 and 1701.

The most frequent breaches are overflights by Israeli war planes and drones; such violations have occurred since the inception of the Israeli–Lebanese conflict, and have happened continuously and almost daily since the 2006 Lebanon war, being the source of much conflict between Lebanon and Israel. Reporting estimates over 22,000 Israeli incursions into Lebanese airspace have occurred since 2007. Israeli warplanes sometimes stage mock attacks on Lebanese cities, and emit sonic booms that frighten civilians.

In 2007 the Lebanese government complained that Israeli planes had flown into Lebanese airspace 290 times within four months, and that Israeli troops had crossed the border 52 times.

In 2006 French Defense Minister Michele Alliot-Marie stated: "I remind that the violations of the airspace are extremely dangerous, they are dangerous first because they may be felt as hostile by forces of the coalition that could be brought to retaliate in cases of self defense and it would be a very serious incident." US officials on visit in Israel also demanded that Israel stop the overflights since they undermined the standing of Lebanese Prime Minister Fouad Siniora.

On 19 August 2010, the Lebanese military reported that 12 aircraft belonging to the IDF entered into Lebanese territory, which they claim is a violation of Resolution 1701. In the three incidents, the IDF planes made circle maneuvers, fired no shots and left Lebanese airspace soon after.

The UN has continuously protested the repeated Israeli overflights. Lebanese officials fear the escalation in overflights heighten tensions and could lead to war.

Israel rejects such criticism, and claim the overflights are necessary. In spite of this, a leaked US cable shows that Israel offered to stop such violations.

On land, the Blue Line is often crossed, as well as incursions into the Shebaa Farms (which Israel considers Israeli territory as part of Golan Heights, which it captured from Syria in 1967, but which Lebanon claims is Lebanese territory). The 2010 Israel–Lebanon border clash was also performed on the basis of claims of such violations.

At sea, Israeli gunboats have shot into Lebanese territorial waters, and there have been Lebanese claims that Israel is breaching the law of the sea and might lay claim on Lebanese natural resources through the Tamar gas field.

Hezbollah has cited such violations as justification for the legitimacy of its continued armed resistance against Israel.

== See also ==
- List of extrajudicial killings and political violence in Lebanon
- 1958 Lebanon Crisis
- Black September in Jordan
- Cedar Revolution
- 2008 conflict in Lebanon
- Israeli–Palestinian conflict
- List of modern conflicts in the Middle East
- List of rocket attacks from Lebanon on Israel
