= PFLP (disambiguation) =

PFLP may refer to:

- Popular Front for the Liberation of Palestine (PFLP)
- Popular Front for the Liberation of Palestine – General Command (PFLP-GC) based in Syria. Founded in 1968 by Ahmed Jibril after splitting from PFLP
- Popular Front for the Liberation of Palestine – External Operations (PFLP-EO) founded by Palestinian radical Wadie Haddad when engaging in international attacks, that were regarded as terrorism, and were not sanctioned by PFLP
- Popular Front for the Liberation of Palestine – Special Command (PFLP-SC), minor breakout faction from Wadie Haddad's ultraradical PFLP-EO
- Private Fund Limited Partnership, type of business relationship
