= Battle of Yarmouk Camp (December 2012) =

Part of the Syrian Civil War

- Part of the Syrian civil war's Rif Dimashq offensive (November 2012–February 2013)
Date	5–17 December 2012 (1 week and 5 days)
Location	Yarmouk Camp, Damascus, Syria
Result	Indecisive: FSA and Liwa al-Asifa take control of most of Yarmouk; FSA and Syrian Army agree to leave Yarmouk as a neutral, demilitarized zone, but sporadic clashes continue

Belligerents
Syrian Opposition	(Syria) Syrian Government; PFLP–GC

Commanders and leaders
(Syrian opposition) Unknown	Ahmed Jibril; Anwar Raja

Units involved
(Syrian opposition) Free Syrian Army (Palestine) Liwa al-Asifa (Palestinian militia)	Syrian Armed Forces; Syrian Army; 53rd Army Regiment (Special Forces); (Ba'athist Syria) Popular Committees; (Popular Front for the Liberation of Palestine – General Command) Jihad Jibril Brigades

Casualties and losses
(Syrian opposition) Unknown	4 militiamen killed
- 23 civilians killed

The Battle of Yarmouk Camp (December 2012) was a period of fierce clashes in Yarmouk Camp during the Syrian civil war. Yarmouk is a district of Damascus that is home to the biggest community of Palestinian refugees in Syria. The fighting was between the Syrian Army and PFLP-GC on one side, and Syrian rebels on the other. The rebels included the Free Syrian Army (FSA) and a group made up of Palestinians, called Liwa al-Asifa or Storm Brigade. On 17 December, it was reported that the FSA and anti-Assad Palestinians had taken control of the camp. The FSA and Syrian Army agreed to leave Yarmouk as a neutral, demilitarized zone, but sporadic clashes continued.

== Background ==
At the beginning of the Syrian civil war in 2011, the Popular Front for the Liberation of Palestine – General Command (PFLP-GC) was based in Yarmouk and supported Syria's Ba'ath Party government led by the Al-Assad family. At the beginning of the war, tensions arose in Yarmouk between the PFLP-GC and anti-Assad Palestinian residents. On 5 June 2011, a number of Yarmouk residents were shot dead while protesting at the Israeli border. Allegedly angered by the PFLP-GC's refusal to take part in the protests, thousands of mourners burnt down its headquarters in Yarmouk. PFLP-GC members allegedly opened fire on the crowd, killing 14 Palestinians and wounding 43, although this was denied by the group, which blamed Fatah elements inside the camp for the clashes.

On 3 August 2012, Al Arabiya reported that over 21 civilians were killed when the Syrian Army shelled Yarmouk. Palestinian president Mahmoud Abbas condemned the Syrian Army for shelling the camp and chided the PFLP-GC for dragging Palestinians into the conflict. There were meetings and disputes among the various factions in the Yarmouk Camp over the locals' potential role in the civil war. The majority of the camp's population reportedly favored neutrality, but the PFLP-GC -particularly party member Anwar Raja- strongly favored armed support for the government.

On 31 October, the FSA announced that they had helped form a brigade made up of anti-Assad Palestinians, called Liwa al-Asifa (Storm Brigade), who have been armed to take control of Yarmouk. The PFLP-GC leader Ahmed Jibril and his men were accused of harassing Yarmouk's residents and attacking FSA fighters. Many Palestinian men from the camp also joined other FSA units and fought with them in the Damascus districts of Tadamon and Al-Hajar Al-Aswad.

== December clashes ==
Fierce fighting in Yarmouk began on 5 December 2012 and lasted until 17 December. The fighting mainly involved the FSA (along with the Liwa al-Asifa) fighting against the PLFP-GC.

On 16 December, Syrian Army jets bombed Yarmouk, for the first time since the civil war began. Activists reported that a school and mosque sheltering refugees were hit. It was reported that at least 23 were killed, all civilians. About 1,000 Palestinians reached Lebanon less than 48 hours after the bombing. The new arrivals said they were now openly hostile towards the Syrian government that had long portrayed itself as the protector of Palestinians in Syria. Iran's Fars News said that "terrorist" rebels had entered Yarmouk and shot dead "dozens of Palestinians and Syrian civilians".

On 17 December, it was claimed that many PFLP-GC fighters defected to the rebels. One PFLP-GC commander said "I felt that we became soldiers for the Assad regime, not guards for the camps, so I decided to defect". He claimed that government forces stood by and watched as the PFLP-GC fought the rebels, without helping the Palestinians. Ahmed Jibril reportedly fled Damascus for the Mediterranean city of Tartous. PFLP-GC political bureau member Hussam Arafat, however, announced that Jibril was still in Damascus and that only a small number of fighters had defected. That day, rebel forces gained full control of Yarmouk as well as another Palestinian camp, with help from anti-Assad Palestinians, pushing out the pro-government PFLP-GC fighters. The pro-government PFLP-GC fighters were reportedly overwhelmed and suffered great losses as they were unable to evacuate their wounded due to rebel snipers on the roofs. Government forces had surrounded the camp, however, as many refugees fled. PFLP-GC member Anwar Raja reportedly played a major role in working out a strategy to besiege the largely-rebel held camp from this point onward.

=== Resolution attempt ===
On 20 December, the FSA said it had pushed all pro-government fighters out of Yarmouk and handed it back to the Palestinians. The day before, fresh fighting on the outskirts of Yarmouk killed a civilian and four PFLP-GC members.

Shortly after, government and rebel representatives agreed that all armed groups should withdraw from Yarmouk and leave it as a neutral zone. The agreement also said that the PFLP-GC should be dismantled and its weapons surrendered. However, a spokesman for the pro-rebel Palestine Refugee Camp Network said, "the implementation of the truce has been problematic" because of "intermittent" government shelling of Yarmouk and clashes on its outskirts. An AFP reporter at Batikha, the main entrance to the camp, reported sporadic shooting on 21 December but no gunmen were seen on the streets of Yarmouk.

== Aftermath ==
Fellow Palestinian left-wing groups—including the Popular Front for the Liberation of Palestine (PFLP), the biggest Palestinian leftist group—berated Jibril and the PFLP-GC. One PFLP official said "Everyone knows the true size of PFLP-GC. They are not representative of the Palestinians". Another said that Jibril "does not even belong to the Palestinian Left. He is closer to the extremist right-wing groups than to revolutionary leftist ones". On 18 December, the Palestinian National Council (PNC) denounced Jibril, saying it would expel him over his role in the conflict.

On 25 December there was reportedly fighting in or around Yarmouk between rebels and the pro-government Popular Committees.

The UNRWA reported that 12 people were killed and 20 wounded during fighting in Yarmouk on 17 January 2013.

By January 2014, FSA and Liwa al-Asifa controlled 75% of the refugee camp, while the other 25% was controlled by the Syrian Army and the PFLP-GC. The situation had become desperate. "The regime forces won't remove the siege on the camp as long as the militants are staying in it" a pro-Assad Palestinian official, Husam Arafat said. Palestinians in the West Bank have been running a campaign to raise awareness of the siege. "History will curse us if you allow Yarmouk's people to die of hunger," one sign read.
