= Mahmoud Abou Rafeh =

Lebanese police officer and spy

Mahmoud Abou Rafeh

Mahmoud Abou Rafeh is a Lebanese police officer accused of running a spy ring on behalf of Israel.

== Arrest ==
On 10 June 2006 the Lebanese army arrested members of an alleged Israeli spy ring, including Mahmoud Rafeh, his wife, and two children. Police discovered bomb-making materials, code machines and other espionage equipment in his home. Rafeh reportedly confessed to the Majzoub killings and to working for Mossad, and admitted that his cell had assassinated two Hezbollah leaders in 1999 and 2003 and Jihad Ahmed Jibril, leader of the Popular Front for the Liberation of Palestine-General Command, in 2002. Prominent Lebanese politician and lead Cedar-Revolutionist Walid Jumblatt, a then-outspoken critic of Hezbollah, suspected that the exposure of the spy ring was a Hezbollah fabrication.
