= Jihad Jibril Brigades =

Palestinian militant group

Jihad Jibril Brigades كتائب جهاد جبريل
- Founding leader: Ahmed Jibril #
- Leader: Talal Naji
- Founded: 1969
- Dates active: 1969–present
- Country: Palestine and Syria
- Headquarters: Gaza Strip and Syria
- Ideology: Anti-Zionism; Arab nationalism; Palestinian nationalism; Secularism; Socialism
- Status: Active
- Size: Unknown
- Part of: Popular Front for the Liberation of Palestine – General Command; Palestinian Joint Operations Room

The Jihad Jibril Brigades (Arabic: كتائب جهاد جبريل) form the paramilitary branch of the Popular Front for the Liberation of Palestine – General Command (PFLP-GC). They are named after Jihad Ahmed Jibril, the son of founder Ahmed Jibril and former head of the brigades, who died in a car bombing in Beirut in 2002. Their symbolism is the flag of the PFLP-GC in black and white.

== History ==
Originally, they formed the paramilitary branch of the PFLP-GC, founded in 1969 following a split in the Popular Front for the Liberation of Palestine (PFLP) following Jibril's refusal of the Marxization of the PFLP.

The Brigades participated in the South Lebanon conflict alongside Hezbollah, the Lebanese National Resistance Front and the Amal Movement against the Israeli armed forces and their collaborators of the South Lebanon Army. At the same time, the PFLP-GC openly allied itself with Hezbollah.

In 2008, the Jihad Jibril Brigades fired rockets at the Israeli town of Netivot.

The Brigades train their own weapons and have explosives and missile manufacturers. Although secular in obedience, the Brigades moved closer to Hamas in the 2000s, but moved away from it in the 2010s following the Syrian Civil War. However, they maintain active in the Gaza Strip.

They have actively participated in the Syrian Civil War alongside the Syrian Ba'athist government, and have notably clashed with the Free Syrian Army, the pro-rebel Palestinian Islamist group Aknaf Bait al-Maqdis, and the Islamic State during the Battle of Yarmouk Camp. Around 400 members of the PFLP-GC are believed to have died during the Syrian civil war.

The Jihad Jibril Brigades actively participate in joint training in the Gaza Strip with other Palestinian factions, cooperating with the Palestinian Islamic Jihad despite their ideological differences. Their forces have participated in the ongoing Gaza war alongside the al-Qassam Brigades and other allied Palestinian forces.
