= Hossam Arafat =

Hossam Arafat may refer to:

- Hossam Arafat (footballer) (born 1990), Egyptian footballer
- Hossam Arafat (politician), Palestinian politician
