= Night of the Gliders =

Palestinian militant attack in 1987

- Part of the South Lebanon conflict (1985–2000)
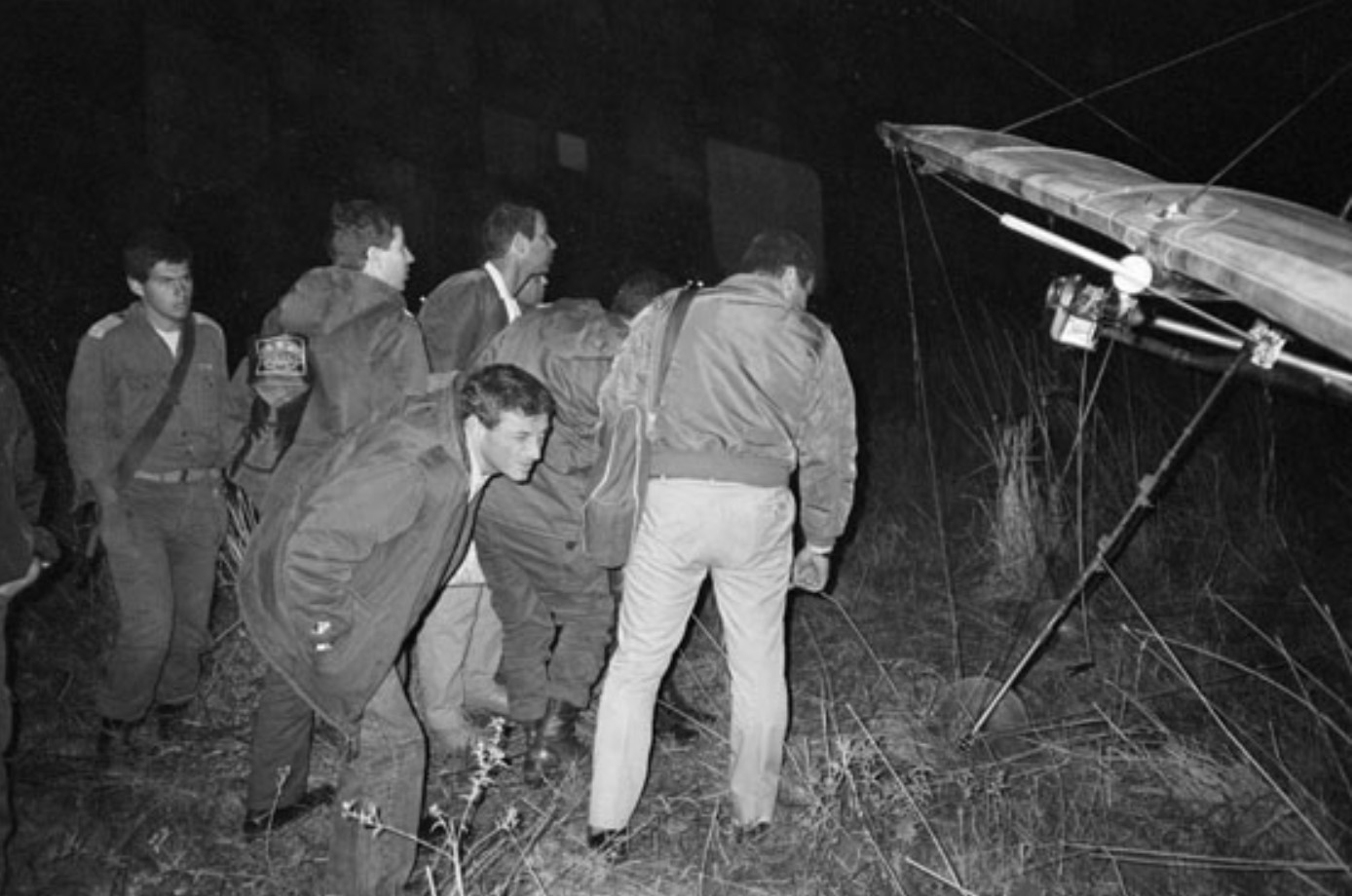
- Soldiers inspecting a glider

- The attack site
- Native name: ליל הגלשונים
- Location: 33°13′23″N 35°36′06″E; East of Kiryat Shmona, Israel (near the Lebanese border)
- Date: 25 November 1987; 38 years ago
- Attack type: Surprise attack, mass shooting
- Deaths: 6 Israeli soldiers (+2 attackers)
- Injuries: 8 Israeli soldiers
- Perpetrator: PFLP-GC
- No. of participants: 2

The Night of the Gliders (Hebrew: ליל הגלשונים, lit. 'Leil HaGilshonim') was an attack by the Popular Front for the Liberation of Palestine - General Command (PFLP-GC) against Israeli soldiers in northern Israel on 25 November 1987, in which two Palestinian guerrillas infiltrated into Israel from South Lebanon using hang gliders to launch a surprise attack. One militant was tracked down and killed by Israeli security forces before entering Israel. The other managed to cross into Israel, shooting an army truck and entering an IDF base, killing six Israeli soldiers and wounding at least seven others before being shot dead.

The Israeli military was heavily criticized for its perceived impotence in the face of the attack, despite Israel initially detecting the hang gliders and issuing warnings to nearby posts. Due to the use of hang gliders and the Israeli military's inability to stop an attack despite its military prowess and advance warning, the Night of the Gliders has been compared to the October 7 attacks.

== Background ==
In 1987, Israel was occupying a security zone in Southern Lebanon. One of the organizations fighting Israel there was Ahmed Jibril's Popular Front for the Liberation of Palestine - General Command (PFLP-GC), a Damascus-based Palestine Liberation Organization (PLO) splinter group, which had been operating in Lebanon since the late 1960s, launching attacks on north Israel. The PFLP-GC had carried out dozens of attacks in Europe and the Middle East during the 1970s and 1980s.

The fence along the border made it difficult to cross into Israel. In March 1981, a similar attempt was made when an intruder, using a motorized hang glider reached Haifa Bay and tossed some bombs, but was forced to land after running out of fuel and was arrested.

== Attack ==
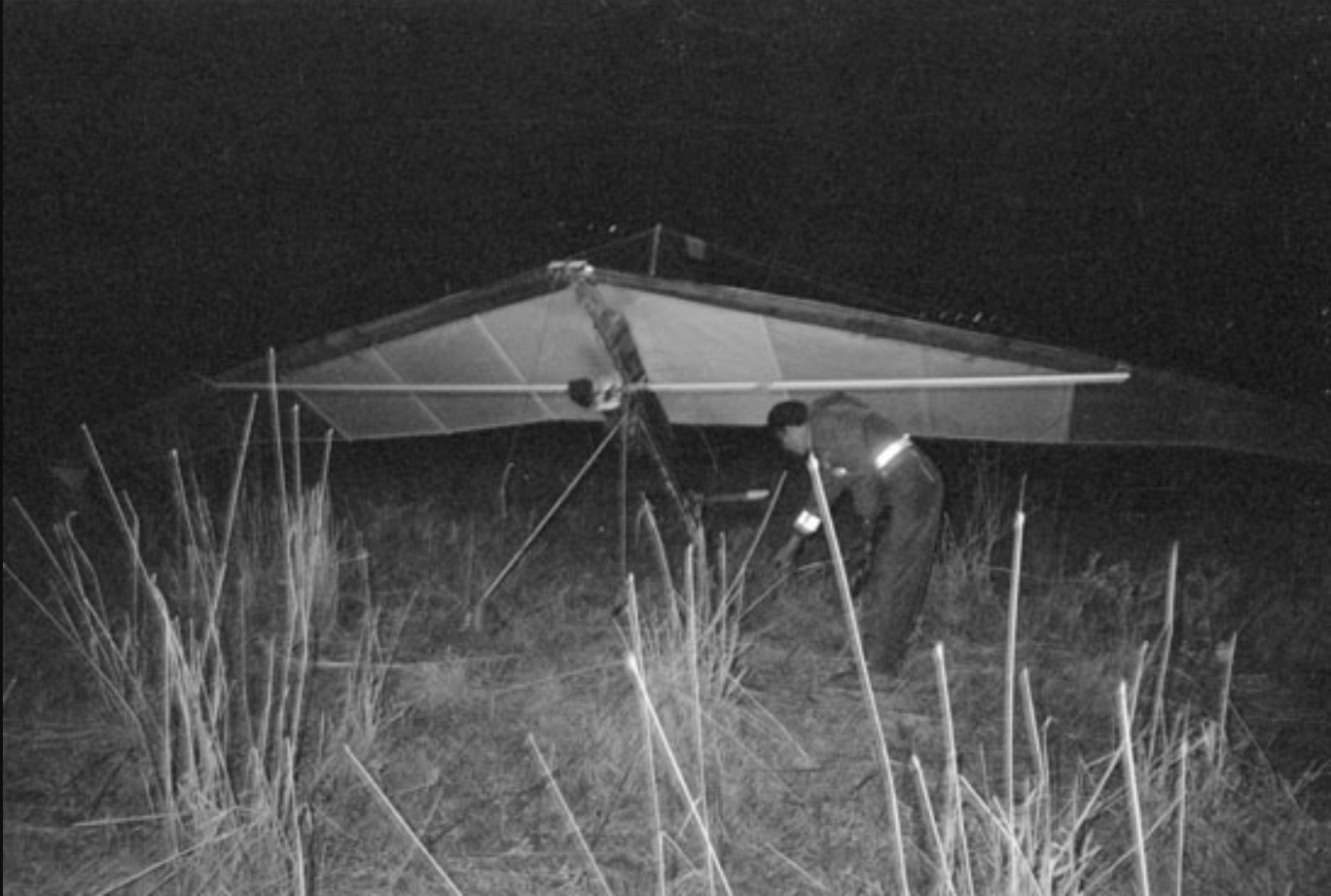
An Israeli soldier inspecting one of the gliders

On the night of 25 November 1987, two PFLP-GC militants, Khaled Akar (Arabic: خالد آكر) and Melod Najah (Arabic: ميلود نجاح), took off on hang gliders from Southern Lebanon, perhaps from a Syrian controlled area, each armed with an AK-47 assault rifle, a pistol with a silencer, and several hand grenades. Each militant's hang glider was retrofitted with a lawn mower-size engine and a small propeller.

The engine noises were heard by Israeli soldiers, and at 10:30 PM the Israeli Northern Command was alerted to the danger of an infiltration. An alarm was sounded, flares were fired, and helicopters were sent out to search for the gliders, but without success, as the gliders were flying as low as tree level. However, at the Camp Gibor base, about two miles east of Kiryat Shmona, no security precautions had been taken thirty minutes after the alarm was issued and no additional guards had been posted at the camp's gate. It was later discovered that an early intelligence warning was neglected by all except Kibbutz Ma'ayan Baruch, due to lack of attention.

Akar's glider failed to cross the Israeli border, and he landed in the Israeli-controlled security zone as a result of being blinded by the searchlights from Kibbutz Ma'ayan Baruch. He was tracked down and killed by Israeli troops. Within minutes of take off, Najah landed near Camp Gibor. Najah spotted a passing army truck outside the base and opened fire on it, killing the driver and wounding the corporal riding with him. He then headed towards a nearby army encampment manned by Nahal Brigade soldiers some 175 meters away. He hurled grenades and sprayed automatic fire at the sentry, who panicked and ran away, allowing him free entry into the encampment. He then fired his AK-47 and threw grenades into tents being used by Israeli soldiers, killing five and wounding seven, but was then shot and killed by an Israeli soldier (a quartermaster clerk) who had been wounded. Six Israeli soldiers were killed and at least seven were wounded in the attack.

== Aftermath ==
The attack was the most lethal in Israel in nearly a decade.

=== Israeli reactions ===
The day after the attack saw many businesses and institutions closed whilst residents were told to go in to bomb shelters as military commandos looked for any further attackers.

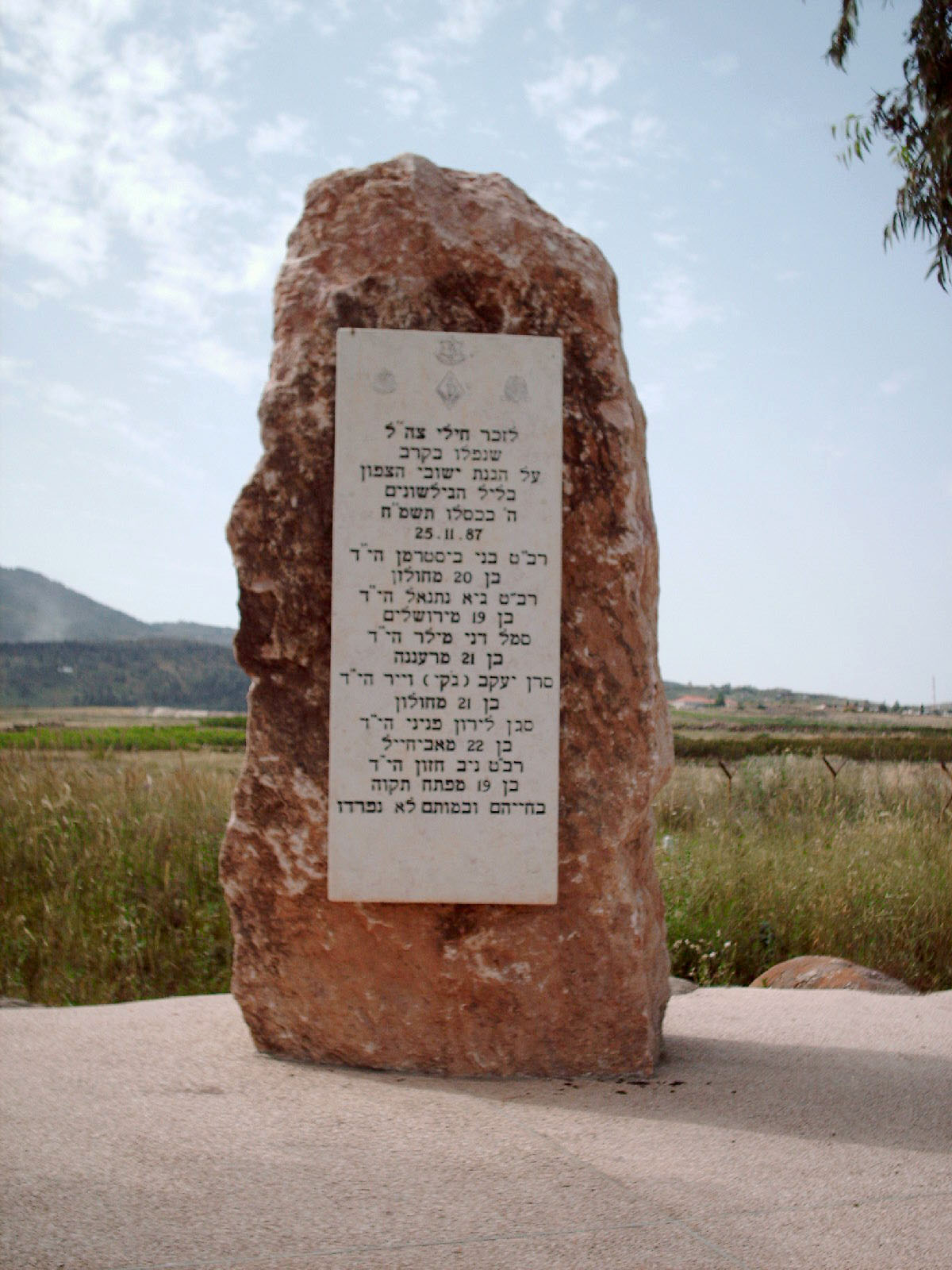
A monument near Kiryat Shmona commemorating the victims of the attack.

The IDF was heavily criticized by the Israeli press. The headline of Maariv read "Foul-Up in the North – A Blow to the Army". The press also called for an investigation as to how the infiltration was possible. Israeli Prime Minister Yitzhak Shamir blamed Syria for the attack, saying "It is clear that they could not have done it without the patronage and the help of the Syrians", and stated that Israel held Syria responsible. Deputy Chief of Staff (Ramatkal) Ehud Barak vowed that the PFLP-GC "will in due time pay the price". Speaking before the Knesset on 30 November, Israeli Defense Minister Yitzhak Rabin sent his condolences to the families of the casualties. He assured the residents of the Galilee that the IDF will do the best they can to prevent similar raids. However, he admitted that "all the steps required by orders and procedures were not taken in this camp, which led to the grave consequences."

At first, the only soldier indicted was the sentry, 19 year old Roni Almog, who was court marshaled and sentenced to a three years imprisonment for cowardice leading to the deaths of six others. Only following public pressure did Chief of Staff Dan Shomron decide to take further proceedings and transfer the brigade operations officer from his position. This gave birth to the phrase "The sentry syndrome" (Tismonet HaShin-Gimel), meaning that a system is trying to shake off responsibility for a failure by putting all the blame on the lowest possible rank.

A monument commemorating the casualties of the incident was raised near Kiryat Shmona.

=== Palestinian reactions ===
The PFLP-GC assumed responsibility for the attack in a communique the next day, claiming the guerrillas waged a ″heroic battle.″ which was seen as a morale boost. On 3 December, PLO chairman Yasser Arafat praised the attack, saying "The attack demonstrated that there could be no barriers or obstacles to prevent a guerrilla who has decided to become a martyr." Palestinian newspapers in the West Bank placed the story on their front headlines and in colored ink, but were prevented from printing anything but the barest details of the incident by the Israeli Military Censor. Palestinians adopted the guerrilla as a national hero and began taunting Israeli troops, crying "six to one", and the writing "6:1" appeared on walls in Gaza. On 9 December, riots broke in the Gaza Strip, marking the beginning of the First Intifada. The incident is often seen as a catalyst for the riots.

== Legacy ==
The Washington Post compared the initial assault during the October 7 attacks with the Night of the Gliders. In both attacks, the Israeli army was caught off-guard by a surprise attack by militants on hang gliders. While Israeli soldiers heard the engines above them, investigating assets did not engage. In the aftermath of both attacks, Israeli military leaders wondered how they had been caught flat-footed by a relatively unsophisticated attack, given Israel's military prowess.

== See also ==
- Night of the Pitchforks
