= Revolutionary Socialist Action Organization =

The Revolutionary Socialist Action Organization (Arabic: منظمة العمل الاشتراكي الثوري) was a short-lived Lebanese political party, a sister organization of the Palestinian PFLP-GC.
