= Ahmed Jibril =

Palestinian politician (1937–2021)

- أحمد جبريل
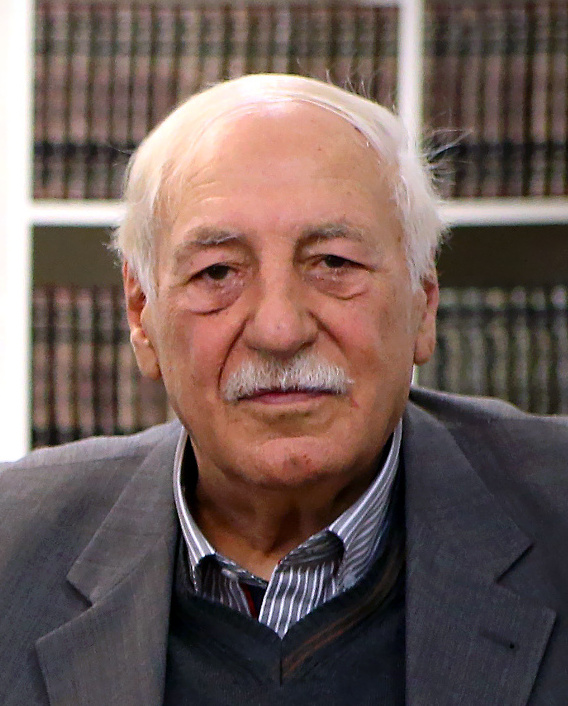
- Jibril in 2015

Founder and leader of the Popular Front for the Liberation of Palestine – General Command
- In office 1968–2021

Personal details
- Born: c. 1937 Mandatory Palestine
- Died: 7 July 2021 Damascus, Syria
- Party: Popular Front for the Liberation of Palestine – General Command
- Children: Jihad Ahmed Jibril (deceased)

Ahmed Jibril (Arabic: أحمد جبريل; c. 1937 – 7 July 2021) was a Palestinian militant and political leader who was the founder and leader of the Popular Front for the Liberation of Palestine – General Command (PFLP-GC).

During the Syrian Civil War, Jibril was a notable supporter of the Assad government and PFLP-GC members helped government forces to fight the Syrian opposition. However, after clashes with rebels in Yarmouk Camp in Damascus, the PFLP-GC suffered defections and was forced to withdraw from the camp, and Jibril fled the city.

== Early life ==
Born to a Palestinian father and Syrian mother, Jibril's year of birth is given by different sources as 1935, 1937 and 1938 and his place of birth as Yazur, Jaffa, Ramla and Ramallah in Mandatory Palestine as well as Iraq and Syria. When the First Arab-Israeli War began in 1948, his family moved to Homs, Syria, where he was raised. He graduated from the Homs Military Academy and served in the Syrian Army from 1956 until 1958, rising to the rank of captain before being expelled as a suspected Communist. In 1959, he founded the Palestinian Liberation Front. Beginning in 1965, he worked closely with the leadership of the Palestinian National Liberation Movement (Fatah), including Yasser Arafat. In 1967, he joined with George Habash to form the Popular Front for the Liberation of Palestine (PFLP), a Palestinian Marxist–Leninist and revolutionary socialist organization that combined Arab nationalism with the leftist ideology, and which was in conflict with Arafat.

== Break from the PFLP ==
In 1968, Jibril broke away from the PFLP because of disputes over the more revolutionary Marxism advocated by Habash and Nayef Hawatmeh. He formed a new organization, the pro-Syrian "The Popular Front for the Liberation of Palestine – General Command" (PFLP-General Command).

Jibril never wavered from his belief that Palestine could only be liberated through military attrition. He joined George Habash and other splinter groups which opposed negotiations with the Israeli government. He launched a variety of inventive attacks, including the "Night of the Gliders" on 25 November 1987.

== Leader of PFLP-GC ==
Samuel Katz's Israel vs. Jibril distinguishes the PFLP-GC and Jibril's strategy from the rest of the Palestine Liberation Organization (PLO) by its emphasis on military training and equipment, and not on declarations and publicity stunts. This caused the group to fail to make a significant mark on the public debate. Since 1994's Oslo Accords, support for the PFLP-GC dwindled among Palestinians.

On 7 May 2001, the Israeli Navy seized a Palestinian boat filled with heavy weapons in the port of Haifa. Jibril is believed to have been behind the shipment of weapons, which were bound for the Gaza Strip.

During the Syrian Civil War, the PFLP-GC helped the Syrian Army to fight the Syrian rebels in and around Yarmouk Camp – a district of Damascus that is home to the biggest community of Palestinian refugees in Syria. Several members of the PFLP-GC's central committee opposed this alliance with the government and resigned in protest. By 17 December 2012, the rebels, which included Palestinians, had won control of Yarmouk. Jibril fled Damascus, reportedly for the Mediterranean city of Tartous. Palestinian left-wing groups—including the PFLP—berated Jibril and the PFLP-GC. One PFLP official said that Jibril "does not even belong to the Palestinian Left. He is closer to the extremist right-wing groups than to revolutionary leftist ones". On 18 December, the Palestinian National Council (PNC) denounced Jibril, saying it would expel him over his role in the conflict.

Ahmed Jibril

In a 17 February 2017, Jibril did an interview with Al Mayadeen and expressed his hope that the Iranian military with others would fully back the future Palestinian war against Israel.

Talal Naji succeeded Jibril as the secretary-general of the PFLP-GC.

== Personal life ==
Jibril's son, Jihad Ahmed Jibril, who headed the PFLP-GC's military wing and was in line to replace Jibril as leader of the group, was killed by a car bomb in Beirut on 20 May 2002.

== Death ==
Jibril died of heart failure on 7 July 2021, in Damascus, Syria. After a funeral service in the Al-Othman Mosque in Damascus with his coffin draped in the Palestinian flag, he was buried in the Martyrs Cemetery of the Yarmouk Palestinian refugee camp.

== See also ==
- Jibril Agreement
- Kiryat Shmona massacre
