= Mahmoud al-Majzoub =

Palestinian militant leader (c. 1965–2006)

Mahmoud al-Majzoub also known as Abu Hamza (c. 1965 – May 26, 2006) was a top Palestinian Islamic Jihad official and a senior leader of the group. He was also a liaison officer who had strong ties to Iran's IRGC and Hezbollah. He was killed in a car bomb blast in Sidon on 26 May 2006, when a bomb attached inside the car door exploded as he opened it. His brother Nidal al-Majzoub also died in the explosion. PIJ, Hezbollah and the Lebanese Government stated that they held Mossad and Israel responsible for the bombing, but Israel denied it.

In mid-June 2006, the Lebanese authorities arrested a group of alleged spies, among them policeman Mahmoud Abou Rafeh, who reportedly confessed to working for Israel and carrying out the attack. Some Lebanese opponents of Hezbollah suspect this spy ring is a Hezbollah fabrication.
