= Avivim school bus bombing =

1970 terrorist attack by Palestinian militants in Israel

- Part of the Palestinian insurgency in South Lebanon
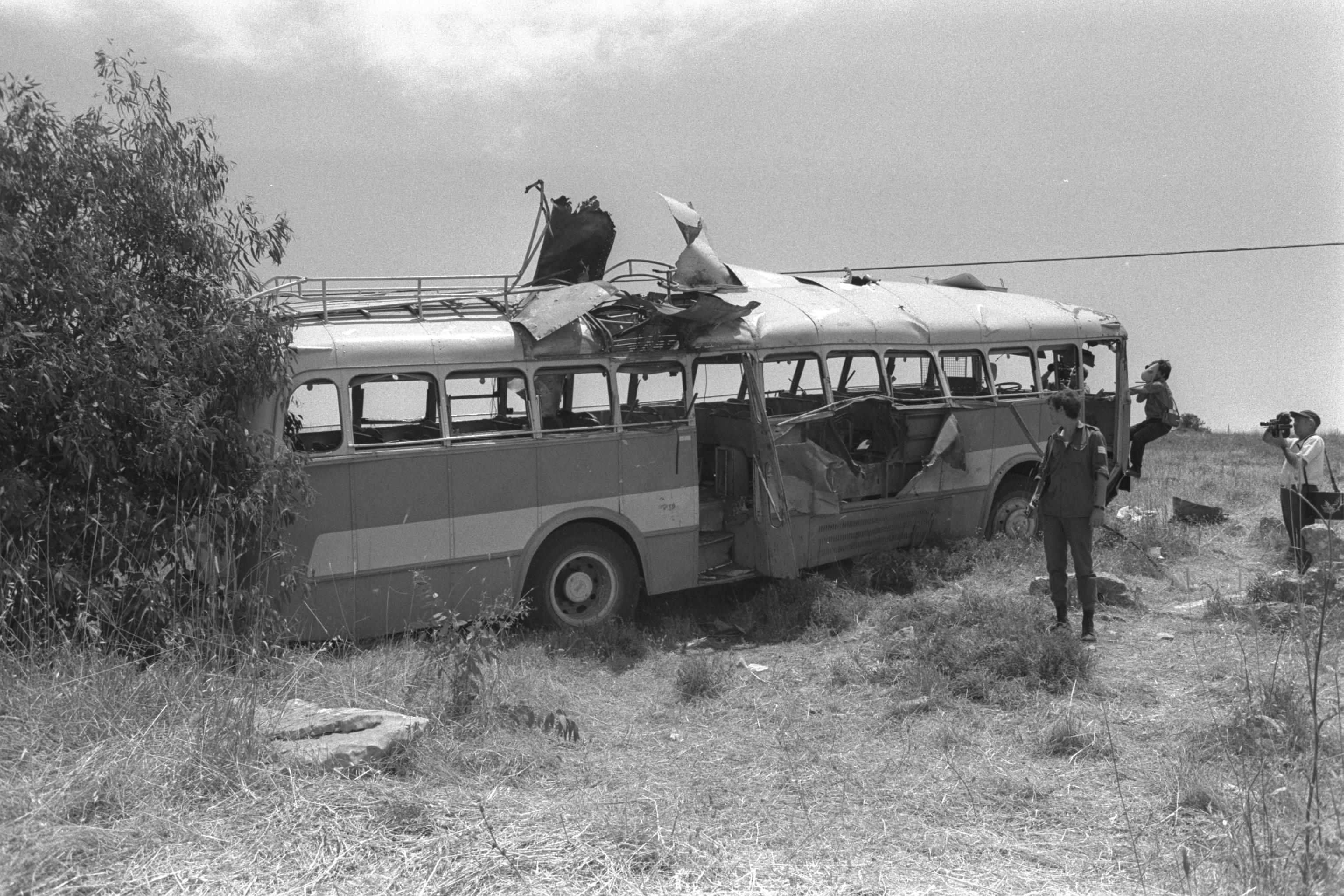
- Avivim school bus

- The attack site
- Location: 33°03′43″N 35°25′24″E; Near Avivim, northern Israel
- Date: 22 May 1970; 56 years ago
- Target: Israeli school bus
- Attack type: Ambush
- Weapons: Rocket propelled grenades, gunfire
- Deaths: 12 civilians (including 9 children)
- Injuries: 25
- Perpetrator: PFLP-GC

The Avivim school bus bombing was a terrorist attack on an Israeli school bus on 22 May 1970, in which 12 civilians were killed, nine of them children, and 25 were wounded, one of whom died of a wound sustained in the attack 44 years later. The attack took place on the road to Moshav Avivim, near Israel's border with Lebanon. Two rocket-propelled grenades were fired at the bus. The attack was one of the first carried out by the PFLP-GC.

== Attack ==
Early in the morning, the bus departed from Avivim heading with its passengers to two local schools. This route had been scouted by the Palestinian militants, believed to have infiltrated from Lebanon, and an ambush was set up. As the bus passed by, ten minutes after leaving Avivim, it was attacked by heavy gunfire from both sides of the road. The driver was among those hit in the initial barrage, as were the two other adults on board. The three were killed as the bus crashed into an embankment as the attackers continued firing into the vehicle.

The attackers were never apprehended.

=== Fatalities ===
The children, who were in first to third grade, were buried in a special plot in Safed. A monument commemorating the victims of the attack stands in the middle of the moshav.

- Ester Avikezer, 23
- Yehuda Ohayon, 10
- Yafa Batito, 8
- Mimon Biton, 7
- Haviva Biton, 7
- Hanna Biton, 8
- Shimon Biton, 9
- Shulamit Biton, 9
- Makhlouf Biton, 28
- Aliza Peretz, 14
- Rami Yarkoni, 29
- Shimon Azran, 35

Leah Revivo, who survived the attack at age nine, died in 2014 at age 52 from an infection brought on by a piece of shrapnel lodged in her brain as a result of the attack.

== Aftermath ==
In response to the ambush, Israel launched artillery strikes on southern Lebanon, killing twenty civilians, wounding forty, and prompting thousands of residents to flee north. The IDF also began conducting regular armored patrols inside southern Lebanon. These events were later cited as one of the motivations for the Dawson's Field hijackings of 6 September 1970.
