= Talal Naji =

Secretary-General of the PFLP-GC

Personal details
- Born: Talal Naji; April 1946 (age 80) Nazareth, Mandatory Palestine
- Party: Popular Front for the Liberation of Palestine-General Command

Talal Naji (Arabic: طلال ناجي; born April 1946) is the secretary general of the Popular Front for the Liberation of Palestine-General Command (PFLP-GC). He has been deputy secretary general of the group since 1973 and succeeded Ahmed Jibril, founder of the PFLP-GC, as the leader of the organization.

== Biography ==
Naji was born in the Christian town of Nazareth in April 1946 to a Sunni Muslim family, he was a member of the Palestinian Liberation Front before joining Jibril's PFLP-GC in 1969.

He was elected as secretary-general of the PFLP-GC in 2021 following the death of Ahmed Jibril.

He met Qasem Soleimani in 2015.

In June 2019, Talal Naji stated that 1,858 Palestinians died in Syria fighting in the ranks of Syrian loyalist forces.

In 2022, interviewed by the Iranian agency Tasmin, he paid tribute to Qasem Soleimani by calling him "leader of the Axis of Resistance" and adding that the Axis of Resistance is more prepared than ever. According to him, Soleimani declared to him "Transmit to every Palestinian fighter, to every Palestinian mujahideen, to every martyred father and to every martyred mother, that we accept their hands".

In 2023, with a delegation of the PFLP-CG, he presented the Palestinian situation to the Minister of Foreign Affairs and Expatriates of the Baathist Syrian government, Faisal Mekdad.

After the fall of the Assad regime, he was imprisoned on 3 May 2025 by Syrian authorities in Damascus due to his links with Bashar al-Assad. He was later released after 10 hours.
