= Popular Front for the Liberation of Palestine – Special Command =

Minor faction from Wadie Haddad's PFLP-SC

- Leader: Salim Abdul Salem (Abu Muhammad)
- Dates active: 1978–1985
- Split from: PFLP-EO
- Active regions: Middle East, Western Europe
- Ideology: Marxism–Leninism

The Popular Front for the Liberation of Palestine – Special Command (PFLP-SC; Arabic: الجبهة الشعبية لتحرير فلسطين - القيادة الخاصة) was a minor breakout faction from Wadie Haddad's ultraradical Popular Front for the Liberation of Palestine – External Operations (neither group should be confused with more established Palestinian factions, such as the PFLP or the PFLP-GC).

The PFLP-SC formed as a breakout organization from the PFLP-EO in 1978, the year of Haddad's death. It was never part of the Palestine Liberation Organization (PLO), and it is unclear if it had a political program. It claimed responsibility for several bomb attacks on civilians in Western Europe, possibly performed with support from Libya, Iraq or Syria. It is believed to have ceased operations in the 1980s.

== See also ==
- Popular Front for the Liberation of Palestine
- Popular Front for the Liberation of Palestine – General Command
- Popular Front for the Liberation of Palestine – External Operations
- Democratic Front for the Liberation of Palestine
