= Hossam Arafat (politician) =

Palestinian politician

Member of the Political Bureau of the Popular Front for the Liberation of Palestine - General Command

Personal details
- Party: Popular Front for the Liberation of Palestine - General Command
- Occupation: Politician

Hossam Arafat (Arabic: حسام عرفات) is a Palestinian politician. As of 2014, he was a member of the Political Bureau of the Popular Front for the Liberation of Palestine - General Command (PFLP-GC) and the representative of PFLP-GC inside Palestine. He is based in the West Bank.
