= Jihad Ahmed Jibril =

Palestinian activist

Mohammed Jihad Jibril
- Born: Mohammed Jihad Ahmed Jibril; 1961; Damascus, Syria
- Died: 20 May 2002 (aged 40–41); Beirut, Lebanon
- Children: 2
- Parent: Ahmed Jibril

Mohammed Jihad Ahmed Jibril (1961 – 20 May 2002) was the son of Ahmed Jibril, founder of the Popular Front for the Liberation of Palestine – General Command (PFLP-GC). He was assassinated in Beirut on 20 May 2002.

== Early life and education ==
Jihad Ahmed Jibril was born in Damascus, Syria, in 1961. He is the eldest son of Ahmed Jibril. He attended the Libyan military academy from 1981 to 1983 and graduated with the rank of a lieutenant colonel. He was studying law at Lebanese University when he was assassinated.

== Political activity and attacks ==
Jibril became the leader of the military wing of the PFLP-GC and was the heir apparent of the organization before he was killed. He was also a member of the Popular Front's executive committee. Jibril was reported to have participated in an airborne attack on Israel in 1987, killing six Israeli soldiers.

Jibril was seriously injured in an explosion during an exercise in the Bekaa valley in 1997. He also experienced an assassination attempt in 2000 when his car came under fire near a PFLP-GC base south of Beirut.

== Personal life ==
Jibril was married with two children; Ahmed (born 1992) and Ali (born 1996).

== Death ==
Jibril was killed in a car bombing in Beirut on 20 May 2002. A 2 kg TNT booby trap had been put under the driver's seat of his car. The blast occurred in a crowded commercial center in Beirut's Mar Elias district. The bomb exploded nearly at 11:45 am when Jibril turned the ignition key. The assassination was blamed by his father and others on Israel, but it denied the allegations. In mid-June 2006, Lebanon authorities arrested a group of alleged spies who reportedly confessed to working for Israel and carrying out the attack. Other Israelis, one American Central Intelligence Agency (CIA) employee, and one Canadian Security Intelligence Service (CSIS) agent were implicated in the assassination but never charged. Some Lebanese opponents of Hezbollah suspected the alleged spy ring was a Hezbollah fabrication.

== Legacy ==
The Jihad Jibril Brigades, the paramilitary branch of the Popular Front for the Liberation of Palestine-General Command, bears his name in homage to his person.
