= Popular Front for the Liberation of Palestine – External Operations =

Palestinian militant organisation

- Leader: Wadie Haddad
- Dates active: c. 1972–1976
- Active regions: Middle East, West Bank, operations in Uganda, Israel
- Ideology: Marxism–Leninism; Palestinian nationalism
- Status: Defunct

The Popular Front for the Liberation of Palestine – External Operations (PFLP-EO; Arabic: الجبهة الشعبية لتحرير فلسطين - العمليات الخارجية) or Special Operations (PFLP-SO; العمليات الخاصة) or Special Operations Group (PFLP-SOG; مجموعة العمليات الخاصة) was a Palestinian militant organisation led by Wadie Haddad.

== Relationship to the PFLP and other organisations ==
Haddad had been a leading member of the Arab Nationalist Movement (ANM), which was one of the groups that came together to found the Popular Front for the Liberation of Palestine (PFLP) in late 1967. He oversaw its Special Apparatus, which was responsible for so-called external operations - attacks conducted outside the borders of historic Palestine. The Dawson's Field hijackings, organised by Haddad, were held within the PFLP to have provoked the Black September crackdown on the Palestine Liberation Organization (PLO) in Jordan, and Haddad was extensively criticized, especially by the organisation's left. At a central committee meeting in early November 1970, the PFLP agreed to suspend external operations in general and the tactic of airplane hijacking specifically.

Haddad was later instructed to brief the whole PFLP leadership before conducting further external operations, but he refused to do so, saying that he would liaise only with George Habash, and to a lesser extent with three other senior figures. Haddad paused hijackings for more than a year, but defied the moratorium by organising the hijack of Lufthansa Flight 649 in February 1972. In reaction, the PFLP's third general conference on 7 March 1972 voted to dissolve the Special Apparatus and expel Haddad. Haddad continued to be friendly with Habash, however, and channeled substantial funds to the PFLP over the following three years.

According to Leila Khaled, Haddad was ultimately expelled from the PFLP only in 1976, after the PFLP-EO hijacked an Air France plane and forced the crew to land it at Entebbe Airport in Uganda. Khaled has said that Haddad maintained relationships with some PFLP members until his death in 1978.

Hadad cooperated with non-PFLP organizations such as the Abu Nidal Organization, the West German Revolutionary Cells (RZ) and the Japanese Red Army. He also employed his PFLP protégé, Ilich Ramírez Sánchez ("Carlos the Jackal"), who remains imprisoned in France.

== Death ==
Wadie Haddad died in 1978, in East Berlin, East Germany. This was first reported as being from leukaemia, and later from possible poisoning by Mossad. According to the book Striking Back, published in 2006, Haddad was assassinated by the Mossad, which had sent the chocolate-loving Haddad Belgian chocolates coated with a slow-acting and undetectable poison which caused him to die several months later. "It took him a few long months to die", Klein said in the book.

== Related groups ==
- 15 May Organization
- Popular Front for the Liberation of Palestine
- Popular Front for the Liberation of Palestine – General Command
- Popular Front for the Liberation of Palestine – Special Command
- Democratic Front for the Liberation of Palestine
- Lebanese Armed Revolutionary Factions

== Sources ==
- Irving, Sarah (2012). Leila Khaled: Icon of Palestinian Liberation (PDF ed.). London: Pluto Press. ISBN 978 1 84964 673 4.
- Sayigh, Yezid (1997). Armed Struggle and the Search for State. Oxford: Clarendon Press. ISBN 0-19-829265-1.
