= Avivim =

Moshav in northern Israel

Avivim: אֲבִיבִים (Hebrew)
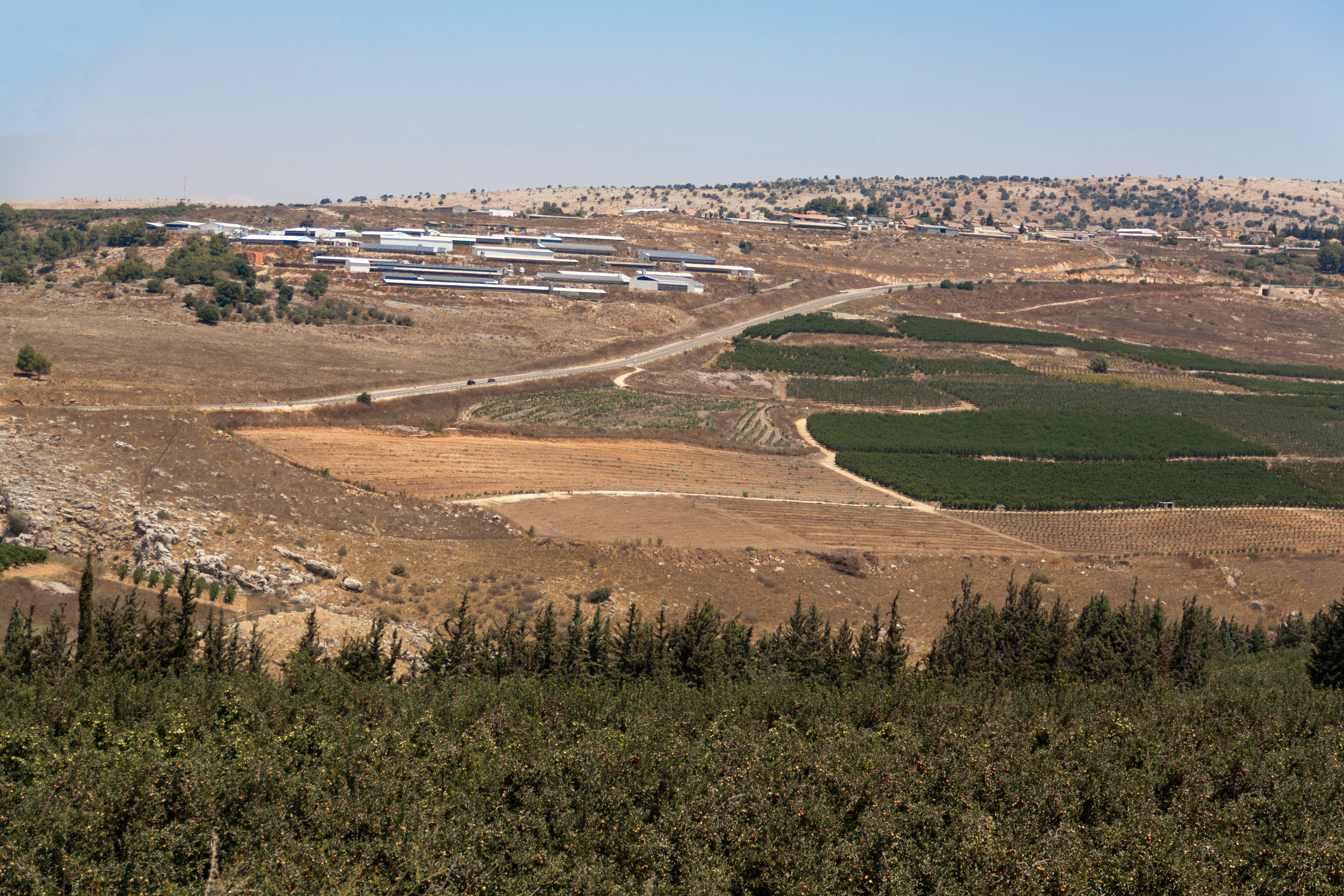

- Location within Northeast Israel Location within Israel
- Coordinates: 33°5′21″N 35°28′19″E
- Country: Israel
- District: Northern
- Subdistrict: Safed
- Council: Merom HaGalil
- Affiliation: Moshavim Movement
- Founder: Moroccan Jews
- Population (2024): 555

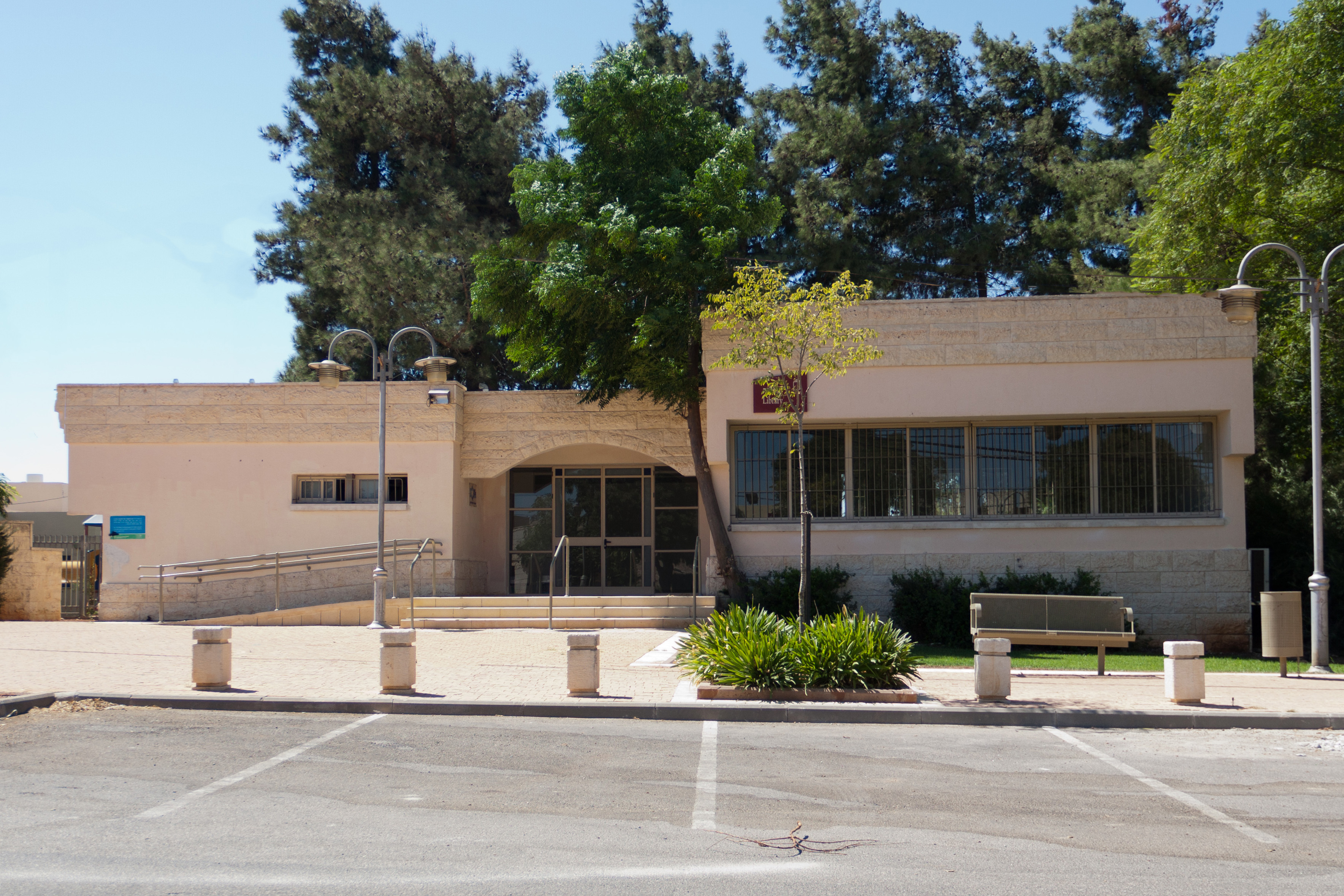
Avivim public library

Avivim (Hebrew: אֲבִיבִים) is a moshav in Israel, in the northernmost part of Upper Galilee, less than one kilometre (3,000 feet) from the Blue Line with Lebanon. In 2024, its population was 555.

== History ==
=== Mandatory period ===
In 1920, Saliha was designated part of Lebanon under the auspices of the Franco-British Boundary Agreement. It was one of 24 villages transferred to British control in 1924 following the 1923 demarcation of the border between the British Mandate for Palestine and the French Mandate for Syria and the Lebanon. It thus formed part of the British Mandate of Palestine.

Under the 1947 United Nations Partition Plan for Palestine, Saliha was to be included in the proposed Arab state, while the boundary between it and the proposed Jewish state was to run north of the built-up area of the village. During the 1948 Arab–Israeli War, Saliha was the site of a massacre carried out by Israeli forces shortly before the village was completely depopulated. The built structures in the village, with the exception of an elementary school for boys, were also destroyed. Israeli forces blew up the village mosque, killing 60–94 people who were inside.

=== Israeli period ===
Moshav Avivim was founded in 1958, abandoned, and then re-established in 1963 by immigrants from the Maghreb, mostly Moroccan Jews.

=== South Lebanon conflict ===
The moshav's proximity to the Lebanese border has made it a target for violent attacks, most notably the Avivim school bus massacre. On May 8, 1970, militants of the pro-Syrian Baathist As-Sa'iqa organization fired two bazooka shells at the community school bus, killing nine children and three adults, and injuring 19 others. In October 1970, guerrillas in Lebanon fired mortars at Avivim, triggering an alert along the Lebanese border.

Avivim also suffered during the 2006 Lebanon War, and was subject to at least one infiltration attempt by Hezbollah. The moshav also came under fire from Hezbollah forces in the nearby village of Maroun al-Ras, across the border in Lebanon.

Amidst the 2023 conflict between Hamas and Israel, Hezbollah militants directed their focus to northern Israeli border communities, necessitating the evacuation of several areas, including Avivim. on October 22, the IDF struck a Hezbollah cell in southern Lebanon, preventing an anti-tank guided missile attack on Avivim.
