= Palestinian insurgency in South Lebanon =

1968–1982 conflict

- Part of the Israeli–Palestinian conflict, the Lebanese Civil War, and the Arab Cold War
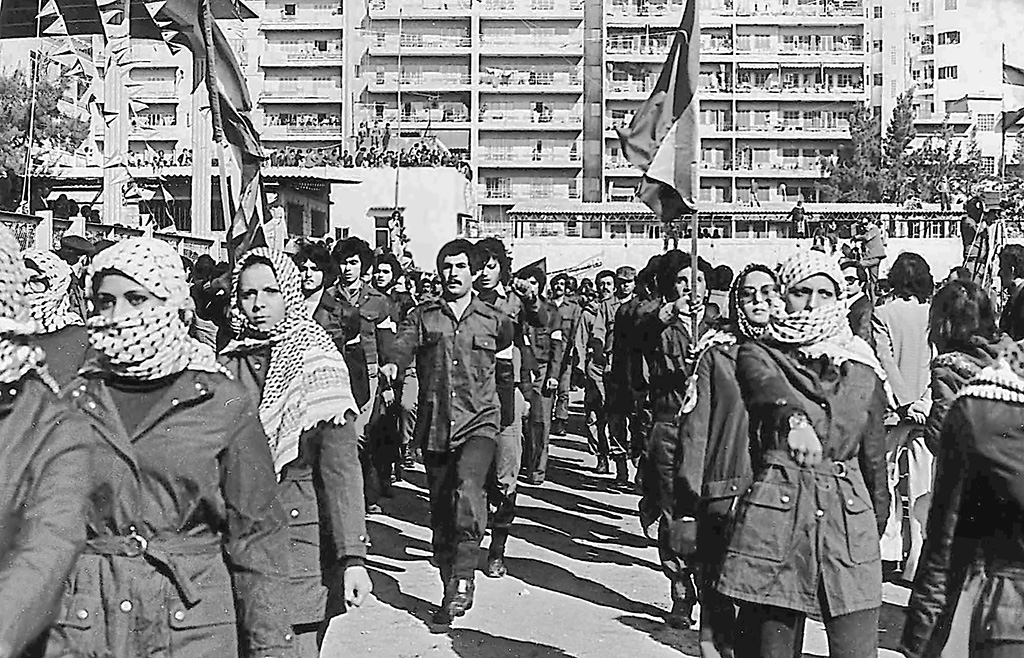
- Fedayeen of Fatah at a rally in Beirut, 1979
Date	1968–1982 (14 years)
Location	South Lebanon; North Israel
Result	Israeli victory: Expulsion of the Palestine Liberation Organization from Lebanese territory to Tunisia, after Israel's invasion of Lebanon in 1982; Beginning of the South Lebanon conflict in 1985
Territorial changes	Syrian occupation of Lebanon (1976–2005); Israeli occupation of Lebanon (1985–2000)

Belligerents
Israel; South Lebanon Army; Lebanese Forces Amal Movement; Sunni armed groups	Palestine Liberation Organization; Syria; Lebanese National Movement; Lebanese National Resistance Front; Supported by: Soviet Union

Commanders and leaders
1982: Menachem Begin; Ariel Sharon; Rafael Eitan; Saad Haddad; Antoine Lahad; Bachir Gemayel X	1982: Yasser Arafat; Hafez al-Assad; Mustafa Tlass; Rifaat al-Assad; Hikmat al-Shihabi; Kamal Jumblatt X; Walid Jumblatt

Strength
1982: 78,000; 5,000; 30,000	1982: 15,000; 22,000; 25,000

The Palestine Liberation Organization (PLO) led an insurgency against Israel in 1968 and against Lebanese Christian militias in the mid-1970s. PLO's goals evolved during the insurgency; by 1977, its goal was to pressure Israel into allowing a Palestinian state in the West Bank and the Gaza Strip. In 1982, Israel invaded Lebanon and expelled the PLO, thereby ending the insurgency.

During the 1948 Palestine war, about 100,000 Palestinians fled or were expelled by Israel into Lebanon; it is from these Palestinian refugee camps that most insurgents were recruited. In 1968, PLO guerrillas began conducting raids into Israel, and Israel conducted retaliatory raids into Lebanon. At the time, PLO's objective was to establish a single democratic state in all of historical Palestine with equal rights for Jews, Muslims and Christians. By 1977, the objective had evolved to establishing a Palestinian state in the West Bank and the Gaza Strip, alongside Israel. The Lebanese army was too weak to prevent the PLO from using Lebanese soil as a base for the insurgency, and eventually the PLO succeeded in creating a state within a state in southern Lebanon known as Fatahland. Within this state, the PLO and allied Leftist groups established a dictatorship and oppressed the local population, leading the flight of over 300,000 Shia Muslims alone and armed resistance by the Lebanese population.

The insurgency continued during the 1970s, and served as a major catalyst for the outbreak of the Lebanese Civil War in 1975. Fighting between the Palestinians and the Christian militias lasted until the Israeli invasion of Lebanon in 1982, which led to the expulsion of the Palestine Liberation Organization (PLO) from Lebanese territory. While the PLO relocated to Tunisia in the aftermath of Israel's invasion, other Palestinian militant factions, such as the Syria-based PFLP–GC, continued to carry out low-level operations from Syrian-occupied Lebanon. After 1982, the insurgency is considered to have faded in light of the inter-Lebanese Mountain War and the Israel–Hezbollah conflict, the latter of which took place for the duration of the Israeli occupation of South Lebanon.

== Background ==
During the 1948 Palestine war, 730,000 Palestinians fled or were forced to leave by Zionist forces, (Note: Before the establishment of Israel, Palestinians were expelled by Zionist paramilitaries; after the establishment of Israel, Palestinians were expelled by the Israeli army itself.) of which 100,000 arrived in Lebanon. Most of the guerrillas would be recruited from Palestinian refugee camps. By 1969, this population had grown to 235,000 as a result of natural population growth and immigration, including Palestinians who fled or were expelled by Israel during the 1967 war. On the eve of the 1982 Israeli invasion, the Palestinian population in Lebanon was 375,000.

While the first Palestinian attack on Israel from Lebanon happened in 1965, the number of armed Palestinians prior to 1967 was estimated at just 200. The 1967 Six-Day War stimulated the growth of the Palestinian fedayeen (guerrillas). After 1967, the number of armed Palestinians increased to 2,000 and by 1968 it had reached 15,000.

=== PLO's political objectives ===
Palestinian guerrilla action intended to serve as a war of independence for Palestinians. While the envisioned goal evolved, by 1977, PLO's political objective was to create a Palestinian state in the West Bank and Gaza Strip.

In 1968, the PLO called for the establishment of a nonsectarian democratic state in all of the former British Mandate, with the return of all Palestinian refugees without expelling Jews from the region, thereby tacitly accepting Jewish presence in a possible Palestinian state. In 1974, PLO accepted the creation of a "national authority" in the West Bank and Gaza as a first stage towards a Palestinian state. This represented a fundamental change in PLO's objectives, as it was interpreted as an acceptance of a two state solution, and thus an implied recognition of Israel.

This tacit recognition of Israel caused the Rejectionist Front to break away. who accused the PLO of "capitulation" and even assassinated PLO diplomats. Many Israelis dismissed these changes, arguing that the idea of "stages" implied the PLO sought to create a single state. Some Palestinians who supported the 1974 changes insisted that a single democratic state remained their long-term objective.

This ideological struggle continued until the 13th PNC meeting in March 1977, which endorsed the idea of a Palestinian state alongside Israel. This "independent state" would comprise the West Bank and Gaza, which was widely interpreted as accepting Israel's permanent existence. Shortly after that, the PLO established contacts with the Israeli left.

== History ==
=== Early period ===
The PLO had begun to set up bases and launch attacks on Israel from within Lebanon in 1968 and the Lebanese government, under pressure from other Arab states allowed the PLO to operate in Southern Lebanon. Within a few weeks though the PLO began to spread its forces into the rest of Lebanon, leading to clashes between them and the Lebanese army. While Israel began launching retaliatory attacks on the PLO and Lebanon, with the goal of encouraging the Lebanese government to expel Palestinian militants.

PLO encroachment and a desire to stop Israeli raids led to the outbreak of clashes between the Lebanese government and the PLO, in which Lebanon failed to drive the PLO from Lebanon. Neighboring Arab states sided with the PLO, Syria closed its border with Lebanon and begun funneling weapons and militants into Lebanon, Iraq imposed economic sanctions, and Egyptian president Nasser strong armed Lebanon into signing the Cairo agreement of 1969. This agreement gave the PLO extraterritorial rights within the Palestinian refugee camps and allowed the PLO to launch attacks on Israel from all of Lebanon. Within the refugee camps the PLO established a state within a state referred to as "Fatahland" doing the domestic and foreign functions the Lebanese state normally would while their militants operated freely and openly. With headquarters moved to West Beirut, PLO factions recruited new members from the Palestinian refugee camps.

After an Israeli airline was machine-gunned by Palestinian militants at Athens Airport, Israel bombed the Beirut International Airport in retaliation, destroying 13 civilian aircraft. On 8 May 1970, a PLO faction called the Democratic Front for the Liberation of Palestine (DFLP) crossed into Israel and carried out the Avivim school bus massacre, a bombing which killed 13 civilians, 9 of whom were children, and injured 25 others, all children.

In 1970, the PLO attempted to overthrow a reigning monarch, King Hussein of Jordan, and following his quashing of the rebellion in what Arab historians call Black September, the PLO leadership and their troops fled from Jordan to Syria and finally Lebanon, where cross-border violence increased.

=== Increasing PLO power ===
The PLO established many relationships with various groups in the area it controlled, primarily with leftist groups. This led to the creation of the Lebanese National Movement and various PLO front organizations. This PLO-leftist alliance and the flood of Palestinians into Lebanon upset the delicate balance of power between the various demographics of Lebanon by radicalizing the Muslim Lebanese and increasing the power of broadly secular leftism, which did not fit perfectly into any pre-existing group. Many Muslims saw the PLO-leftist alliance as an opportunity to strengthen their position in Lebanon at the expense of the dominant Christians while Christians began fearing for their very existence in the face of the PLO-leftist alliance, growing PLO territory, and the Lebanese governments impotence.

In reaction to the 1972 Munich massacre, Israel carried out Operation Spring of Youth. Members of Israel's elite Special Forces landed by boat in Lebanon on 9 April 1973, and with the aid of Israeli intelligence agents, infiltrated the PLO headquarters in Beirut and assassinated several members of its leadership.

In 1973 Lebanon was once again forced into conceding more power to the PLO, the Melkah Agreement gave the PLO even more power within Lebanon. In response to this the Christians began developing their own armed militias. By 1975, more than 300,000 Palestinian displaced persons lived in Lebanon. Aside from being used as an operation base for raids on Israel and against Israeli institutions across the world, the PLO and other Palestinian militant organizations also began a series of airplane hijack operations, targeting Israeli and international flights, carrying Israelis and Jews. The extreme sectarian division and destabilization of Lebanon came to a head in May 1973 when Christian leader Pierre Gemayel was attacked, killing four in his entourage. In response Christian forces killed either 22 PLO militants (according to the Lebanese Government) or 26-28 Palestinian and Leftist civilians returning from a rally (according to Yasser Arafat). This then escalated into a full blown civil war by 1975.

In 1974, the PLO altered its focus to include political elements, necessary for a dialogue with Israel, alongside militancy. Those who insisted on a military solution left to form the Rejectionist Front, and Yasser Arafat took over the PLO leadership role.

The Popular Front for the Liberation of Palestine – General Command, which split from the PLO in 1974, carried out the Kiryat Shmona massacre in April of that year. In May 1974, the DFLP crossed again into Israel and carried out the Ma'alot massacre.

=== Lebanese Civil War and Syrian intervention ===
The Lebanese Civil War (1975–1990) was a complex conflict in the form of various factions and shifting alliances between and among Lebanese Maronite Catholics, Lebanese Muslims, Palestinians, Lebanese Druze, and other non-sectarian groups. Governmental power had been allotted among the different religious groups by the National Pact based partially on the results of the 1932 census. Changes in demographics and increased feelings of deprivation by certain ethnic groups, as well as Israeli–Palestinian clashes in the south of the country all contributed to the outbreak of the Lebanese Civil War.

As the PLO's conflict with Israel and enemy Lebanese groups continued it continued to capture more Lebanese territory and began pushing into Lebanon's Christian heartland. At first the Christians fought against the PLO-leftist alliance alone but they were later joined by parts of the Lebanese army, they were later also joined by Syria which had initially supported the PLO but later turned on them, realizing a Palestinian controlled Lebanon would go against their interests by depriving access to the Port of Beirut. Beginning in May 1976, Israel supplied the Maronite militias, including the Lebanese Forces, led by Bachir Gemayel, with arms, tanks, and military advisers. The border between Israel and Lebanon was at this time was nicknamed the Good Fence.

On 11 March 1978, eleven PLO militants made a sea landing in Haifa, Israel, where they hijacked a bus, full of people, killing those on board in what is known as the Coastal Road massacre. By the end of the day, nine hijackers and 37 Israeli civilians were killed. In response, on 14 March 1978, Israel launched Operation Litani occupying southern Lebanon, except for the city of Tyre, with 25,000 troops. The objective was to push the PLO away from the border and bolster a Lebanese Christian militia allied with Israel, the South Lebanese Army (SLA). On 22 April 1979, Samir Kuntar and three other members of the Palestinian Liberation Front, a sometimes faction of the PLO, landed in Nahariya, Israel from Tyre, Lebanon by boat. After killing a police officer, who had discovered their presence, they took a father and his daughter hostage in an apartment building. After fleeing with the hostages from police back to the beach, a shootout killed one policeman and two of the militants. Kuntar then executed the hostages before he and the remaining invader were captured.

=== PLO occupation, oppression, and Lebanese resistance ===
In the areas it occupied within Lebanon the PLO established a de facto independent state known as "Fatahland". With its capital in Beirut the PLO In this state the PLO-Leftist alliance established a dictatorship in which opposition, particularly from Shias, Sunnis, and Christian was suppressed with violence, threats, blackmail, and bribery. The PLO also established control on the flow of information out of its territory. It limited what foreign journalists could access and coerced them with threats, intimidation, kidnapping, and violence into providing positive press coverage. The PLO used anti-Christian propaganda to weaken the legitimacy of Christian resistance to their rule, frequenetly attacking Christians as isolationists, traitors, rightists, fascists, anti-Arab, and Israeli collaborators. Many Shia Muslims fled the PLO as they advanced, during the 1970s 300,000 Shia fled the PLO, with them largely being squeezed into Muslims areas within Beirut, from where they were further harassed and extorted by PLO gunmen.

The PLO soon began to encounter resistance from the Lebanese, in the south a mostly Christian group known as the Free Lebanon Army was formed to protect Southern Lebanon from the PLO. Shia resistance was initially passive and non-violent but the Iranian revolution spurred the Shia to more active resistance and clashes between the PLO and the Amal Movement soon spread across the Shia parts of Fatahland. Sunnis were slower to take up arms and their resistance was more limited to strikes and political activism but eventually armed resistance against the PLO but led clashes between pro-PLO leftists and Sunni forces in Tripoli.

=== International developments ===
In April 1981, the United States tried to broker a cease-fire in southern Lebanon among Israel, Syria and the PLO. In July 1981, Israel responded to PLO rocket attacks on northern Israeli settlements by bombing PLO encampments in southern Lebanon. United States envoy Philip Habib eventually negotiated a shaky cease-fire that was monitored by UNIFIL.

As Egypt and Israel began moving closer to a permanent peace Syria and the PLO, both of whom opposed peace, began to grow closer together and Syria ceased its attacks on the PLO. In January 1980 Syria withdrew from the coastal strip between Beirut and Sidon, transferring the control to the PLO instead of the Lebanese state. It supplied the PLO with equipment including tanks, and in April 1982 it signed a co-operation with Fatah, the largest group within the PLO.

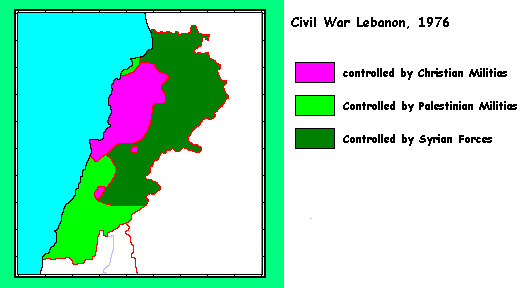
Map showing power balance in Lebanon, 1976: Dark Green – controlled by Syria: Purple – controlled by Maronite groups; Light Green – controlled by Palestinian militias

=== Israeli intervention and PLO expulsion ===
The 1982 Lebanon war began on 6 June 1982, when Israel invaded again in direct retaliation over the assassination attempt by ANO (Abu Nidal organization), a splinter group from Fatah) on Shlomo Argov, the Israeli ambassador to the UK, attacking Palestinian military bases and refugee camps affiliated with Palestine Liberation Organization and other Palestinian military movements, including the ANO. During the conflict, over 17,000 Lebanese were killed, and the Israeli army laid siege to Beirut. During the war, fighting also occurred between Israel and Syria. The United States, fearing a widening conflict and the prestige the siege was giving PLO leader Yasser Arafat, got all sides to agree to a cease-fire and terms for the PLO's withdrawal on 12 August. The predominantly Muslim Multinational Force in Lebanon arrived to keep the peace and ensure PLO withdrawal. Arafat retreated from Beirut on 30 August 1982 and settled in Tunisia.

== Aftermath ==
=== PLO's relocation to Tunisia after expulsion from Lebanon ===
The 1982 Israeli invasion in support of Lebanese Christian militias resulted in the Palestine Liberation Organization's (PLO) departure from Lebanon to Tunisia. The creation of Security Zone in South Lebanon has benefited civilian Israeli population as Galilee suffered lesser violent attacks (dozens civilians killed), than previously by PLO in the 1970s (hundreds of Israeli civilian casualties). The relocation of PLO bases to Tunisia resulted in deterioration of the Israeli-Tunisian ties, which had previously considered relatively tolerant.

=== Beginning of the Israel–Hezbollah conflict ===
Despite this Israeli success in eradicating PLO bases and partial withdraw in 1985, the Israeli invasion had actually increased the severity of conflict with local Lebanese militias and resulted in the consolidation of several local Shia Muslim movements in Lebanon, including Hezbollah and Amal, from a previously unorganized guerrilla movement in the south. Over the years, military casualties of both sides grew higher, as both parties used more modern weaponry, and Hezbollah progressed in its tactics. By the early 1990s, Hezbollah, with support from Syria and Iran, emerged as the leading group and military power, monopolizing the directorship of the guerrilla activity in South Lebanon.

== See also ==
- 1958 Lebanon crisis
- List of extrajudicial killings and political violence in Lebanon
- Cedar Revolution
- Hamas in Lebanon
- Israel–Hezbollah conflict (2023–present)
- List of modern conflicts in the Middle East
- Palestinian Fedayeen insurgency
- Syrian occupation of Lebanon

== Sources ==
- Meier, Daniel (2016). Shaping Lebanon's borderlands: armed resistance and international intervention in South Lebanon. Library of modern Middle East studies. London: I.B. Tauris. ISBN 978-1-78453-253-6.
- Laffin, John (1985). The War of Desperation Lebanon 1982-1985, Osprey Publishing Ltd
