= Kiryat Shmona massacre =

1974 attack by Palestinian militants in northern Israel

- Part of Palestinian insurgency in South Lebanon
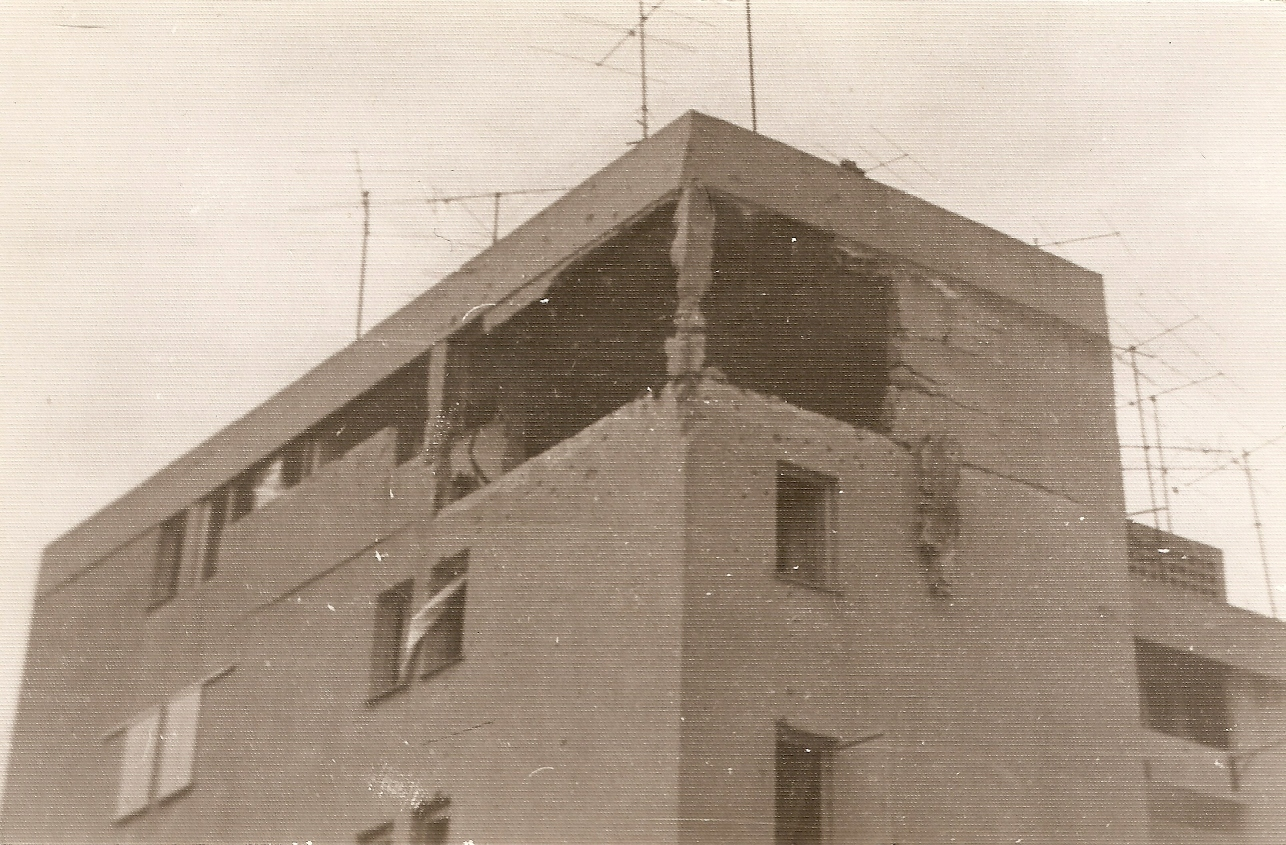
- The apartment building at 15 Yehuda Halevi Street in the aftermath of the attack

- The attack site
- Native name: הפיגוע בקריית שמונה
- Location: 33°12′56″N 35°34′04″E; Kiryat Shmona, Israel
- Date: 11 April 1974; 52 years ago
- Attack type: Shooting spree
- Deaths: 18 Israelis, including 8 children and 2 soldiers (+ 3 attackers)
- Injuries: 16 Israelis
- Perpetrator: PFLP-GC claimed responsibility
- No. of participants: 3

The Kiryat Shmona massacre was an attack by three members of the Popular Front for the Liberation of Palestine - General Command on civilians in Kiryat Shmona, Israel during the Jewish holiday of Passover on 11 April 1974. Eighteen people were killed, 8 of them children, and 16 people were wounded.

== Attack ==
Kiryat Shmona is an Israeli city near the Israel-Lebanon border. In the early morning on 11 April 1974, three members of the Popular Front for the Liberation of Palestine - General Command crossed the border from Lebanon into Israel. They first entered the Janusz Korczak elementary school, but the classrooms were empty due to Jewish holiday of Passover. The attackers went undetected for over an hour. They then crossed the street and entered an apartment building at 13 Yehuda Halevi Street.

The attackers killed a number of residents at the apartment building before moving to the building next door, 15 Yehuda Halevi. They first killed the building's gardener before climbing the staircase and shooting those they encountered. The three gunmen then barricaded themselves in an apartment on the top floor. In the exchange of gunfire with responding Israeli soldiers, the attackers' backpack of explosives was detonated, killing the three attackers.

According to Israeli police, the attackers were equipped with rocket-propelled grenades (RPGs) and threw children from the top floor of the building.

Eighteen people were killed, 8 of them children. Two of the slain Israelis were soldiers, and the rest were civilians. Another 16 were wounded.

A splinter Palestinian group claimed credit for what it called a "suicide attack" via a telephone statement to the media. The group claimed the goal of the attack was the release of 100 fighters from Israeli prisons.

== Reactions ==
Israeli Foreign Minister Abba Eban expressed disappointment in the Egyptian media's reaction to the attack, after Israeli hopes that the Israel-Egypt Disengagement Treaty of 1974 meant "a new wind of change blowing from Cairo."

The Representative Council of Jews of France (CRIF) blamed a perceived policy of weakness and abandonment from the West, including France. François Mitterrand sent a condolence telegram to Israeli Prime Minister Golda Meir for the "criminal aggression which once again has struck innocent civilian victims."

== Aftermath ==
About 40% of the town's residents left after the massacre. On 13 April, Israeli forces carried out retaliatory raids in Lebanon, hours after the victims were buried. Only after Israel's reprisal raid in southern Lebanon did France simultaneously condemn the massacre.

More attacks on northern Israel followed by Palestinian militants, including the Ma'alot massacre the same year, the Savoy Hotel attack and Kfar Yuval hostage crisis in 1975, and multiple airplane hijacking acts, the most notable being Entebbe Operation in 1976.

According to The Times of Israel, by 2023, almost 50 years after the attack, it had largely faded from Israeli consciousness. That year, Lisa Peretz, Robby Elmaliah and Ilanit Baumann premiered their film "A Haunted Home" about the events and the lasting trauma on residents of Kiryat Shmona at the Jerusalem Film Festival. According to survivors interviewed by the filmmakers, the apparent lack of interest in preserving the memory of the incident is because the victims were mostly poor Mizrahi Jews who lived in an out-of-the-way location. Another reason was that survivors were too traumatized to speak publicly about the events. Elmaliah speculated: "I think one of the reasons why this event isn’t covered — and not just not covered, but barred, hidden… I think it’s mostly because there is no story of bravery here. There are no heroes in this story… there’s nobody who saved anybody. Ultimately, 18 people were killed, and the soldiers entered the building at the end."

== See also ==
- List of massacres in Israel
- Palestinian political violence
