= Popular Front for the Liberation of Palestine – General Command =

Syrian-based Palestinian nationalist organisation

- الجبهة الشعبية لتحرير فلسطين – القيادة العامة
- Founding leader: Ahmed Jibril #
- Leader: Talal Naji
- Secretary of the Political Bureau: Anwar Raja
- Dates active: 1968–present
- Split from: Popular Front for the Liberation of Palestine
- Headquarters: Damascus, Syria
- Ideology: Anti-Zionism; Arab nationalism Palestinian nationalism Marxism; Secularism; Socialism; One-state solution
- Political position: Left-wing to far-left (Note: Other Palestinian leftist groups like the PFLP have claimed that the founder and long-time leader of the party, Ahmed Jibril, was closer to the extreme-right.)
- Size: 500–1,000 (2004); 800 (2019)
- Part of: National affiliation: Palestine Liberation Organization; Alliance of Palestinian Forces; International affiliation: Axis of Resistance
- Wars: Palestinian insurgency in South Lebanon; South Lebanon conflict (1985–2000); Iran–Israel proxy conflict Syrian civil war Syrian civil war spillover in Lebanon; Gaza war

The Popular Front for the Liberation of Palestine – General Command (Arabic: الجبهة الشعبية لتحرير فلسطين – القيادة العامة, romanized: al-Jabhah al-Shaʻbīyah li-Taḥrīr Filasṭīn – al-Qiyādah al-ʻĀmmah) or PFLP-GC is a Palestinian nationalist militant organisation based in Syria. It is a member of the Palestine Liberation Organization (PLO).

It was founded in 1968 by Ahmed Jibril after splitting from the Popular Front for the Liberation of Palestine (PFLP) based on ideological and internal disputes. In the 1970s and 1980s it was involved in the Palestinian insurgency in South Lebanon and launched a number of attacks against Israeli soldiers and civilians; including the Avivim school bus massacre (1970), the bombing of Swissair Flight 330 (1970), the Kiryat Shmona massacre (1974) and the Night of the Gliders (1987).

Since the late 1980s PFLP-GC had been largely inactive in military activities, but re-emerged during the Syrian Civil War (2011–2024) fighting on the side of the Ba'athist regime in Syria.

The group has a paramilitary wing called the Jihad Jibril Brigades. It has been designated a terrorist organization by Canada, the UK, Japan, the US, and European Union.

== Background ==
Jibril joined with George Habash in 1967 as more or less an equal partner in the PFLP leadership. When he quickly tired of the group's lack of field initiative, he was therefore still able to leave while retaining a significant retainer of his previous supporters. One of his most hated enemies within the group, Naif Hawatmeh, unintentionally provided him with the pretext: While Jibril wrestled with Habash over why the Popular Front was so dependent on theoretical discussion rather than armed struggle, Hawatmeh tried to influence the PFLP in the direction of an ideology as leftist as possible.

Jibril decided that Hawatmeh's theorizing was chafing the PFLP and producing an organization of impotent intellectuals, and declared as such when he formed the General Command. Habash, he stated, had become a puppet to the professors of the exile, the elite among the refugees who were well-educated and wealthy, yet preached class revolution to the masses in the camps.

In July 2021, Talal Naji succeeded Jibril as the secretary-general of the PFLP-GC.

== History ==
=== Formation ===
The PFLP-GC was founded in 1968 as a Syrian-backed splinter group from the Popular Front for the Liberation of Palestine (PFLP). It was headed by Secretary-General Ahmed Jibril, also known by the kunya "Abu Jihad" (not to be confused with Khalil al-Wazir, the head of Fatah's armed wing who used the same nom de guerre), a former military officer in the Syrian Army who had been one of the PFLP's early leaders. The PFLP-GC declared that its primary focus would be military, not political, complaining that the PFLP had been devoting too much time and resources to Marxist philosophizing.

Although the group was initially a member of the Palestine Liberation Organization (PLO), it always opposed Yasser Arafat and opposes any political settlement with Israel; for this reason, it has never participated in the peace process. The PFLP-GC left the PLO in 1974 to join the Rejectionist Front, protesting what they saw as the PLO's move towards an accommodation with Israel in the Arafat-backed Ten Point Program of the Palestinian National Council (PNC). Unlike most of the organizations involved in the Rejectionist Front, the PFLP-GC never resumed its role within the PLO.

From the start, the PFLP-GC was more concentrated on means than ends. They never depended on a political platform; most of their recruits were young, exiled, poor, illiterate, and angry. The General Command promised a gun in every hand, and the means to write their own narrative rather than read and praise those of others as the better off exiles did in universities in Europe.

Jibril still used iron discipline to keep his fighters loyal and professional, and the General Command's insurgents were as a result for decades considered the best trained of any of the Palestinian guerrilla groups. What may have helped Jibril was Hawatmeh's own 1969 defection from the PFLP to form the Popular Democratic Front for the Liberation of Palestine (PDFLP, later without the "Popular"), after Habash tried to compensate for some of the problems that had caused Jibril's exit.

=== 1970s and 1980s ===
In the 1970s and 1980s, the group carried out a number of attacks on Israeli soldiers and civilians, and gained notoriety for using spectacular means. After 1969 Habash could no longer claim that he was the head of the true organization, as all three of the group's original triumvirate were now separate. Nevertheless, due to the PFLP's successful terrorist attacks on Israel, including the Dawson's Field hijackings (September 1970), Lod Airport Massacre (1971), and coordination with the Fatah-backed Black September group in the Munich Olympic killings ( 5–6 September 1972), Habash continued to be the first among equals among the Rejectionist Front, the groups that refused any permanent settlement in a framework other than military victory.

From 1970 to 1973, the group targeted a number of civilian aircraft; typically having members seduce single young women; often through both promises of a life of adventure and by getting them addicted to drugs, before asking them to carry what the "boyfriend" claimed to be some cash and a mysterious package onto a flight to Tel Aviv. While the girls assumed they were helping their "boyfriends" pass drugs, they were unknowingly carrying explosives.

On 21 February 1970, the group used its first barometric triggers to detonate two in-flight airliners nearly simultaneously: a Swissair flight to Tel Aviv that fell in Aargau Canton, killing 41, and an Austrian Airlines flight from Frankfurt to Tel Aviv, which actually failed to destroy the aircraft, which made an emergency landing. The PFLP-GC was also responsible for the Avivim school bus massacre in 1970 and the Kiryat Shmona massacre in 1974.

Jibril focused on carving out a stake of the PLO recruitment in Lebanese refugee camps. While Fatah absorbed enormous casualties in the 1982 Lebanon War, the General Command succeeded in surviving, and at the end retained most of its previous manpower.

In one of its most famous attacks, a PFLP-GC guerrilla landed a motorized hang glider (apparently supplied by Libya) near an Israeli army camp near Kiryat Shemona in Northern Israel on 25 November 1987. He succeeded to kill six soldiers and wounded several others, before being shot dead himself. The action has been seen by some as providing the catalyst for the eruption of the First Intifada. On 2 January 1988, nighttime Israeli airstrikes on Ain al-Hilweh killed three members of PFLP-GC. It was reported that the air raid was in response to the hang glider attack. PSP positions along the coast North of Sidon were also hit and three of their members killed. In total around twenty people were killed in the attack, including seven children and one woman. In the previous two years there had been about forty Israeli air strikes on Lebanon.

The PFLP-GC has not been involved in major attacks on Israeli targets since the early 1990s, but it reportedly cooperated with the Hezbollah guerrillas in South Lebanon.

Supporters of the Libyan convicted of the Lockerbie bombing have suggested the PFLP-GC was in fact responsible.

=== 1990s and 2000s ===
Following the rise of Hamas in the 1987–1991 First Intifada among Palestinians living in the West Bank and Gaza Strip, Jibril found an able ally in resisting the trend started by Fatah leader Yasser Arafat toward a negotiated settlement to the Israeli–Palestinian conflict. By that time, the Rejectionist Front was composed primarily of leftist groups, among them the PFLP, DFLP, General Command, PLF, and numerous other small factions. However, the members of these PLO groups were limited in their ability to confront Fatah, which never lost its supremacy within the umbrella organization. The only group that waged uninterrupted attrition against Arafat was the Fatah Revolutionary Council led by maverick hardliner Sabri al-Banna (better known as Abu Nidal), who was viewed by other Palestinian organizations as not so much a guerrilla as a pure criminal with no higher goal than deposing the moderates at the head of the PLO.

Though many Palestinians still were opposed to compromising on the principle of defeating Israel by armed struggle, the existing groups could not channel their desires, as many of them were led by the elite among the exile population, who were detached from the reality of the refugee camps, be they in the West Bank and Gaza, Lebanon, Syria, or Jordan. Many leaders of Palestinian groups lived in luxurious accommodations throughout the Eastern Bloc, Europe, or various Arab states, especially Syria, Iraq, and Libya. Jibril uniquely insisted on living in a specially designed security bunker in the Lebanon mountains, a hilly terrain that was more attuned to the image of a guerrilla leader than Arafat's mansions in Tunis.

With the emergence of Hamas and the Islamic Jihad throughout the 1980s, Jibril proved more able to cope than Habash and his other allies in the Rejectionist Front. This was enabled by a factor that had nothing to do with his abilities or beliefs: While Habash was a Greek Orthodox and Hawatmeh a Greek Catholic Christian, Jibril was a Muslim.

Throughout the 1980s the General Command actively cooperated with the nascent Hezbollah paramilitary group (made mostly of Shia Muslims) dedicated to armed struggle against Israel, as well as with Syria and Iran, both of whom fund and arm Hamas and the Palestinian Islamic Jihad. In the mid-1990s, Jibril held conferences with these groups in Tehran and Damascus in order to achieve tighter coordination of activities, though his organization remained small and its own actions were more concerned with aiding Hezbollah and achieving an Israeli withdrawal from southern Lebanon. The Israelis never forgot Jibril's spectacular exploits, especially the Night of the Hang Gliders, and used a variety of operations to try and kill him, none successfully, although his son and heir Jihad Ahmed Jibril was assassinated by a car bomb on 20 May 2002, with the identity of the assassins unknown. Due to these activities, the General Command is regarded as the most hard-line of the old insurgent groups, and currently resists the Oslo Accords from its bases in Syria and Lebanon.

=== Syrian Civil War and the 2023 Gaza war ===
PFLP-GC leader Jibril was a staunch ally of Syrian President Bashar al-Assad. On 5 June 2011, a number of Yarmouk residents were shot dead while protesting at the Israeli border. Allegedly angered by the PFLP-GC's refusal to take part in the protests and seen as the Assad regime's enforcer in the camp, thousands of mourners burnt down its headquarters in Yarmouk. PFLP-GC members fired on the crowd, killing 14 Palestinians and wounding 43.

In 2012, the PFLP-FC supported the Syrian Army to fight the Syrian rebels in and around Yarmouk, working with the shabiha militias to besiege the camp. On 3 August 2012, 21 civilians were killed when the Syrian Army shelled Yarmouk. Palestinian president Mahmoud Abbas condemned the Syrian Army for shelling the camp and chided the PFLP-GC for dragging Palestinians into the conflict.

On 5 December 2012, fighting erupted in Yarmouk between the Syrian Army and PFLP-GC on one side, and Syrian rebels on the other. The rebels included the Free Syrian Army (FSA) and a group made up of Palestinians, called Liwa al-Asifa or Storm Brigade. By 17 December, the rebels had won control of Yarmouk. Afterwards, Government and rebel representatives agreed that all armed groups should withdraw from Yarmouk and leave it as a neutral zone. The agreement also said that the PFLP-GC should be dismantled and its weapons surrendered. However, a spokesman for the pro-rebel Palestine Refugee Camp Network said, "the implementation of the truce has been problematic" because of "intermittent" government shelling of Yarmouk and clashes on its outskirts.

Many PFLP-GC fighters reportedly defected to the rebels. One PFLP-GC commander said "I felt that we became soldiers for the Assad regime, not guards for the camps, so I decided to defect". He claimed that government forces stood by and watched as the PFLP-GC fought the rebels, without helping the Palestinians. Ahmed Jibril reportedly fled Damascus for the Mediterranean city of Tartous. Palestinian left-wing groups—including the Popular Front for the Liberation of Palestine (PFLP), the biggest Palestinian leftist group—berated Jibril and the PFLP-GC. One PFLP official said "Everyone knows the true size of PFLP-GC. They are not representative of the Palestinians". Another said that Jibril "does not even belong to the Palestinian Left. He is closer to the extremist right-wing groups than to revolutionary leftist ones". On 18 December, the Palestinian National Council (PNC) denounced Jibril, saying it would expel him over his role in the conflict.

Despite being based in Syria, the PFLP-GC participated in fighting inside the Gaza Strip during the Gaza war from 2023, on the side of Hamas and allied Palestinian factions.

After the fall of the Assad regime in 2024, the Syrian transitional government demanded that all Palestinian armed groups in Syria disarm themselves, dissolve their military formations, and instead focus on political and charitable work. Representatives of the new Syrian government also raided the offices of the PFLP-GC, Fatah al-Intifada, and as-Sa'iqa, confiscating documents, equipment, and weapons. From 21 to 24 December, the Lebanese Armed Forces peacefully occupied most of the PFLP-GC's remaining bases in Lebanon, mainly those at the villages of Sultan Yacoub and Hechmech. This left only a base in the town of Naameh under the party's control, though it had reportedly offered to surrender its remaining weaponry to the Lebanese military. The new Syrian government ultimately allowed the PFLP-GC to continue its political activities in Syria, while the party reorganized its leadership including suspending Khaled Jibril's membership in the central committee. In February 2025, the party announced the election of Anwar Raja and Ramez Mustafa as new assistant secretary-generals. This sparked protests in Yarmouk Camp as locals argued that Anwar Raja had been the "'planner and mastermind' of the siege and violations" which had taken place at Yarmouk Camp over the previous years, particularly in 2012. In June 2025, the Syrian government 'temporarily' closed all offices of the General Command, as part of its efforts to control Palestinian factions.

== International relations of PFLP-GC ==
=== Lebanon ===
Its role in Lebanon after the Syrian Army Left Lebanon in 2005 (see Cedar Revolution) is uncertain, and it has been involved in a number of clashes with Lebanese security forces. In late October 2005, the Lebanese Army surrounded camps of the PFLP-GC in a tense standoff, after Lebanese authorities claimed that the PFLP-GC was receiving Syrian arms across the border. The group has come under fierce criticism within Lebanon, accused of acting on Syria's behalf to stir up unrest.

=== Syria ===
At the beginning of the Syrian Civil War in 2011, the PFLP-GC was an ally of the Ba'ath Party-led government of Syria. The PFLP-GC was based in Yarmouk Camp – a district of Damascus that is home to the biggest community of Palestinian refugees in Syria. Several members of the PFLP-GC's central committee opposed this alliance with the Assad government and resigned in protest.

=== Designations of PFLP-GC as a terrorist organization ===
Country	Date	References
European Union		
Canada		
United Kingdom	June 2014	
Japan	2002	
United States	8 October 1997	

== See also ==
- List of armed groups in the Syrian Civil War
- Jibril Agreement
- Popular Front for the Liberation of Palestine
- Popular Front for the Liberation of Palestine – External Operations
- Popular Front for the Liberation of Palestine – Special Command
- Democratic Front for the Liberation of Palestine
