= List of United Nations resolutions relating to Lebanon =

The following is a list of United Nations Security Council resolutions relating to Lebanon.

== List of resolutions ==
| # | Date | Subject |
|---|---|---|
| 50 | May 29, 1948 | The Palestine Question |
| 72 | August 11, 1949 | The Palestine Question |
| 128 | June 11, 1958 | Complaint by Lebanon |
| 129 | August 7, 1958 | Complaint by Lebanon |
| 262 | December 31, 1968 | The situation in the Middle East |
| 270 | August 26, 1969 | The situation in the Middle East |
| 279 | May 12, 1970 | The situation in the Middle East |
| 280 | May 19, 1970 | The situation in the Middle East |
| 285 | September 5, 1970 | The situation in the Middle East |
| 313 | February 28, 1972 | The situation in the Middle East |
| 316 | June 26, 1972 | The situation in the Middle East |
| 317 | July 21, 1972 | The situation in the Middle East |
| 332 | April 21, 1973 | The situation in the Middle East |
| 337 | August 15, 1973 | On Seizure of a Lebanese Airliner |
| 347 | April 24, 1974 | Israel-Lebanon |
| 425 | March 19, 1978 | Israel-Lebanon |
| 426 | March 19, 1978 | Israel-Lebanon |
| 427 | May 3, 1978 | Israel-Lebanon |
| 434 | September 18, 1978 | Israel-Lebanon |
| 436 | October 6, 1978 | Lebanon |
| 444 | January 19, 1978 | Israel-Lebanon |
| 450 | June 14, 1979 | Israel-Lebanon |
| 459 | December 19, 1979 | Israel-Lebanon |
| 467 | April 24, 1980 | Israel-Lebanon |
| 474 | June 17, 1980 | Israel-Lebanon |
| 481 | November 26, 1980 | Israel-Syrian Arab Republic |
| 483 | December 18, 1980 | Israel-Lebanon |
| 488 | June 19, 1981 | Israel-Lebanon |
| 490 | July 21, 1981 | Lebanon |
| 498 | December 21, 1981 | Israel-Lebanon |
| 501 | February 25, 1982 | Israel-Lebanon |
| 508 | June 5, 1982 | Israel-Lebanon |
| 509 | June 6, 1982 | Israel-Lebanon |
| 511 | June 18, 1982 | Israel-Lebanon |
| 512 | June 19, 1982 | Lebanon |
| 513 | July 4, 1982 | Lebanon |
| 515 | July 29, 1982 | Lebanon |
| 516 | August 1, 1982 | Israel-Lebanon |
| 517 | August 4, 1982 | Israel-Lebanon |
| 518 | August 12, 1982 | Israel-Lebanon |
| 519 | August 17, 1982 | Israel-Lebanon |
| 520 | September 17, 1982 | Israel-Lebanon |
| 521 | September 19, 1982 | Israel-Lebanon |
| 523 | October 18, 1982 | Israel-Lebanon |
| 1559 | September 2 2004 | Hezbollah-Lebanon |
| 1701 | August 11, 2006 | Israel-Lebanon |
| 2650 | August 31, 2022 | Lebanon |
| 2695 | August 31, 2023 | Lebanon |
| 2749 | August 28, 2024 | Lebanon |

== See also ==
- Category:United Nations Security Council resolutions concerning Lebanon
