= United Nations Security Council Resolution 518 =

UN Security Council Resolution 518
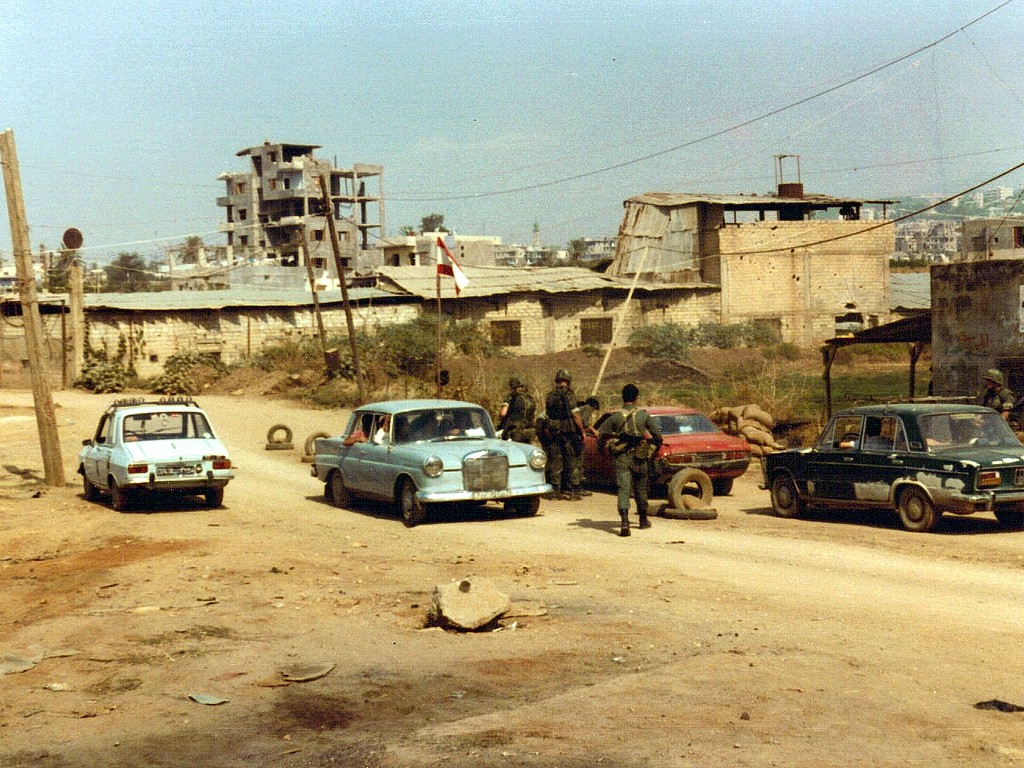
- Checkpoint near Beirut (1982)
- Date: 12 August 1982
- Meeting no.: 2,392
- Code: S/RES/518 (Document)
- Subject: Israel–Lebanon
- Voting summary: 15 voted for; None voted against; None abstained
- Result: Adopted

Security Council composition
- Permanent members: China; France; Soviet Union; United Kingdom; United States
- Non-permanent members: Guyana; Ireland; Jordan; Japan; Panama; Poland; Spain; Togo; Uganda; Zaire

United Nations Security Council resolution 518, adopted unanimously on 12 August 1982, after recalling resolutions 508 (1982), 509 (1982), 512 (1982), 513 (1982), 515 (1982), 516 (1982) and 517 (1982), the council again demanded that Israel and all other parties strictly observe the resolutions of the Security Council placed on them.

Resolution 518 continued by demanding the immediate lifting of all restrictions on the city of Beirut to permit free entry to humanitarian assistance. The resolution then requested the secretary-general to report back on the implementation of Resolution 518 as soon as possible.

== See also ==
- 1982 Lebanon War
- Blue Line
- Green Line, Beirut
- Israeli–Lebanese conflict
- List of United Nations Security Council Resolutions 501 to 600 (1982–1987)
- Siege of Beirut
