= United Nations Security Council Resolution 517 =

UN Security Council Resolution 517
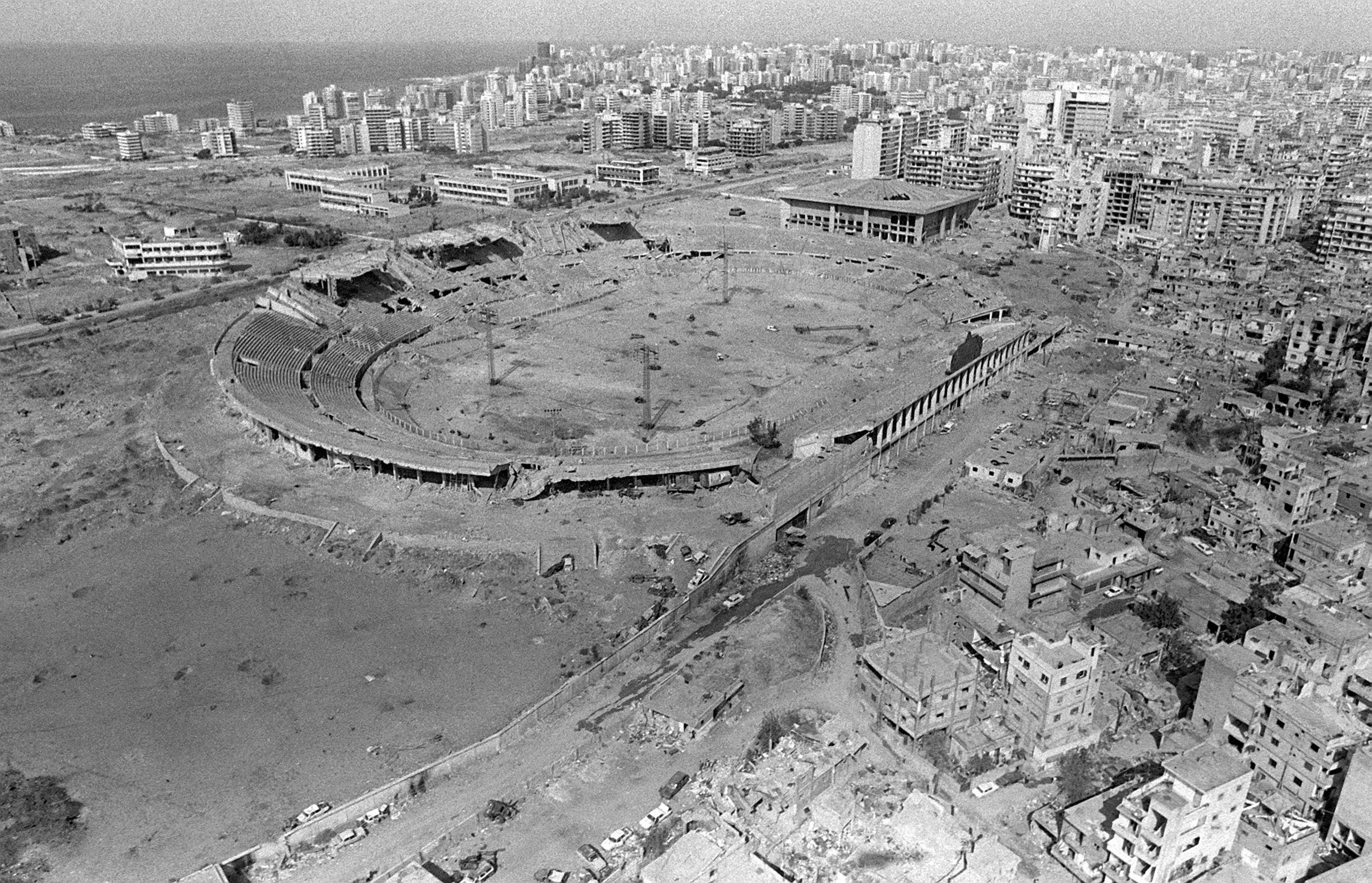
- Stadium used as ammunition storage for the PLO in Beirut (1982)
- Date: 4 August 1982
- Meeting no.: 2,389
- Code: S/RES/517 (Document)
- Subject: Israel–Lebanon
- Voting summary: 14 voted for; None voted against; 1 abstained
- Result: Adopted

Security Council composition
- Permanent members: China; France; Soviet Union; United Kingdom; United States
- Non-permanent members: Guyana; Ireland; Jordan; Japan; Panama; Poland; Spain; Togo; Uganda; Zaire

United Nations Security Council resolution 517, adopted on 4 August 1982, after recalling resolutions 508 (1982), 509 (1982), 512 (1982), 513 (1982), 515 (1982) and 516 (1982), the council again demanded an immediate cessation of military activities between Israel and Lebanon, and the withdrawal of Israeli forces from Lebanese territory.

The resolution then took note of the Palestine Liberation Organization's (PLO) decision to move its forces from Beirut, and requested the secretary-general to report back on the situation no later than 1000 hours (ET).

The resolution was adopted by 14 votes to none, with one abstention from the United States.

== See also ==
- 1982 Lebanon War
- Blue Line
- Green Line, Beirut
- Israeli–Lebanese conflict
- List of United Nations Security Council Resolutions 501 to 600 (1982–1987)
- Siege of Beirut
