= United Nations Security Council Resolution 523 =

UN Security Council Resolution 523
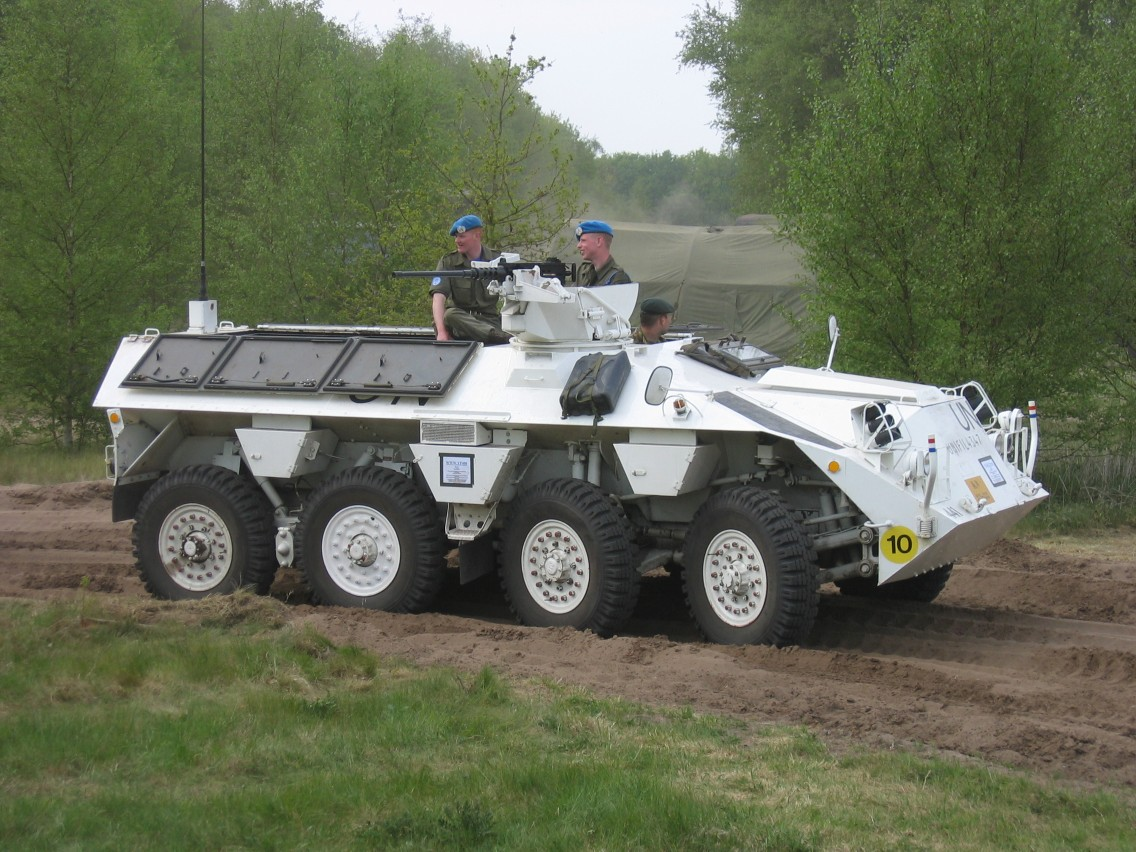
- UNIFIL personnel
- Date: 18 October 1982
- Meeting no.: 2,400
- Code: S/RES/523 (Document)
- Subject: Israel–Lebanon
- Voting summary: 13 voted for; None voted against; 2 abstained
- Result: Adopted

Security Council composition
- Permanent members: China; France; Soviet Union; United Kingdom; United States
- Non-permanent members: Guyana; Ireland; Jordan; Japan; Panama; Poland; Spain; Togo; Uganda; Zaire

United Nations Security Council resolution 523, adopted on 18 October 1982, after recalling resolutions 425 (1978), 426 (1978), 508 (1982), 509 (1982) and 519 (1982), as well as studying the report by the Secretary-General on the United Nations Interim Force in Lebanon (UNIFIL), the Council decided to extend the mandate of UNIFIL until 19 January 1983.

The resolution insisted that there should no be interference in the operations of the Force, which is now authorised to carry out humanitarian tasks under Resolution 511 (1982). The Council then requested the Secretary-General to report back on the situation within three months after consultations with the Government of Lebanon.

Resolution 523 was adopted by 13 votes to none, with two abstentions from the People's Republic of Poland and Soviet Union.

== See also ==
- 1982 Lebanon War
- Israeli–Lebanese conflict
- Lebanese Civil War
- List of United Nations Security Council Resolutions 501 to 600 (1982–1987)
