= United Nations Security Council Resolution 520 =

United Nations Security Council resolution

UN Security Council Resolution 520
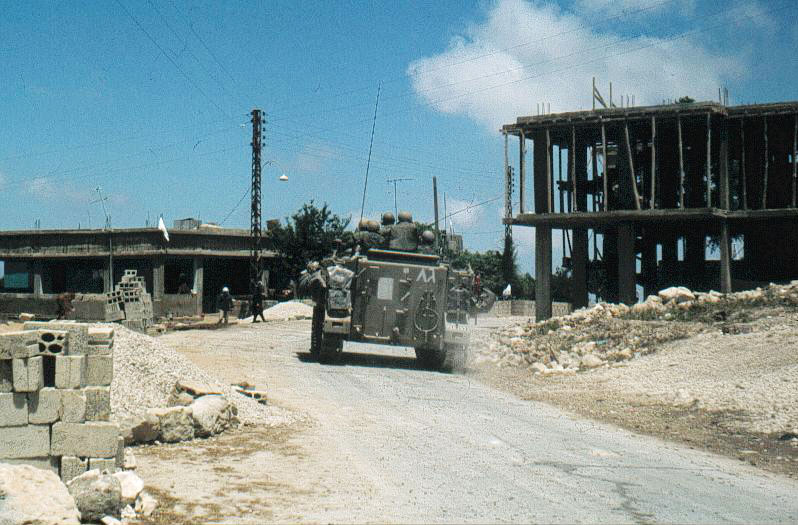
- Israeli troops in southern Lebanon
- Date: 17 September 1982
- Meeting no.: 2,395
- Code: S/RES/520 (Document)
- Subject: Israel–Lebanon
- Voting summary: 15 voted for; None voted against; None abstained
- Result: Adopted

Security Council composition
- Permanent members: China; France; Soviet Union; United Kingdom; United States
- Non-permanent members: Guyana; Ireland; Jordan; Japan; Panama; Poland; Spain; Togo; Uganda; Zaire

United Nations Security Council resolution 520, adopted unanimously on 17 September 1982, after the assassination of Lebanese President Bashir Gemayel and reaffirming resolutions 508 (1982), 509 (1982) and 516 (1982), the Council demanded that Israel withdraw immediately from Lebanon, and that Lebanese sovereignty be respected in order to restore a stable government in Lebanon.

The resolution went on to demand the return of positions occupied by Israel before 15 September 1982, as a first step towards the full implementation of the resolution. It also reaffirmed resolutions 512 (1982) and 513 (1982) which call for respect for the rights of the civilian populations without any discrimination and repudiates all acts of violence against those populations.

The Council supported the efforts of the Secretary-General to implement Security Council resolution 516 (1982) concerning the deployment of United Nations observers to monitor the situation in and around Beirut, requesting all the parties concerned to co-operate fully in the application of that resolution. Finally, it also requested the Secretary-General keep the Council informed on developments as soon as possible and not later than twenty-four hours.

== See also ==
- 1982 Lebanon War
- Cedar Revolution
- Israeli–Lebanese conflict
- Lebanese Civil War
- List of United Nations Security Council Resolutions 501 to 600 (1982–1987)
- Syrian occupation of Lebanon
- United Nations Interim Force in Lebanon
