= France–Lebanon relations =

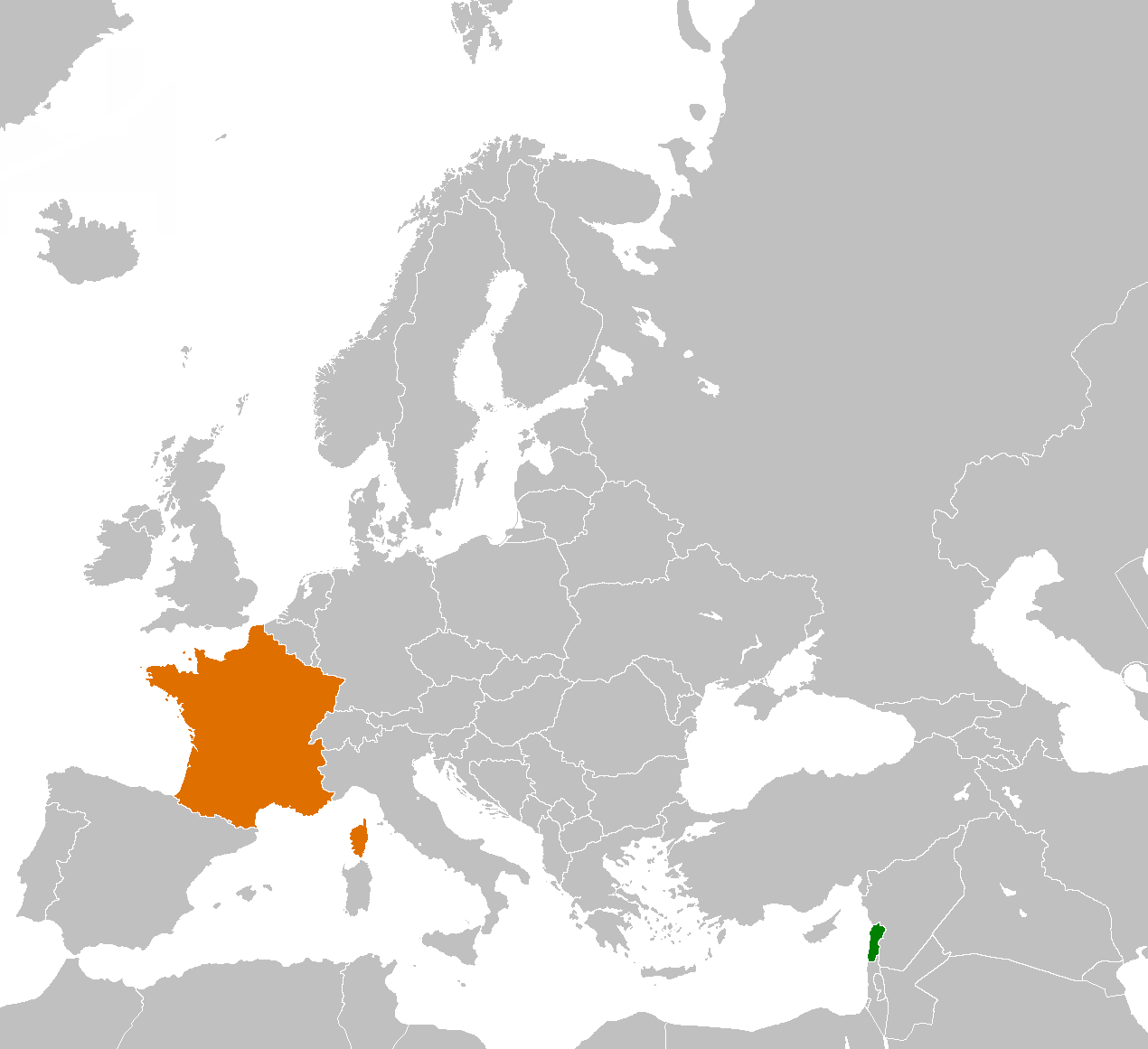
- Lebanon: France

Diplomatic mission
- Embassy of France, Beirut: Embassy of Lebanon, Paris

France–Lebanon relations (French: Relations France-Liban; Arabic: العلاقات الفرنسية اللبنانية, romanized: al-ʻAlāqāt al-Faransīyah al-Lubnānīyah) are the international relations between France and Lebanon. France and Lebanon enjoy friendly relations, and France has often provided support to the Lebanese. Lebanon was a part of the French Mandate for Syria and the Lebanon prior to independence. The French language remains widely spoken throughout Lebanon, being taught as well as used as a medium education in many Lebanese schools, and both countries are members of the Francophonie.

== History ==
=== Early Relations ===
At the end of the 11th century, Lebanon became a part of the Frankish Crusader states, the north being incorporated into the County of Tripoli, the south into the Kingdom of Jerusalem. The Maronite Church, whose isolation had previously precluded contact with Rome, affirmed papal supremacy while keeping its own patriarch and liturgy.

Despite the strong fortresses of the Crusaders, such as the Citadel of Tripoli, Beaufort Castle, Mseilha Fort, or the Sidon Sea Castle, a Muslim reconquest of Lebanon began, under the leadership of Egypt, with the fall of Beirut to the sultan Saladin in 1187. Mongol raids against the Bekaa valley were defeated. Lebanon became part of the Mamluk state of Egypt and Syria in the 1280s and ’90s and was divided between several provinces.

In 1649, thanks to the successful mission of Archbishop Ishaq al-Shidrawi to the French court, the Maronites in Lebanon were placed under French protection and a French vice consulate established in Beirut. When in 1700 Maronite patriarch appealed to the French government to intervene on behalf of the Maronites of Lebanon, the ambassador to the Sublime Porte reminded the Ottoman government of France's protection and the Maronite patriarchs gained some independence from the Ottoman sultan. The success of the Lebanese Council of 1736 is also partially owed to the French Consol M. Martin who was able to pressure the local families not to involve themselves in the synod.

In 1860, with Lebanon still under Ottoman rule, France intervened militarily in the civil conflict between Christians and Druze in Mount Lebanon, after Ottoman troops had been aiding local Druze and Muslim forces by either direct support or by disarming Christian forces. This French support, later joined by Austrian, British, Prussian and Russian support, led to the adoption of the Organic Regulation between 1860 and 1864, and the creation of the Mount Lebanon Mutasarrifate, providing more independence to the Maronites.

The Mutasarrifate era, coinciding with the Nahda period, was characterized by the spread of Lebanese national consciousness, science and culture among the Lebanese, for many reasons, including: the spread of missions and schools in numerous villages, towns and cities, and the opening of two large universities that are still among the oldest and most prestigious universities in the Middle East: the Syrian Evangelical College, which became the American University of Beirut, and Saint Joseph University.

=== French Mandate ===
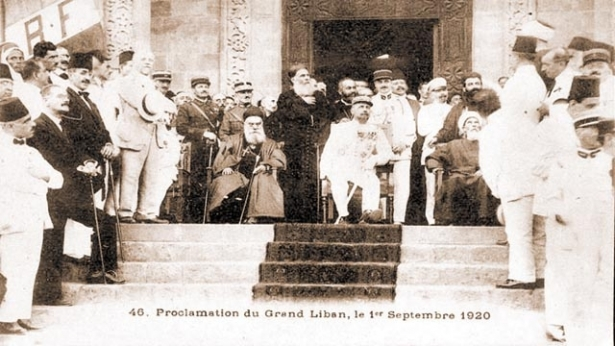
Commander of the French Army in the Levant, General Henri Gouraud attending the Proclamation of the state of Greater Lebanon in Beirut, along with Grand Mufti of Beirut Sheikh Mustafa Naja, and on his right is the Maronite Patriarch Elias Peter Hoayek; September 1920.

In 1920, soon after the end of World War I, the League of Nations mandated that Lebanon would be administered by France after the Partition of the Ottoman Empire. Lebanon officially became part of the French empire, as part of the French Mandate for Syria and Lebanon, and was administered from Beirut. Lebanon was not a “colony” of France. Rather, it was part of and administered by France. Lebanese people could ask for French citizenship and were treated as equal to French nationals. From November 1929 to November 1931, Charles de Gaulle was posted as General Staff of the Levant Troops in Beirut.

During World War II, Lebanon was initially administered by Vichy France. By 1942, the territory came under Free France. In August of that same year, General De Gaulle returned to Lebanon to meet with the occupying British forces who had entered the territory to prevent German advances into the Levant. In March 1943, using the 1932 census, France distributed seats in the Lebanese parliament on a ratio of six-to-five in favor of Christians. This was later extended to other public offices. The president was to be a Maronite Christian, the prime minister a Sunni Muslim, and the Speaker of the Chamber of Deputies a Shia Muslim. In January 1944, France agreed to transfer power to the Lebanese government, thus granting the territory independence.

However France at first denied Lebanon's independence and arrested Lebanese Political Leaders including the Lebanese President who were in opposition of the French mandate however under Lebanese and international pressure France released them. In 1946 after the Levant Crisis France fully left Lebanon

=== Lebanese Civil War ===
During the Lebanese Civil War, France was an active member in the creation of the United Nations Interim Force in Lebanon and voted in favor of numerous UN Resolutions regarding Lebanon such as Resolution 501, Resolution 508, Resolution 511, Resolution 511, Resolution 594 and Resolution 599. France was also a member of the Multinational Force in Lebanon and in 1982, during Operation Épaulard I, headquartered from the Beirut Internal Airport, French Armed Forces and Paratroopers were sent to the coastal parts of West Beirut and the seaport to ensure peace in those regions. From 1982 to 1984, France was tasked with training the Lebanese Armed Forces. During that same period, France lost more than 89 soldiers out of which 58 French Paratroopers were killed in the 1983 Beirut barracks bombings.

=== Post civil war ===
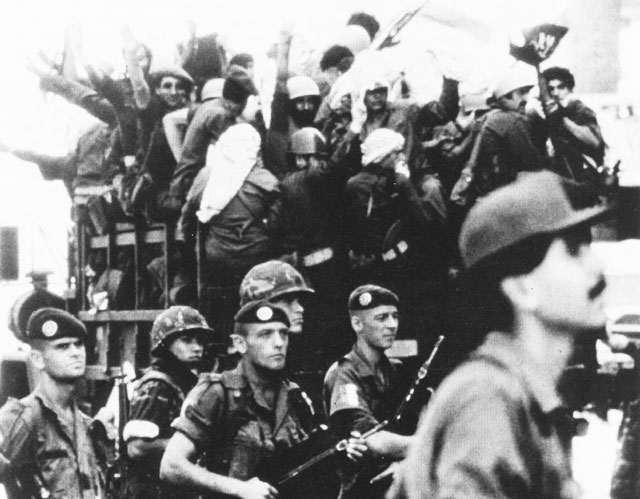
French legionnaires on guard during the evacuation of the PLO from Beirut; 1982.

After 1990, France continued to give Lebanon a modest military assistance. Since the end of the Lebanese civil war, relations between both nations have improved and strengthened. With regards to policy of cooperation and development between both nations, there are five main objectives: the consolidation of the rule of law, economic and social development, protection of the environment and heritage, university cooperation and research, cultural exchanges and the debate of ideas. There have been numerous high-level visits between leaders of both nations. After the Cedar Revolution in 2005, Syria withdrew its troops from the country. In April 2009, French and Lebanese officials approved the framework of a security agreement that besides improving bilateral relations include drugs and arms trafficking, illegal immigration and cyber-crime.

On 4 November 2017, Lebanese Prime Minister Saad Hariri resigned in a televised statement from Saudi Arabia, citing Iran's and Hezbollah's political over-extension in the Middle East region and fears of assassination. Later that month, with the intervention by French President Emmanuel Macron, Hariri was allowed to leave Saudi Arabia (where he also holds citizenship) and travelled to Paris. On 5 December 2017, Hariri rescinded his resignation and stated:

All (the government’s) political components decided to dissociate themselves from all conflicts, disputes, wars or the internal affairs of brother Arab countries, in order to preserve Lebanon’s economic and political relations.

French President Emmanuel Macron's intervention was aimed in part to put pressure on Saudi Arabia and Iran to desist from interference in Lebanon. Later on, President Macron visited Lebanon following the 2020 Beirut explosion.

== Migration ==
Since the French Mandate of Lebanon, several thousands Lebanese immigrated to France. Initially, most Lebanese people who migrated to France were Christians. Christians which were once a majority in Lebanon have left Lebanon especially during the Lebanese civil war. However, most of those who migrate from Lebanon to France are now Muslim. Many left Lebanon due to religious tension in the country, and due to the civil wars, Iranian influence in Lebanon through Hezbollah and its wars with Israel as well as invasion from Israel into the country. There are over 200,000 people of Lebanese origin currently residing in France today.

== Transportation ==
There are direct flights between France and Lebanon with the following airlines: Air France, Middle East Airlines and Transavia France.

== Trade ==
In 2016, trade between France and Lebanon totaled €934 million. France is one of Lebanon's main trading partners, and more than 4,500 French companies export to Lebanon. In 2015, French direct investment in Lebanon totaled €534 million. Nearly a hundred French companies operate in Lebanon in various sectors such as in the agricultural, telecommunications, retail, petroleum industry and financial services.

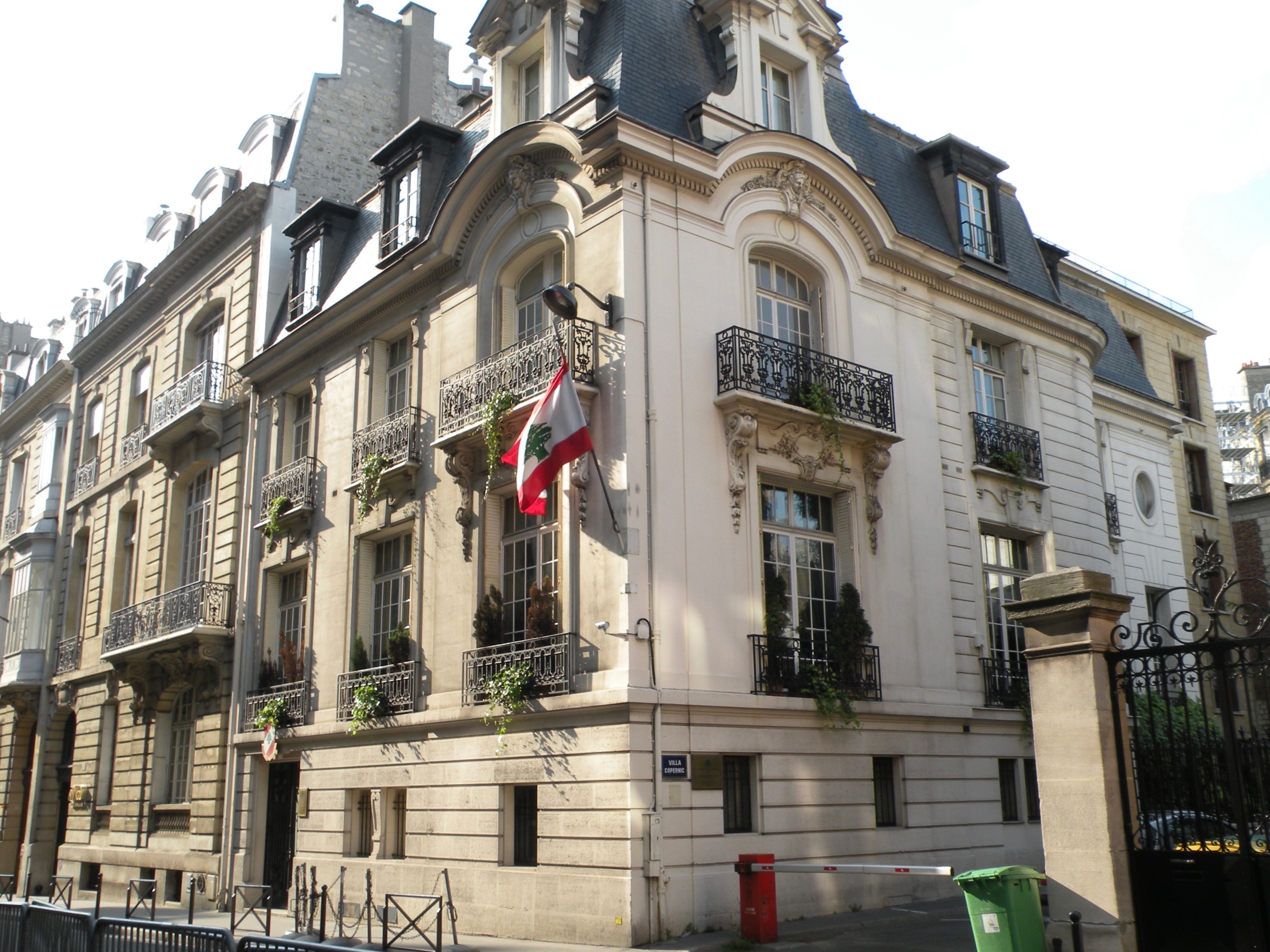
Embassy of Lebanon in Paris

== Resident diplomatic missions ==
- France has an embassy in Beirut.
- Lebanon has an embassy in Paris and a consulate-general in Marseille.

== See also ==
- French mandate of Lebanon
- French language in Lebanon
- French people in Lebanon
- Grand Lycée Franco-Libanais
- Lebanese people in France
- List of Ambassadors of France to Lebanon
- Lycée Franco-Libanais Habbouche-Nabatieh

== Bibliography ==
- Marc Baronnet, Les relations franco-libanaises, 1997, published in 2008 by Lulu.com, ISBN 978-1-84799-670-1.
- Moosa, Matti (2005). The Maronites in History. New York: Gorgias Press. ISBN 1-59333-182-7.
