= United Nations Security Council Resolution 516 =

UN Security Council Resolution 516
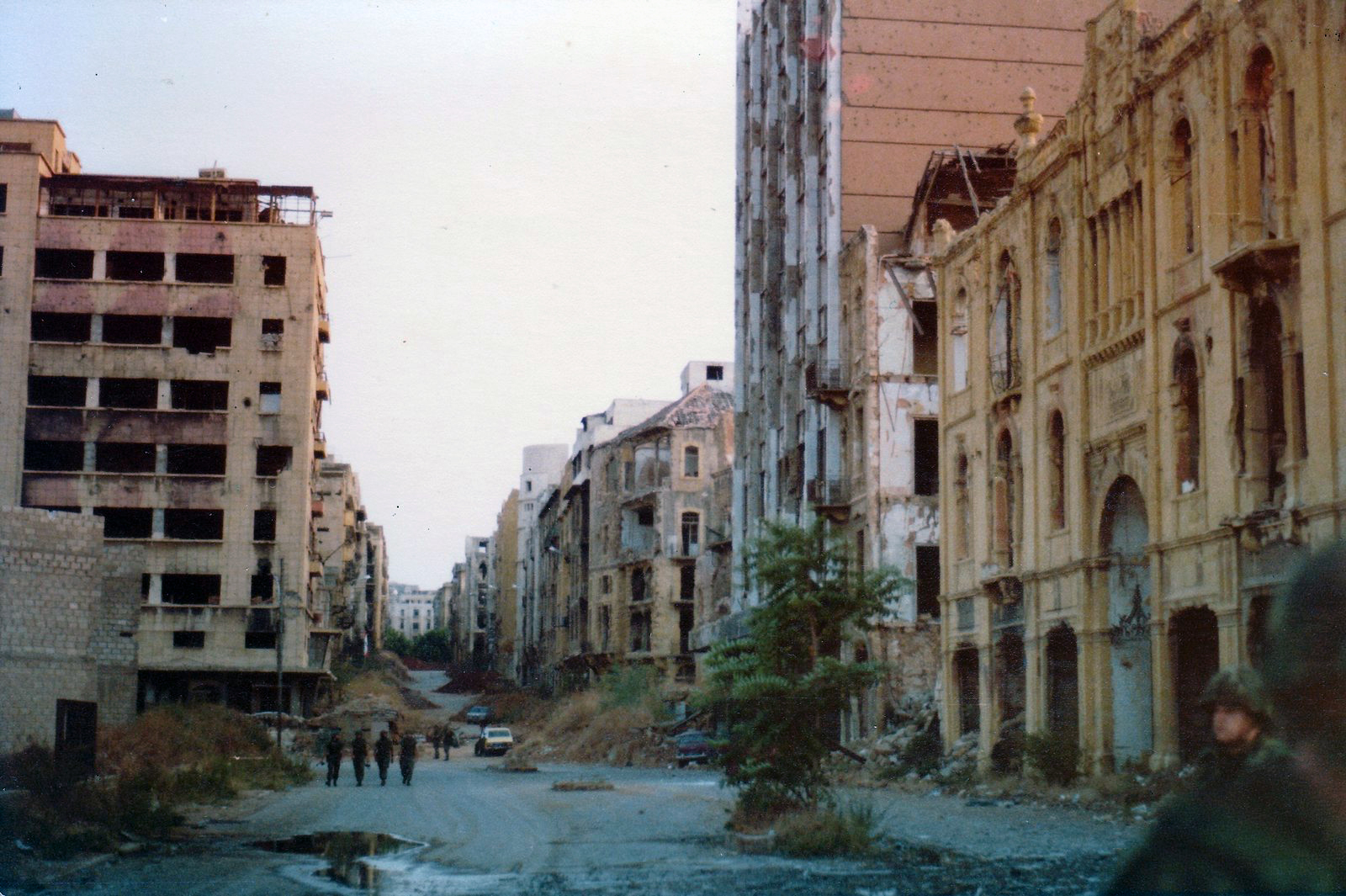
- Beirut (1982)
- Date: 1 August 1982
- Meeting no.: 2,386
- Code: S/RES/516 (Document)
- Subject: Israel–Lebanon
- Voting summary: 15 voted for; None voted against; None abstained
- Result: Adopted

Security Council composition
- Permanent members: China; France; Soviet Union; United Kingdom; United States
- Non-permanent members: Guyana; Ireland; Jordan; Japan; Panama; Poland; Spain; Togo; Uganda; Zaire

United Nations Security Council resolution 516, adopted on 1 August 1982, after recalling resolutions 508 (1982), 509 (1982), 512 (1982), 513 (1982) and 515 (1982), the council demanded an immediate cessation of military activities between Israel and Lebanon, noting the violations of the ceasefire in Beirut.

The resolution then authorised the secretary-general to deploy United Nations observers immediately in and around the Lebanese capital Beirut, and to report back on the situation no later than four hours from the adoption of this resolution.

== See also ==
- 1982 Lebanon War
- Blue Line
- Green Line, Beirut
- Israeli–Lebanese conflict
- List of United Nations Security Council Resolutions 501 to 600 (1982–1987)
- Siege of Beirut
