= United Nations Security Council Resolution 521 =

UN Security Council Resolution 521
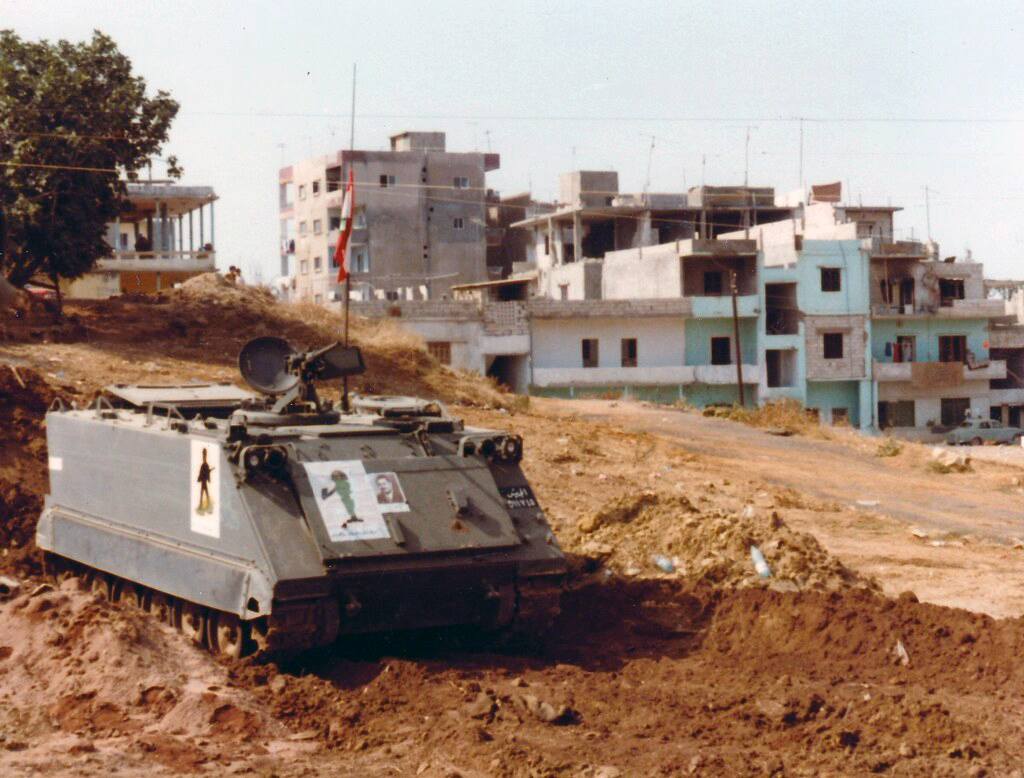
- Lebanese Army in Beirut (1982)
- Date: 19 September 1982
- Meeting no.: 2,396
- Code: S/RES/521 (Document)
- Subject: Israel–Lebanon
- Voting summary: 15 voted for; None voted against; None abstained
- Result: Adopted

Security Council composition
- Permanent members: China; France; Soviet Union; United Kingdom; United States
- Non-permanent members: Guyana; Ireland; Jordan; Japan; Panama; Poland; Spain; Togo; Uganda; Zaire

United Nations Security Council resolution 521, adopted unanimously on 19 September 1982, after condemning the massacre of Palestinians in Beirut, Lebanon, by the Lebanese Forces militia group, the Council reaffirmed resolutions 512 (1982) and 513 (1982) which called for respect for the rights of the civilian population without any discrimination and repudiates all acts of violence against that population.

The resolution continued by authorising the Secretary-General to increase the number of United Nations observers in and around Beirut from 10 to 50 and insists that there shall be no interference with the deployment of the observers and that they shall full freedom of movement. It also requested the Secretary-General to, as a matter of urgency, initiate appropriate consultations and in particular consultations with the Government of Lebanon on additional steps which the Council might take, including the possible deployment of United Nations forces, to assist that Government in ensuring full protection for the civilian population in and around Beirut.

Finally, Resolution 521 reminded Member States to accept and carry out resolutions by the Council under Article 25 of the Charter of the United Nations and requested the Secretary-General to report to the Council within forty-eight hours on developments in the region.

== See also ==
- 1982 Lebanon War
- Cedar Revolution
- Israeli–Lebanese conflict
- Lebanese Civil War
- List of United Nations Security Council Resolutions 501 to 600 (1982–1987)
- Sabra and Shatila massacre
- Syrian occupation of Lebanon
- United Nations Interim Force in Lebanon
