= United Nations Security Council Resolution 511 =

UN Security Council Resolution 511
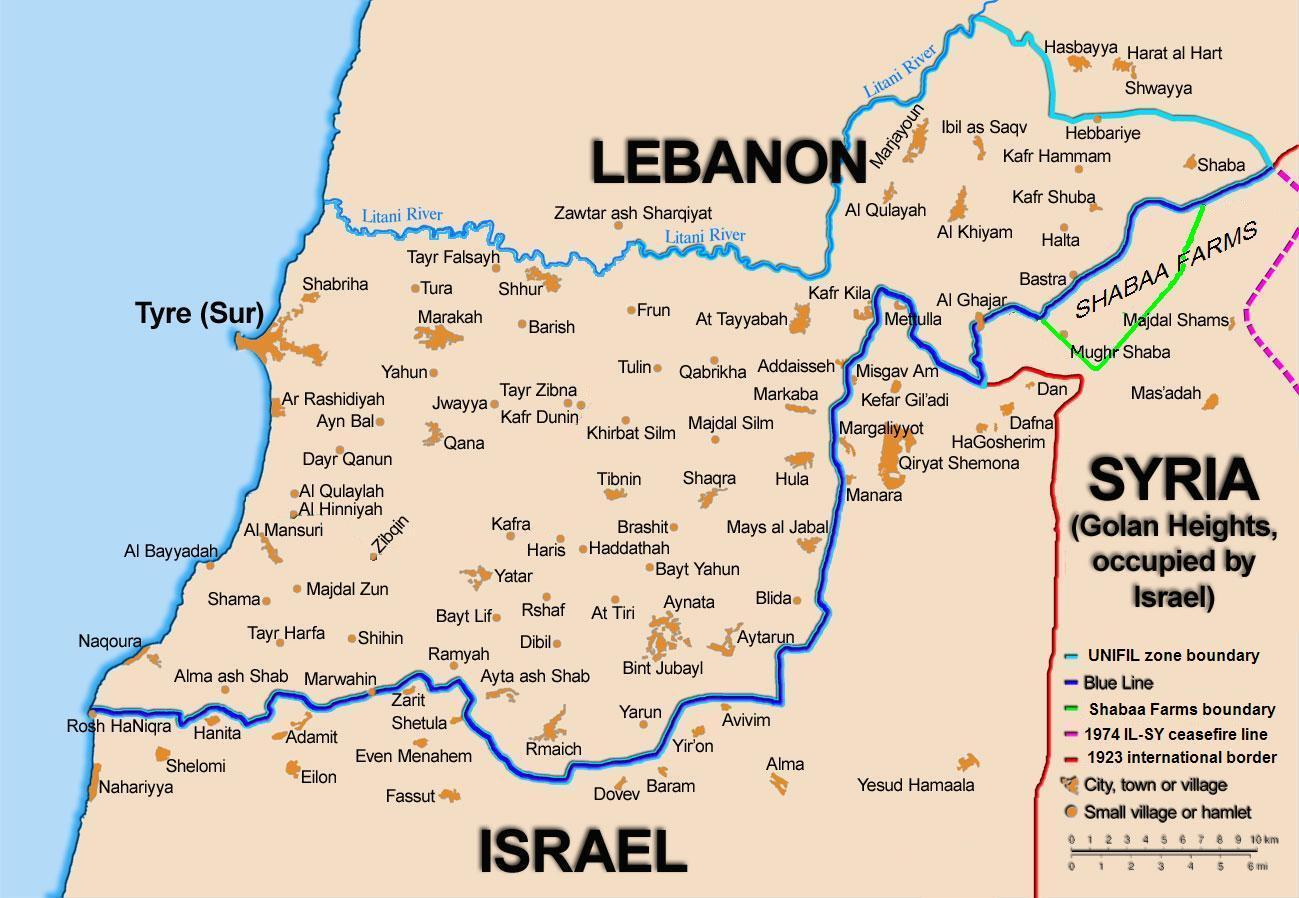
- The Blue Line
- Date: 18 June 1982
- Meeting no.: 2,379
- Code: S/RES/511 (Document)
- Subject: Israel–Lebanon
- Voting summary: 13 voted for; None voted against; 2 abstained
- Result: Adopted

Security Council composition
- Permanent members: China; France; Soviet Union; United Kingdom; United States
- Non-permanent members: Guyana; Ireland; Jordan; Japan; Panama; Poland; Spain; Togo; Uganda; Zaire

United Nations Security Council resolution 511, adopted on 18 June 1982, after recalling previous resolutions on the topic, particularly resolutions 508 (1982) and 509 (1982), and considering a report from the Secretary-General on the United Nations Interim Force in Lebanon (UNIFIL), the Council decided to extend the mandate of UNIFIL for another two months, ending on 19 August 1982.

The Council then called upon all parties to concerned to cooperate fully with the Force, and for the Secretary-General to keep the Council regularly informed on the situation.

Resolution 511 was adopted by 13 votes to none, while the People's Republic of Poland and Soviet Union abstained from voting.

== See also ==
- 1982 Lebanon War
- Blue Line
- Israeli–Lebanese conflict
- List of United Nations Security Council Resolutions 501 to 600 (1982–1987)
