= United Nations Security Council Resolution 515 =

UN Security Council Resolution 515
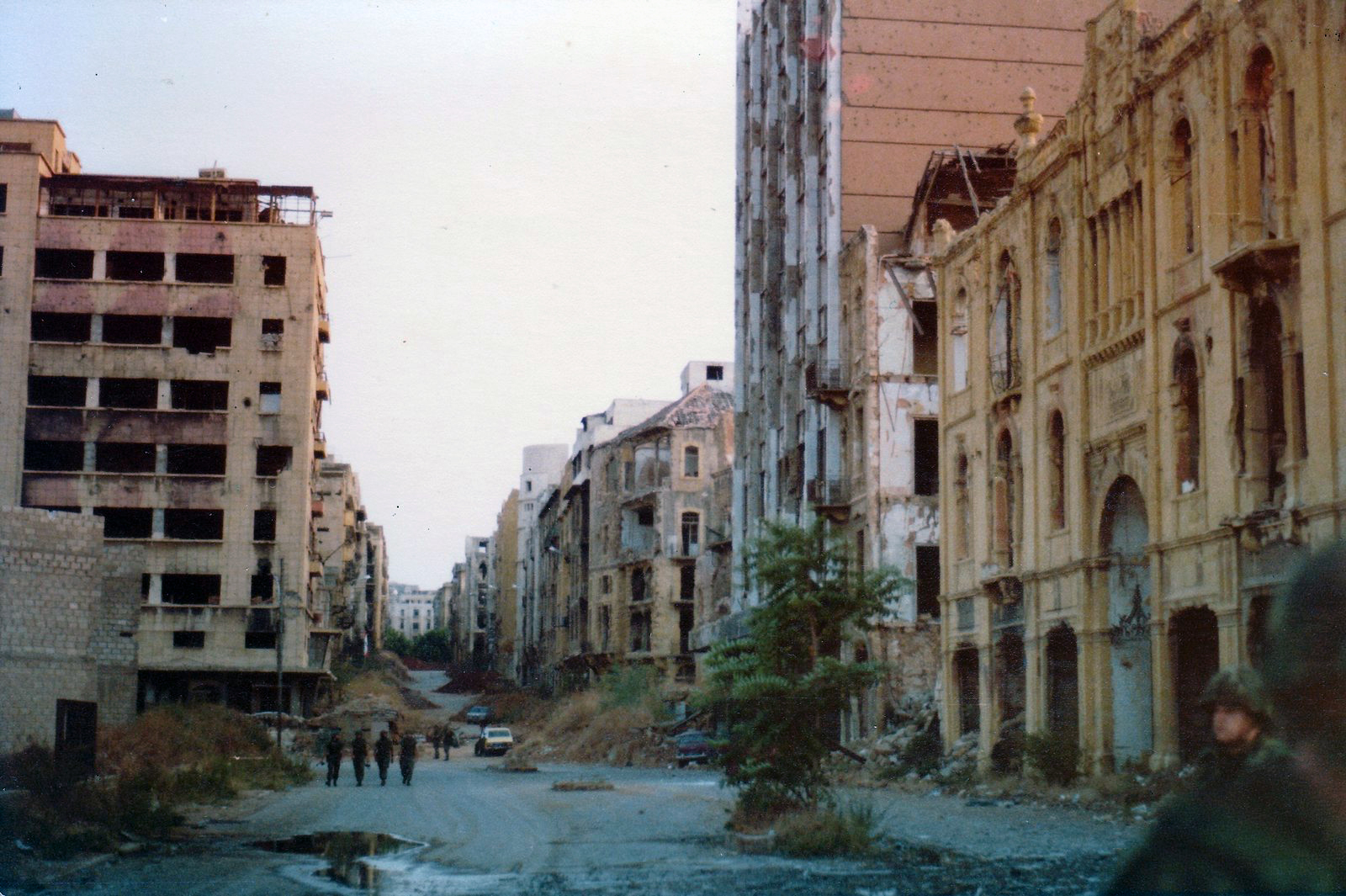
- Beirut (1982)
- Date: 29 July 1982
- Meeting no.: 2,385
- Code: S/RES/515 (Document)
- Subject: Lebanon
- Voting summary: 14 voted for; None voted against; None abstained
- Result: Adopted

Security Council composition
- Permanent members: China; France; Soviet Union; United Kingdom; United States
- Non-permanent members: Guyana; Ireland; Jordan; Japan; Panama; Poland; Spain; Togo; Uganda; Zaire

United Nations Security Council resolution 515, adopted on 29 July 1982, after recalling resolutions 512 (1982), 513 (1982) and the Geneva Conventions, the Council demanded that Israel lift the blockade on Beirut, the capital city of Lebanon, to allow urgent aid to the civilian population there. It also requested the Secretary-General to transmit the text of the resolution to the Government of Israel and to monitor the implementation of Resolution 515.

The resolution passed with 14 votes to none; the United States did not participate in the voting. Israel did not implement the resolution.

== See also ==
- 1982 Lebanon War
- Blue Line
- Green Line, Beirut
- Israeli–Lebanese conflict
- List of United Nations Security Council Resolutions 501 to 600 (1982–1987)
- Siege of Beirut
