= Mount Adir =

Mountain in Israel

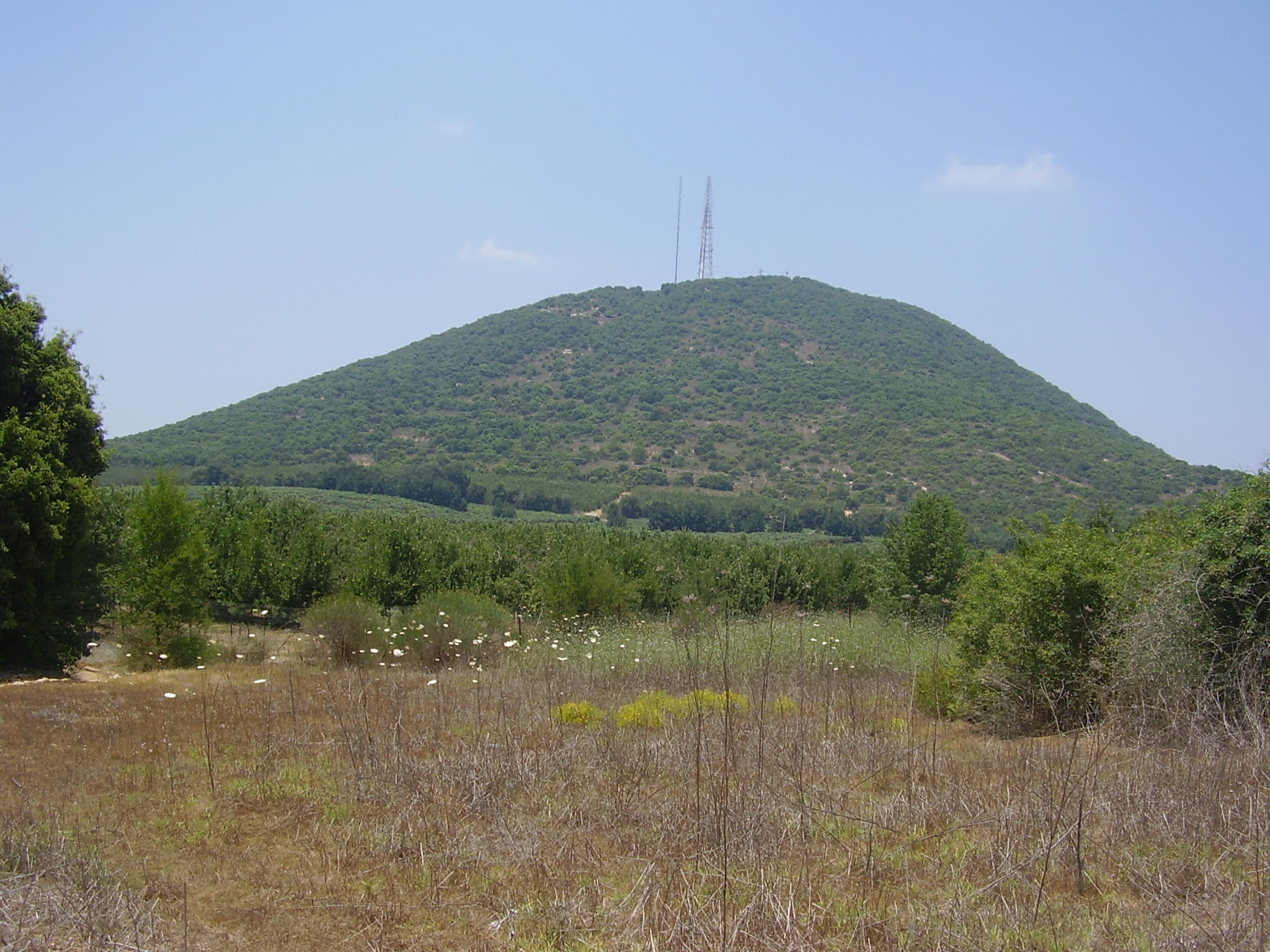
- View of the mount

Highest point
- Elevation: 1,008 m (3,307 ft)
- Coordinates: 33°01′57″N 35°22′20″E

Geography
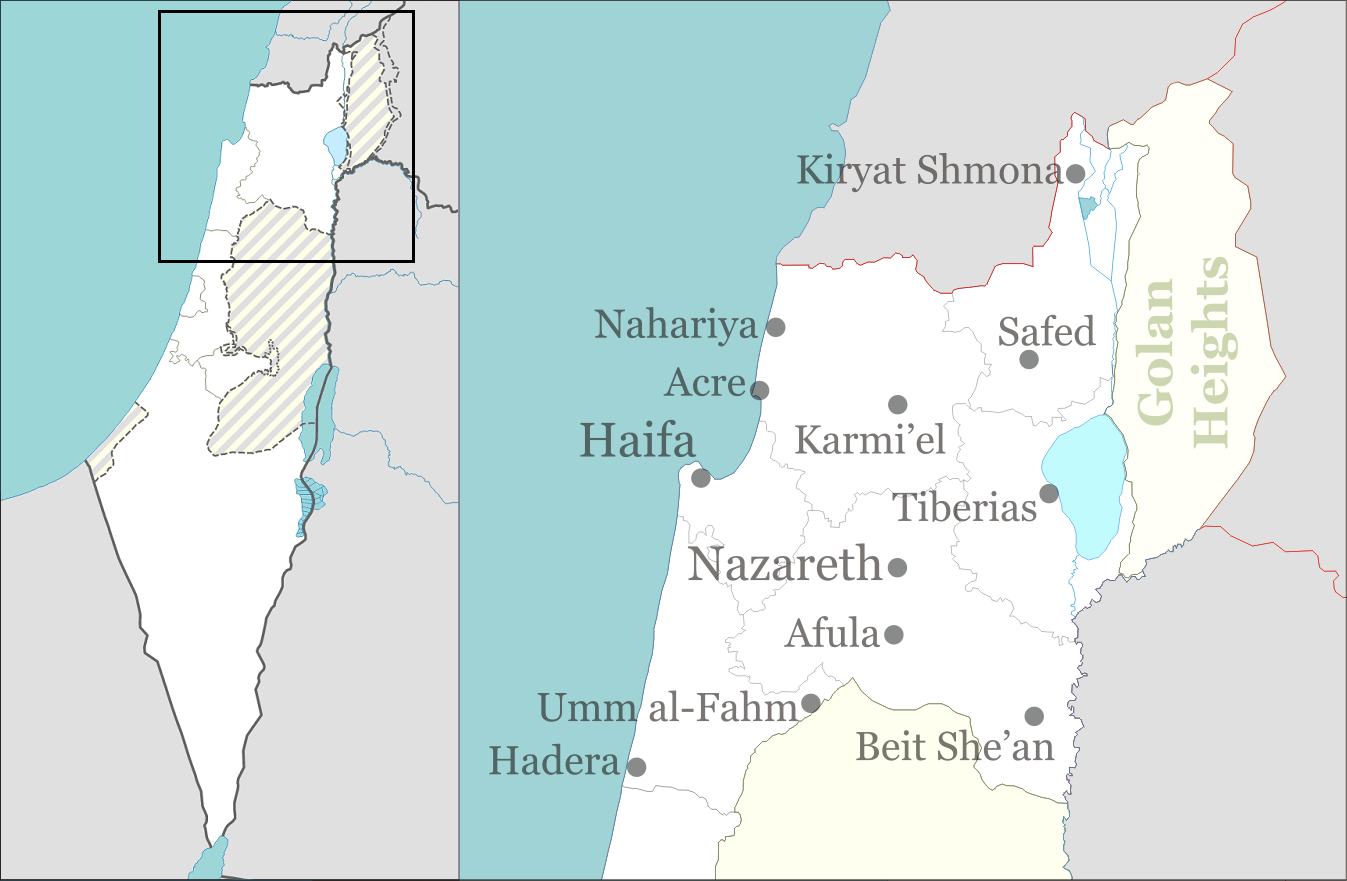
- Location within Northern Haifa region of Israel
- Location: Upper Galilee, Israel

Mount Adir (Hebrew: הר אדיר, romanized: Har Adir, Arabic: جبل عداثر, romanized: Jabal Adathir) is a mountain in the Upper Galilee, Israel, located within the area of the Mount Meron Nature Reserve, near the settlements of Sasa, Mattat, and Hurfeish. The mountain rises to a height of 1,008 meters above sea level, making it one of the highest mountains in Israel. It is covered with a dense Mediterranean forest of oak, terebinth, pistacia, and kermes oak.

The name of the mountain, which overlooks Lebanon, was given to it because of the verse from the Book of Isaiah "and Lebanon with its majestic trees will fall." At the site, there are remnants of a fortress from the Iron Age, which was presumably built by the Omride dynasty of the Kingdom of Israel. The summit of the mountain is closed to visitors and on it is an IDF base with numerous antennas, which are visible from afar.

== Mount Adir lookout ==
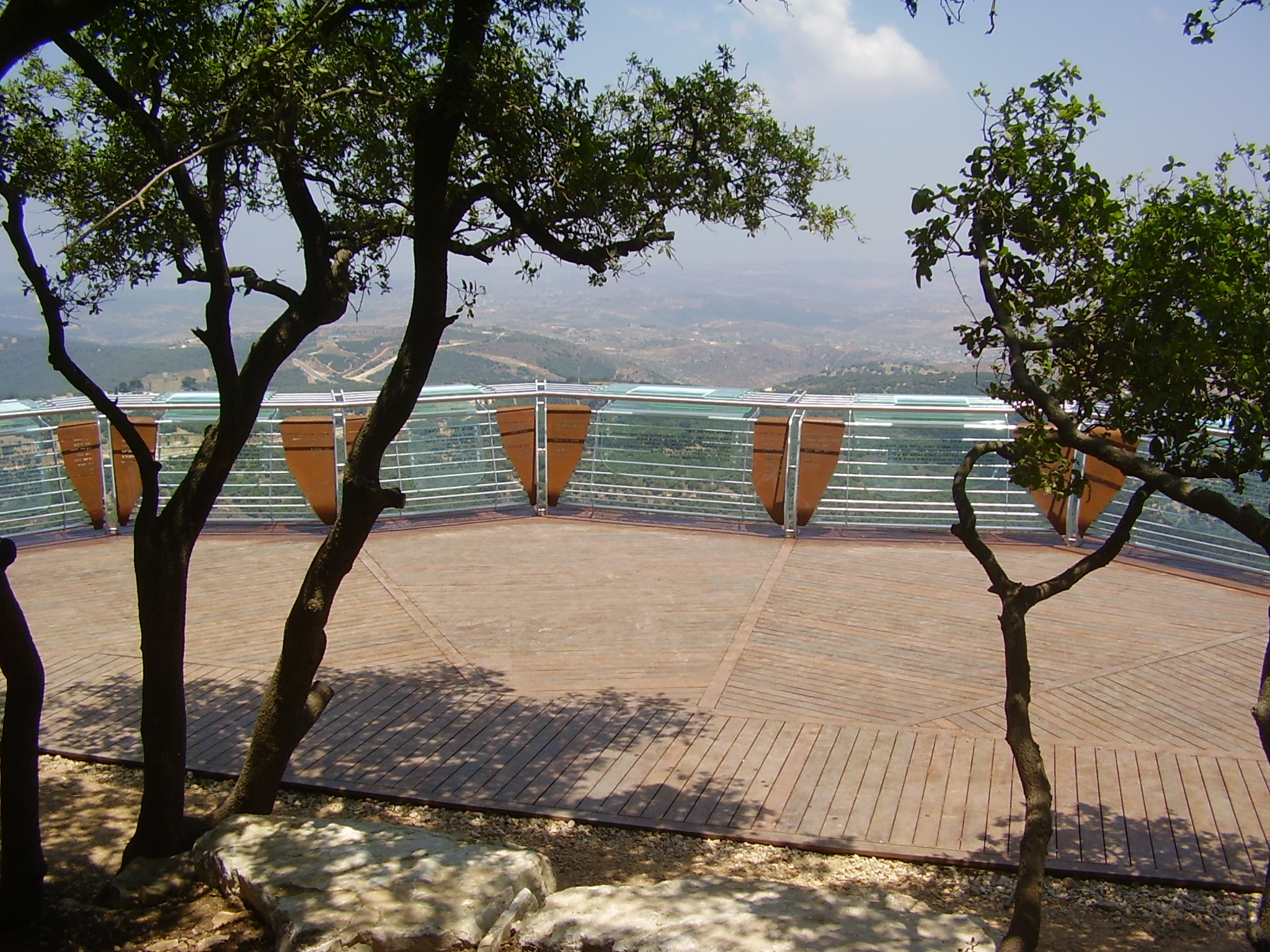
Mount Adir lookout

Mount Adir, close to the border with Lebanon, offers an excellent view towards most of southern Lebanon. On the first memorial day of the Second Lebanon War, the families of the fallen soldiers requested the establishment of a lookout in memory of the war's casualties. Initiated by the bereaved families, the lookout was established by the Israel Nature and Parks Authority and with the assistance of the Jewish National Fund. It was inaugurated in a state ceremony on July 3, 2012, and consists of a wooden deck that can accommodate 180 visitors. On the railing, there are explanations about the course of the war, metal plates with the names of the 121 soldiers who fell during the war, orientation maps of the area, and engraved is the poem by Yehuda Amichai "For Man Is a Tree of the Field".

=== Dedication ===
There is also a plaque with a dedication from the families of soldiers killed in the 2006 Lebanon War.

== Nature ==
Since the lookout is in the Mount Meron Nature Reserve, efforts were made not to harm nature. Therefore, the paved road to the mountain's summit, which was laid many years ago to reach the military base on the mountain, does not reach the lookout. Access to the lookout is possible only on foot, after a walk of about 5 minutes on a dirt road leading from the parking lot adjacent to the military camp.
