= Israel–Lebanon barrier =

Israeli border barrier project

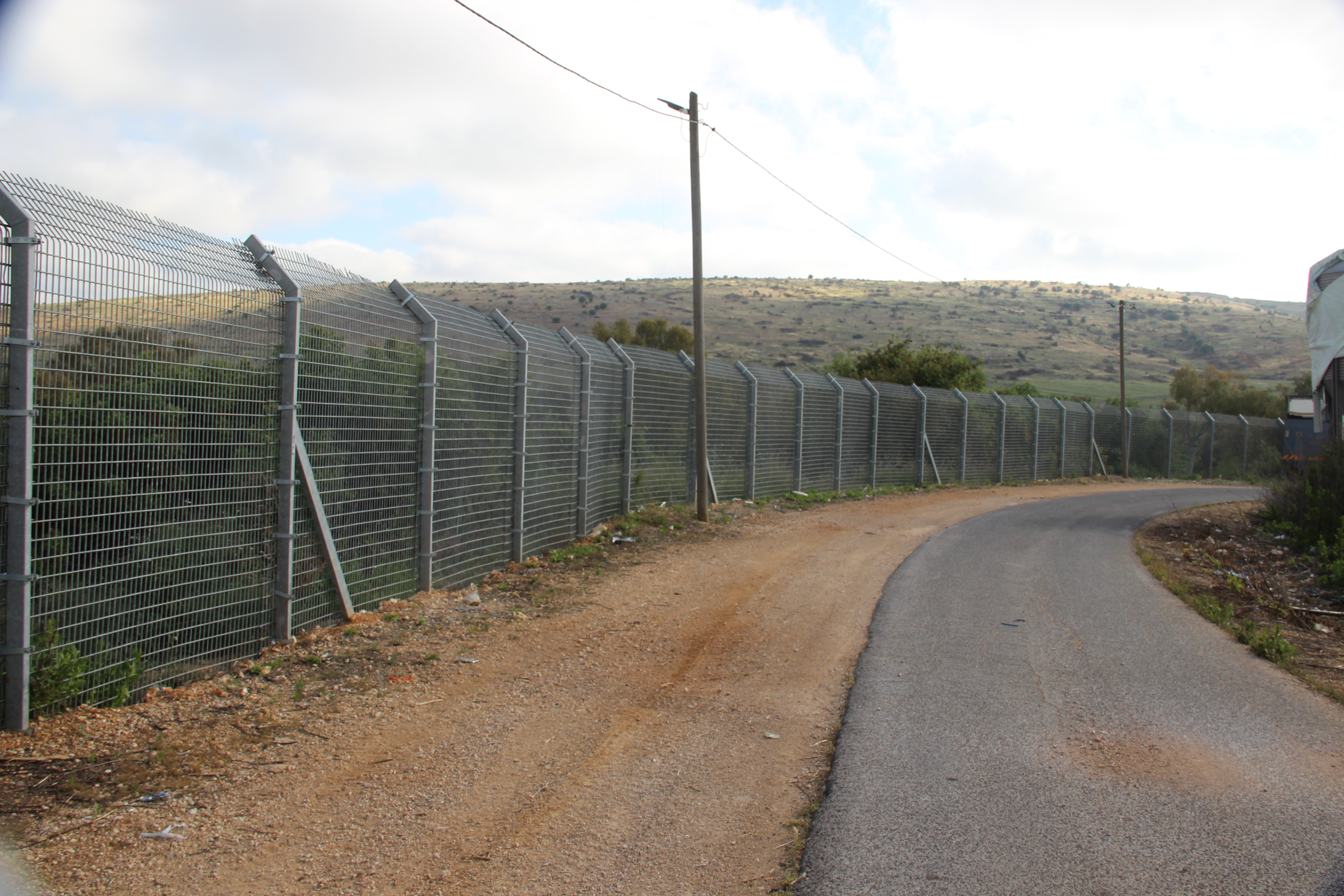
The barrier fence near the Israeli town of Bar'am along the border

The Israel–Lebanon barrier, also called the Interlocking Stone (Hebrew: אבן משתלבת), is a border barrier built by the Israel Defense Forces along the Israel–Lebanon border. The barrier includes fences, a wall 7–9 metres high, embankments, pillbox towers, and dozens of watch towers. The barrier is similar in nature to the Gaza–Israel barrier.

== History ==
In September 2018, the Israeli government announced plans to construct a concrete barrier along the Lebanese border to prevent infiltration from Hezbollah into Israel.

In April 2020, Israel completed an additional 15 km (9.3 mi) of the barrier out of the whole border length of 130 km (81 mi). The completed section includes about 5.2 km (3.2 mi) from Rosh HaNikra to Shlomi, and another 4.6 km (2.9 mi) near Metula and Misgav Am. The other sections under construction include a wall and underground sections. There has been claims that the management is 1.7 billion shekels short of the amount needed to complete the barrier along the entire border.

In November 2025, Lebanon filed a complaint against Israel to the United Nations Security Council over the barrier. Lebanon claimed that Israel's construction of the barrier crossed into Lebanese territory. UNIFIL observers concluded the barrier made 4,000 km^{2} (1,500 sq mi) of Lebanese territory inaccessible to Lebanese residents. However, Israel denies that the barrier ever crosses the Blue Line.
