= United Nations Security Council Resolution 490 =

UN Security Council Resolution 490
- Lebanon
- Date: 21 July 1981
- Meeting no.: 2,293
- Code: S/RES/490 (Document)
- Subject: Lebanon
- Voting summary: 15 voted for; None voted against; None abstained
- Result: Adopted

Security Council composition
- Permanent members: China; France; Soviet Union; United Kingdom; United States
- Non-permanent members: East Germany; Ireland; Japan; Mexico; Niger; Panama; Philippines; Spain; Tunisia; Uganda

United Nations Security Council resolution 490 was adopted unanimously on 21 July 1981, after taking note of a report by the secretary-general. The council called for an immediate cessation of attacks by Israel on Lebanon.

The council went on to demand that Israel respect the territorial integrity of Lebanon, and requested the secretary-general to report back on the situation within 48 hours.

== See also ==
- 1982 Lebanon War
- Blue Line
- Israeli–Lebanese conflict
- List of United Nations Security Council Resolutions 401 to 500 (1976–1982)
