= Mount Meron Nature Reserve =

Declared nature reserve in Israel

Coordinates: 32°59′37″N 35°24′52″E

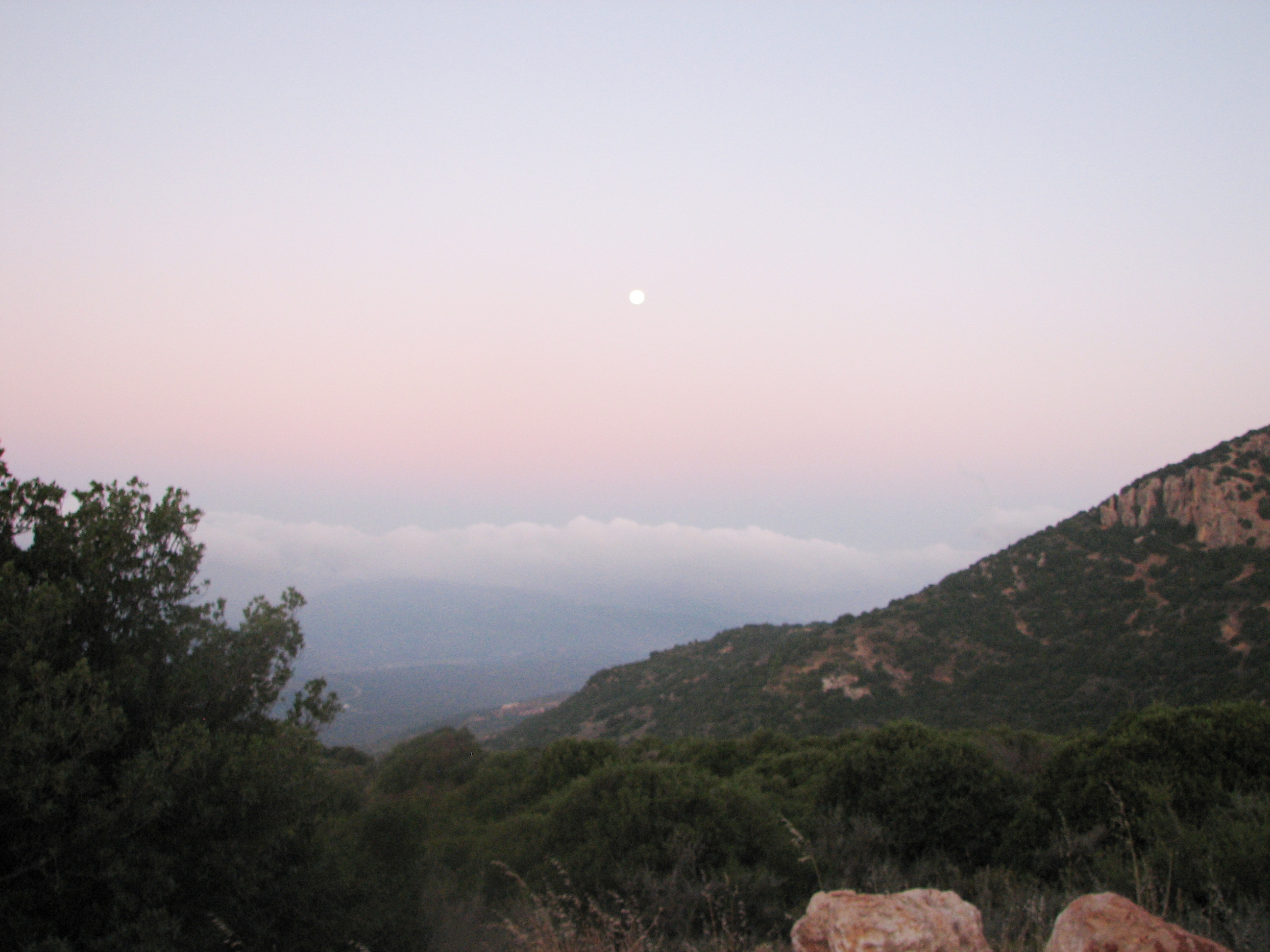
View from Hemdat Yamim

Mount Meron Nature Reserve is a declared nature reserve in the Galilee that constitutes the largest nature reserve in northern Israel, with an area of 90,596 dunams. The reserve was declared on December 9, 1965, and has undergone several expansions and reductions in area since then. The Mount Meron Nature Reserve is among the largest and oldest nature reserves in the Land of Israel.

== History ==
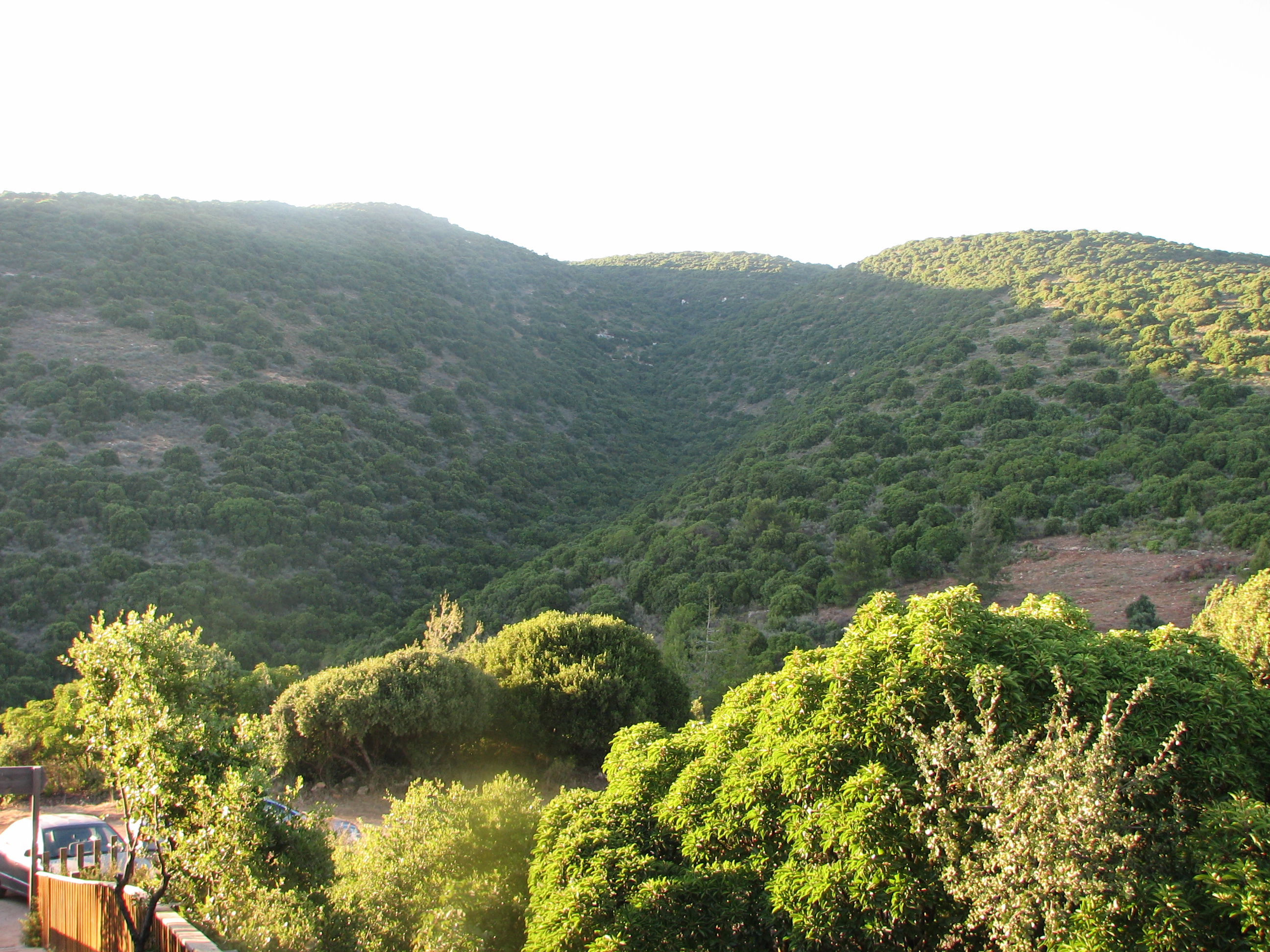
Landscape view

The reserve was declared a forest reserve by the British Mandate in 1942, and was included in May 1956 in a plan to declare 50 nature reserves in Israel presented by the Nature Protection Section in cooperation with the Planning Department of the Ministry of Interior and Society for the Protection of Nature in Israel. The reserve was officially declared by the Israel Nature and Parks Authority in 1965 on an area of about 84,000 dunams. Within the boundaries of the reserve was the enclave – the village of Beit Jann and its surroundings. Since then, the boundaries of the reserve have changed several times due to the reduction of areas adjacent to settlements (mainly Beit Jann and Hurfeish) and the addition of several natural areas that were not included in the original boundaries of the reserve. Over the years, there has been a struggle to preserve the reserve against several settlements located within it or on its border. Particularly notable was the struggle of the people of Beit Jann to expand it and build a road to the village of Hurfeish. The isolated settlement of Hemdat Yamim also fought for many years for its existence within the reserve. Apart from these settlements, the IDF built bases in the heart of the reserve, including the Northern Regional Control Unit (YABA) of the Air Force on the mountain's peak. During the Second Lebanon War, many Katyusha rockets fell on Mount Meron and the nearby settlements, causing large fires in the area.

== Fauna ==
=== Mammals ===
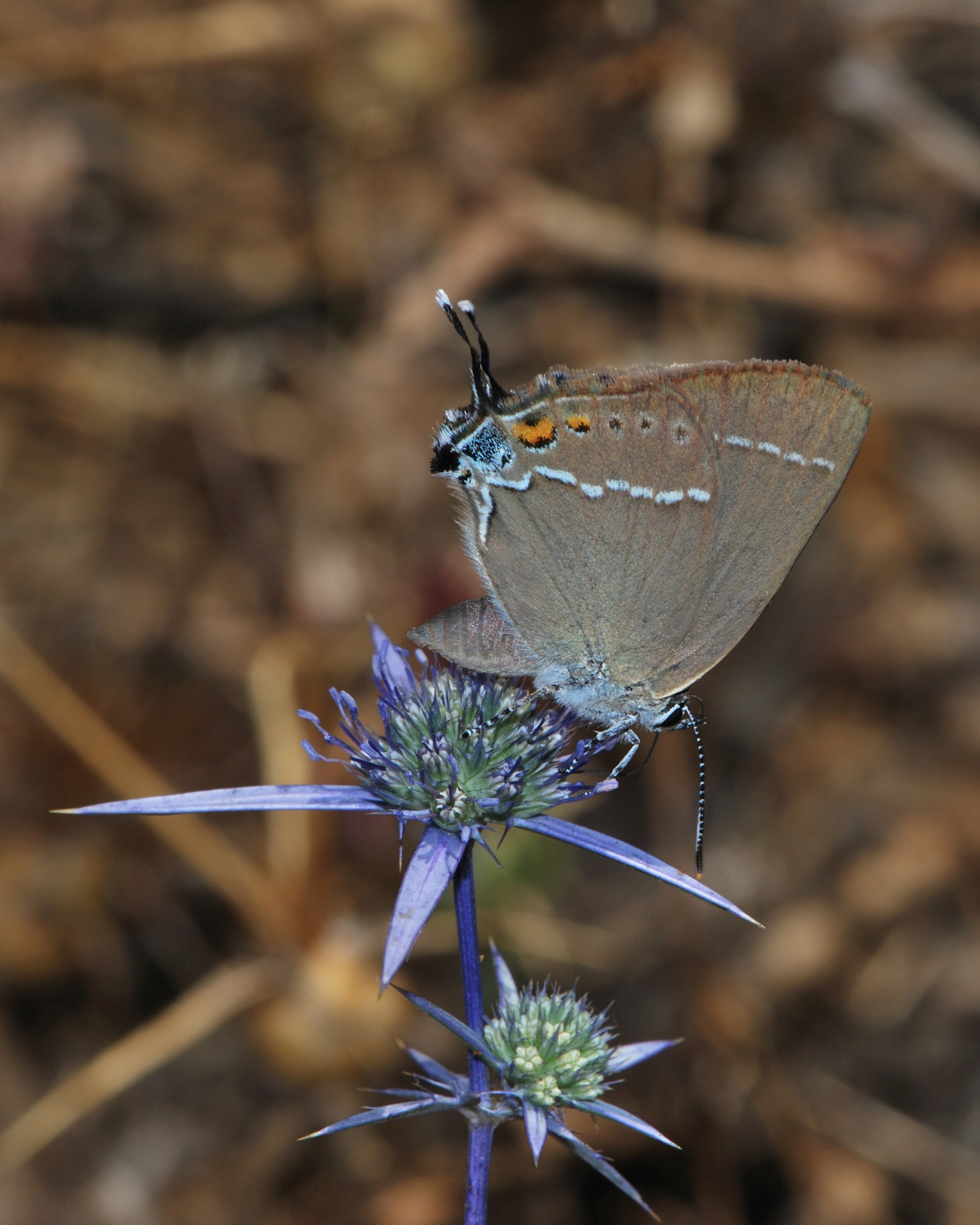
Satyrium spini on Eryngium creticum

Among the mammals living in the reserve are: wild boar, golden jackal, Indian wolf, red fox, common genet, tree hyrax, rock hyrax, and various species of Microbat that inhabit the abundance of caves offered by the reserve. In the past, the Persian fallow deer and the roe deer lived in the reserve, but they have been extinct for a long time, and in recent years, the fallow deer were reintroduced to the nearby Har Sasa reserve.

=== Reptiles ===
One of the reptiles living in the reserve is the green lizard.

=== Amphibians ===
Six out of the seven species of amphibians living in Israel reside in the reserve, including the fire salamander.

== Flora ==
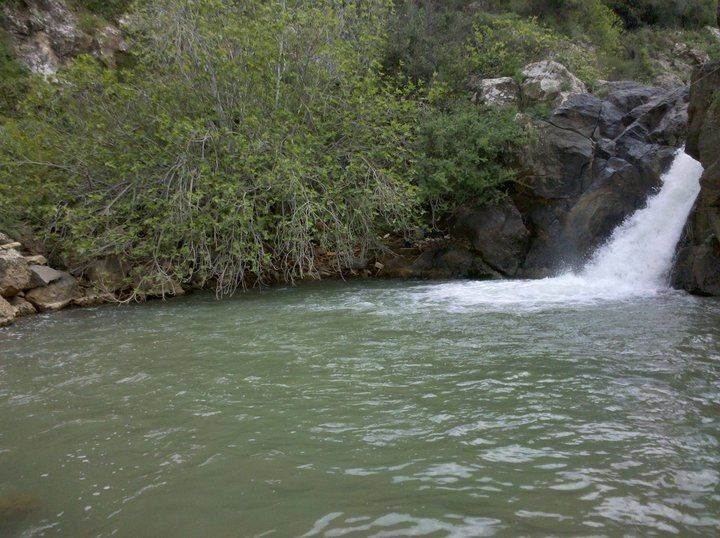
Dishon Stream

The reserve is characterized by diverse Mediterranean forests, woodlands, and scrub. The uniqueness of the reserve in particular, and Mount Meron in general, is that it serves as the southern distribution limit for many plants that represent the flora of the mountains of Turkey and Lebanon. Among the species of trees and shrubs living in the reserve are: common oak, Pistacia terebinthus, Arbutus andrachne, kermes oak, Syrian pear, Prunus ursina, and also rare species such as Eriolobus trilobatus and Juniperus oxycedrus. Other plant species living in the reserve are: Paeonia mascula, broad-leaved helleborine, Himantoglossum caprinum, noble orchid, Crocus pallasii, Sternbergia clusiana, Greek anemone, Iris histrio, Hyacinthus orientalis, and more.
