= United Nations Security Council Resolution 519 =

UN Security Council Resolution 519
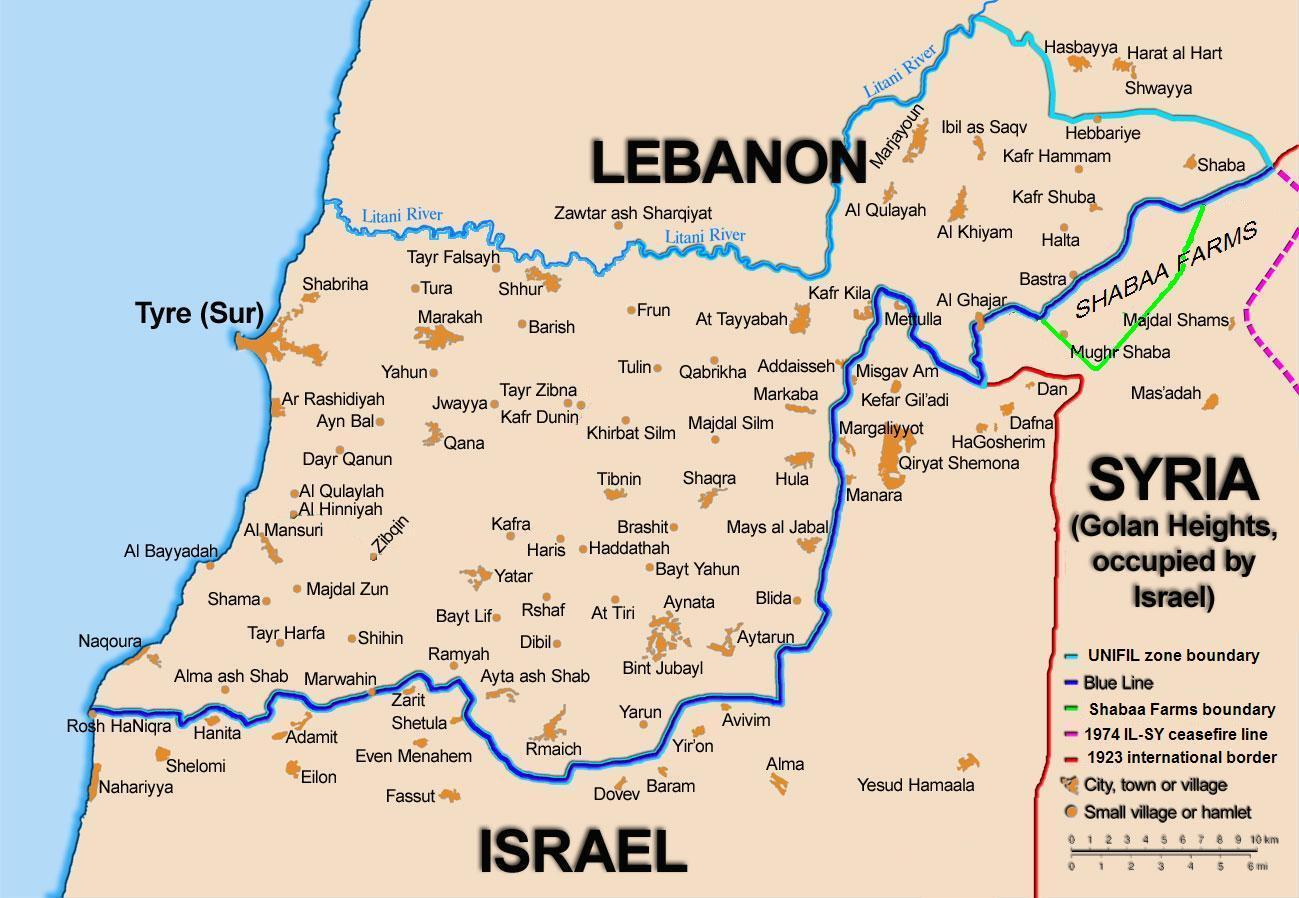
- The Blue Line
- Date: 17 August 1982
- Meeting no.: 2,393
- Code: S/RES/519 (Document)
- Subject: Israel–Lebanon
- Voting summary: 13 voted for; None voted against; 2 abstained
- Result: Adopted

Security Council composition
- Permanent members: China; France; Soviet Union; United Kingdom; United States
- Non-permanent members: Guyana; Ireland; Jordan; Japan; Panama; Poland; Spain; Togo; Uganda; Zaire

United Nations Security Council resolution 519, adopted on 17 August 1982, after recalling previous resolutions on the topic and studying the report by the secretary-general on the United Nations Interim Force in Lebanon (UNIFIL), the council noted the situation between Israel and Lebanon warranted an extension of UNIFIL, until 19 October 1982.

The council then authorised UNIFIL to carry out humanitarian tasks in addition to its usual mandate, and supported the secretary-general and observers from the United Nations Truce Supervision Organization in their roles.

The resolution was adopted by 13 votes to none, while the People's Republic of Poland and Soviet Union abstained from voting.

== See also ==
- 1982 Lebanon War
- Blue Line
- Israeli–Lebanese conflict
- List of United Nations Security Council Resolutions 501 to 600 (1982–1987)
