= United Nations Security Council Resolution 513 =

UN Security Council Resolution 513
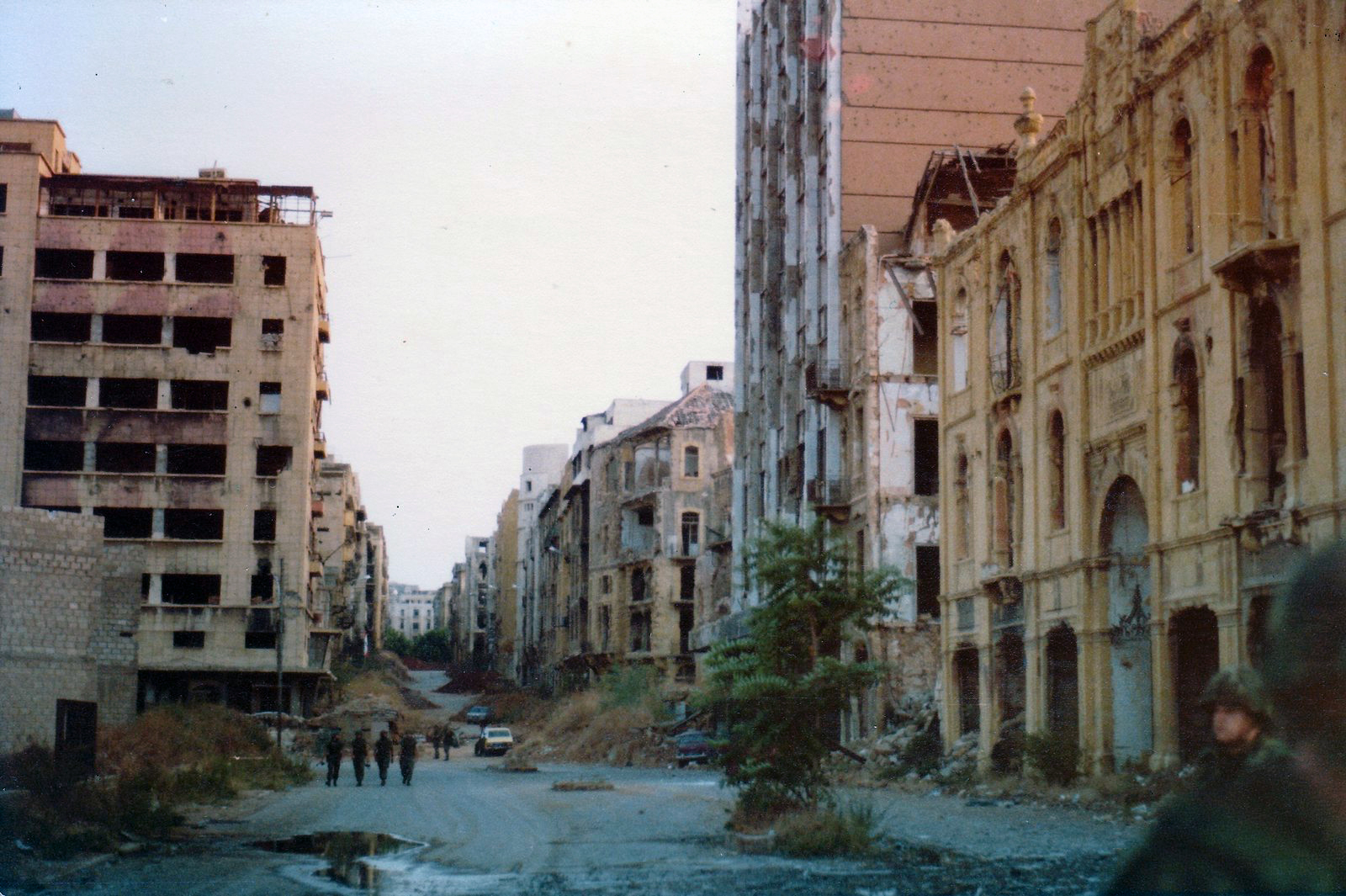
- Beirut (1982)
- Date: 4 July 1982
- Meeting no.: 2,382
- Code: S/RES/513 (Document)
- Subject: Lebanon
- Voting summary: 15 voted for; None voted against; None abstained
- Result: Adopted

Security Council composition
- Permanent members: China; France; Soviet Union; United Kingdom; United States
- Non-permanent members: Guyana; Ireland; Jordan; Japan; Panama; Poland; Spain; Togo; Uganda; Zaire

United Nations Security Council resolution 513, adopted unanimously on 4 July 1982, after recalling resolutions 508 (1982), 509 (1982), 512 (1982) and the Geneva Conventions, the council expressed its alarm at the deteriorating humanitarian situation in west Beirut and southern Lebanon.

The resolution called on Israel, Lebanon and all other parties concerned to respect the rights of the civilian population, and to restore vital supplies of water, electricity, food and medical provisions. The council also commended the work of the Secretary-General and international aid agencies to alleviate the suffering of the civilian population.

== See also ==
- 1982 Lebanon War
- Blue Line
- Israeli–Lebanese conflict
- List of United Nations Security Council Resolutions 501 to 600 (1982–1987)
