= United Nations Security Council Resolution 512 =

UN Security Council Resolution 512
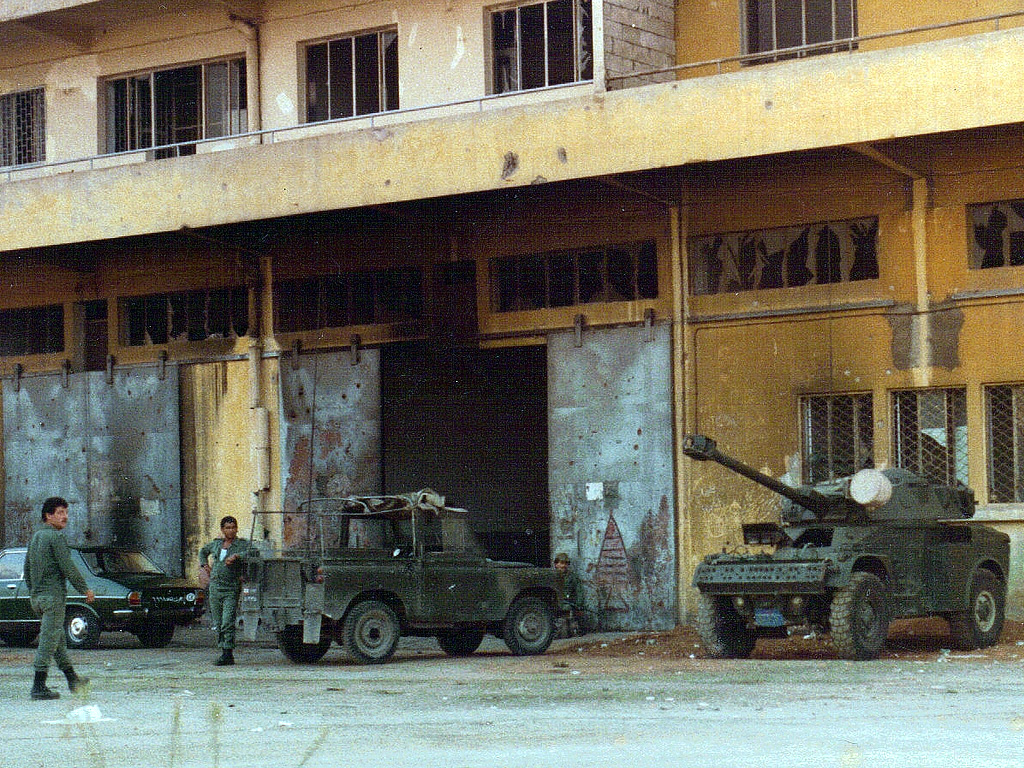
- Lebanese Army in Beirut (1982)
- Date: 19 June 1982
- Meeting no.: 2,380
- Code: S/RES/512 (Document)
- Subject: Lebanon
- Voting summary: 15 voted for; None voted against; None abstained
- Result: Adopted

Security Council composition
- Permanent members: China; France; Soviet Union; United Kingdom; United States
- Non-permanent members: Guyana; Ireland; Jordan; Japan; Panama; Poland; Spain; Togo; Uganda; Zaire

United Nations Security Council resolution 512, adopted unanimously on 19 June 1982, after recalling resolutions 508 (1982), 509 (1982) and reaffirming the Geneva Conventions, the Council reminded all parties involved in the conflict in Lebanon to respect the rights of the civilian population by allowing the free distribution of aid from United Nations agencies and the International Committee of the Red Cross.

The resolution also called on Member States to provide assistance to the country, as well as reminding Member States of the humanitarian responsibilities of the relevant UN agencies. Finally, the Council requested the assistance of the Secretary-General with the situation, and to report back on developments regarding the implementation of the resolution.

== See also ==
- 1982 Lebanon War
- Blue Line
- Israeli–Lebanese conflict
- List of United Nations Security Council Resolutions 501 to 600 (1982–1987)
