= United Nations Security Council Resolution 509 =

UN Security Council Resolution 509
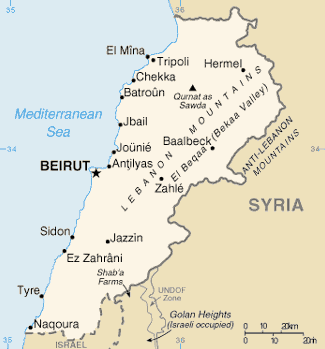
- Lebanon
- Date: 6 June 1982
- Meeting no.: 2,375
- Code: S/RES/509 (Document)
- Subject: Israel–Lebanon
- Voting summary: 15 voted for; None voted against; None abstained
- Result: Adopted

Security Council composition
- Permanent members: China; France; Soviet Union; United Kingdom; United States
- Non-permanent members: Guyana; Ireland; Jordan; Japan; Panama; Poland; Spain; Togo; Uganda; Zaire

United Nations Security Council resolution 509, adopted unanimously on 6 June 1982, after recalling previous resolutions on the topic including 425 (1978) and 508 (1982), the Council expressed concern and demanded Israel unconditionally withdraw all its military forces from Lebanon back to its internationally recognised border.

Resolution 509 went on to demand all parties observe the ceasefire in Resolution 508, and to communicate the acceptance of the ceasefire to the Secretary-General within 24 hours.

== See also ==
- 1982 Lebanon War
- Blue Line
- Israeli–Lebanese conflict
- List of United Nations Security Council Resolutions 501 to 600 (1982–1987)
