= Blue Line (withdrawal line) =

Israel–Lebanon border demarcated by the United Nations in 2000

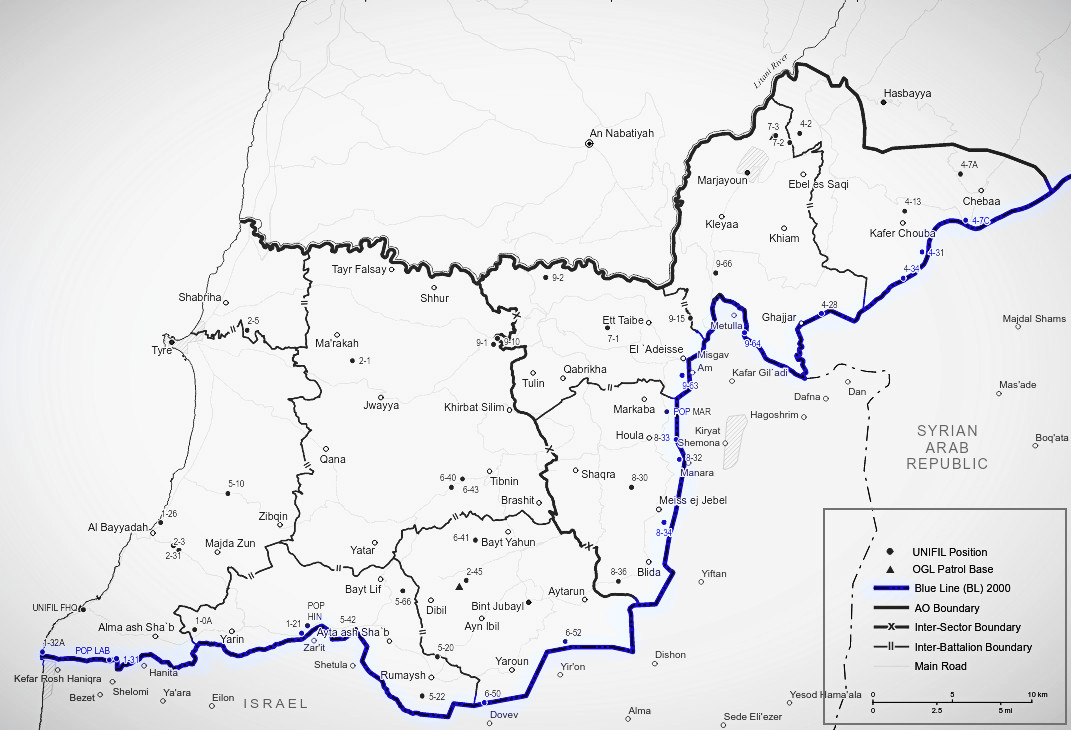
The Blue Line covers the Lebanese-Israeli border. An extension covers the Lebanese-Golan Heights border.

The Blue Line is a demarcation line dividing Lebanon from Israel and the Golan Heights. It was published by the United Nations on 7 June 2000 for the purposes of determining whether Israel had fully withdrawn from Lebanon. It has been described as "temporary" and "not a border, but a “line of withdrawal”. It is the subject of an ongoing border dispute between Israel, Lebanon, and Hezbollah.

On 19 March 1978, the United Nations Security Council adopted Resolutions 425 and 426 calling for Israeli withdrawal from Lebanon following its recent invasion and to ensure that the government of Lebanon restores effective authority in the area to the border. The United Nations Security Council and NATO set up the United Nations Interim Force in Lebanon (UNIFIL) as a peacekeeping force to supervise the situation in Southern Lebanon.

By September 2018, Israel has completed 11 kilometers of the Israel–Lebanon barrier on its side of the demarcation line to protect Israeli communities from infiltration by Hezbollah militants. The length of the barrier is 130 kilometres (81 mi) and was expected to be complete by 2020. The project was expected to cost $450 million. Most of the barrier is a concrete wall topped by steel mesh, sensors and surveillance cameras. Steel fencing was used instead of concrete in especially rugged areas.

== Origin ==
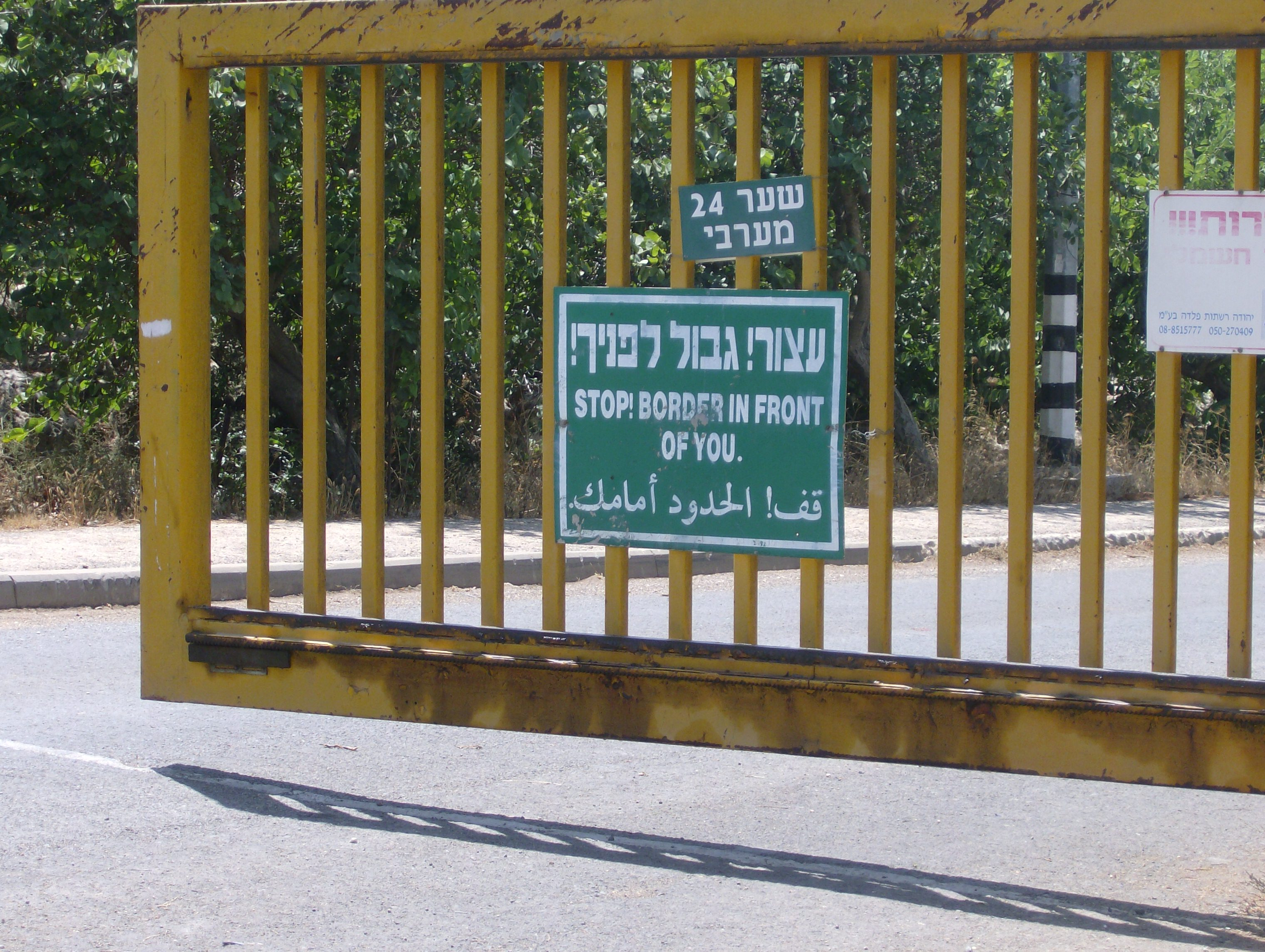
The Israel–Lebanon border fence, north of Metula.

The boundary which later became the border between Israel and Lebanon was first created following the First World War and the establishment of the British mandate of Palestine and the French mandate of Lebanon.

Following the establishment of the State of Israel in May 1948, fighting broke out between Israeli and Lebanese forces. The fighting came to an end in March 1949 with an armistice agreement, which reestablished the Palestine-Lebanon border as the Israeli-Lebanese border.

On 11 March 1978 Palestine Liberation Organization (PLO) operatives, led by Dalal Mugrabi, carried out the Coastal road massacre within Israel which resulted in the deaths of 37 Israelis, including 13 children, and 76 wounded. In response, Israeli forces invaded southern Lebanon from which the PLO operated regularly during the 1970s. Starting on the night of March 14–15 and culminating a few days later, Israel Defense Forces (IDF) troops occupied the entire southern part of Lebanon except for the city of Tyre and its surrounding area.

This operation is known in Israel as Operation Litani, the stated objective of which was to clear out PLO bases in Lebanon south of the Litani River, in order to better secure northern Israel and to support the Christian Lebanese militias in the Lebanese Civil War - most notably the Free Lebanon Army.

On 15 March 1978 the Lebanese government submitted a strong protest to the United Nations Security Council against the Israeli invasion, stating that it had no connection with the Palestinian operation.

On 19 March 1978 the Council adopted Resolution 425, in which it called upon Israel to cease immediately its military action and withdraw its forces from all Lebanese territory. It also established the United Nations Interim Force in Lebanon (UNIFIL). The first UNIFIL troops arrived in the area on 23 March 1978.

The Blue Line is based on the deployment of the IDF prior to 14 March 1978. It should not be confused with the Green Line, established in 1949, which is the armistice line of the 1948 Arab–Israeli War, nor the Green Line in Beirut during the violence of the 1980s. The 1949 line is in turn the same as the 1923 Mandate Line, which was the border between French- and British-mandated territory. See: Paulet–Newcombe Agreement. Lebanon is a former French mandate and Palestine / Israel a former British mandate, per the League of Nations. The 1949 agreement stated that the border would follow the 1923 line.

In 1923, 38 boundary markers were placed along the 49 mile border and a detailed text description was published. The 2000 Blue Line differs in about a half dozen short stretches from the 1949 line, though never by more than 475 meters.

Borders are usually negotiated between countries, and between 1950 and 1967 Israeli and Lebanese surveyors managed to complete 25 non-contiguous kilometers and mark, but not sign, another quarter of the international border. On 17 April 2000, when Israeli Prime Minister Ehud Barak announced that Israel would begin withdrawing its forces from Lebanon, the Lebanese government did not want to take part in marking the border. The UN conducted its own survey based on the line discussed in United Nations Security Council Resolution 425.

On 25 May 2000 the government of Israel notified the Secretary-General that Israel had redeployed its forces in compliance with Security Council resolutions 425.

From 24 May to 7 June 2000, a UN Special Envoy traveled to Israel and Lebanon to follow up on the implementation of the Secretary-General's May 22 report. The United Nations cartographer and his team, assisted by UNIFIL, worked on the ground to identify a line to be adopted for the practical purposes of confirming the Israeli withdrawal. While it was agreed that this would not be a formal border demarcation, the aim was to identify a line on the ground closely conforming to the internationally recognized boundaries of Lebanon, based on the best available cartographic and other documentary evidence.

On 7 June 2000, the completed map showing the withdrawal line was formally transmitted by the Force Commander of UNIFIL to his Lebanese and Israeli counterparts. Notwithstanding their reservations about the line, the Governments of Israel and Lebanon confirmed that identifying this line was solely the responsibility of the United Nations and that they would respect the line as identified. On 8 June, UNIFIL teams led by Lebanese Brig. General Imad Anka and Brigadier General Amin Htait began the work of verifying the Israeli withdrawal behind the line.

The Secretary-General reported to the Security Council that Israel had withdrawn its forces from Lebanon on 16 June, in accordance with resolution 425 (1978), and met the requirements defined in his report of 22 May 2000. Namely, that Israel had completed the withdrawal in conformity with the line identified by the United Nations, the South Lebanese Army militia had been dismantled, and all detainees held at Al-Khiam prison had been freed.

The withdrawal line has been termed the Blue Line in all official UN communications since.

== Border dispute ==
Despite the Blue Line being respected as a de facto boundary, there remains a border dispute that arose after Israel's withdrawal from territory it occupied in southern Lebanon in 2002, with Lebanon arguing that Israel is still holding Lebanese lands, even though the United Nations certified the withdrawal. As of October 2023, Amos Hochstein, the US government official who helped resolve the Israeli–Lebanese maritime border dispute, was holding talks to resolve the land border dispute.

The border dispute is based around 13 or 14 points, including in the village of Ghajar, Shebaa Farms and the hills around Kfarchouba. Dorothy Shea, a former ambassador to Lebanon, said that talks had settled at least 7 of the disputed points. A retired Lebanese general described the majority of the disputed areas as "fighting over a couple of centimeters".

Rosh HaNikra/Naqoura
The westmost point of the land connection between Lebanon and Israel lies in between the Israeli kibbutz of Rosh Hanikra and the Lebanese city of Naqoura. The exact point where Lebanon, Israel, and the Mediterranean Sea has been designated as Point B1, and is the starting off point for the negotiated sea border. However, the ownership of B1 is in dispute with Lebanon making a claim, citing the 1923 Paulet–Newcombe Agreement. Israel is reportedly reluctant to surrender the peak, since it is a high point that provides a view as far as Haifa.
Shlomi
Aalma ech Chaab
Hanita
Shomera/Boustane
Shtula/Marwahin
Har Adir/Rmaich
Avivim/Maroun al-Ras
Yiftah/Blida
Manara/Meiss Ej Jabal
Metula
Misgav Am/Adaisseh
Kafr Kila
Kafr Kila abuts Israel from Lebanon. Israel has constructed a security wall at the edge of the city, and has undertaken several operations to destroy tunnels from the village to northern Israel.
Shebaa Farms/Ghajar
Israel continues to occupy northern Ghajar, but has attempted to withdraw repeatedly. This withdrawal to southern Ghajar has been complicated by residents objection to both the splitting of the village and Lebanese control, preferring a united village under Israeli control. Shebaa Farms, a nearby area, has a more complicated status. Israel and the United Nations view the territory as originally belonging to Syria, and therefore not covered by UNSC Resolution 1701. Lebanon claims it as Lebanese territory, and views the Israeli presence as a violation of international law.

== Violations ==
The de facto boundary has been violated on multiple occasions. Most famously, Israel continues to occupy northern Ghajar. The majority of border violations are exchanges of fire or other limited military operations.

On 7 October 2000, Hezbollah forces abducted three Israeli soldiers while the latter patrolled the southern (Israeli) side of the demarcation line. The soldiers were killed either during the attack or shortly after. This sparked the 2000–06 Shebaa Farms conflict, which began at a low-intensity, but steadily escalated. From 2000 to 2007, Israeli jets violated Lebanese airspace over 1,600 times, often breaking the sound barrier over several southern villages. Lebanese troops responded by firing at the Israeli jets with anti-aircraft weapons. The conflict culminated in the 34‑day 2006 Lebanon War. Israel responded to diversionary rocketing of civilian villages and an attack on an Israeli tank patrol with massive airstrikes and artillery fire on Lebanese targets and a ground invasion of southern Lebanon.

The border stayed quiet until the 2010 Israel–Lebanon border clash, in which Lebanese Armed Forces opened fire on Israeli army soldiers performing tree-cutting maintenance work on the Israeli side of the Blue Line, killing one. Three Lebanese died when the Israel Defense Forces (IDF) responded. Lebanese Information Minister Tarek Mitri stated despite the fact that Lebanon accepted the earlier Blue line "The area where the tree was to be cut yesterday […] is south of the Blue Line but is Lebanese territory."

In 2011, UNIFIL confirmed a border incident in which no one was hurt. Israel and Lebanon offered differing accounts of the incident. A Lebanese military official said Israeli troops crossed the Blue Line, 30 meters into Lebanese territory, prompting Lebanese soldiers to fire warning shots and the Israeli troops to retreat and fire at Lebanese border posts. The Israeli military sources said their forces were within Israeli territory when they came under fire from across the border.

On 15 December 2013, a Lebanese Army sniper shot dead an Israeli soldier in the Rosh Hanikra border.

In 2015, after an Israeli attack against a military convoy carrying Hezbollah and Iranian officers in southern Syria, on 28 January 2015, Hezbollah fired an anti-tank missile at an Israeli military convoy in the Shebaa farms, killing two soldiers and wounding seven. In response, Israel fired at least 50 artillery shells across the border into southern Lebanon, killing a Spanish UN peacekeeper.

In December 2018, Israel initiated Operation Northern Shield to destroy cross-border tunnels built by Hezbollah along the border.

On 27 July 2020, Israeli soldiers and four Hezbollah combatants exchanged fire.

In 2021, rockets and a drone were launched from Southern Lebanon into Israel, which responded with artillery fire. There were no reported casualties but the rockets ignited a bush fire.

In 2023 and 2024, a large number of Blue Line violations by Hezbollah, Palestinian factions under their control, and Israel took place during the Gaza war and the Israel–Hezbollah conflict.

In 2025, UNIFIL reported that Israel had violated the Blue Line by building a wall inside Lebanese territory. Israel army denied the accusation, stating that the wall does not cross the Blue Line.

== See also ==
- Good Fence
- Green Line (Israel)
- Green Line (Lebanon)
- Purple Line
- Yellow Line
- Shebaa Farms
- United Nations Security Council Resolution 1559
- United Nations Security Council Resolution 1583
- South Lebanon security belt
- Tegart's Wall
