= United Nations Security Council Resolution 508 =

UN Security Council Resolution 508
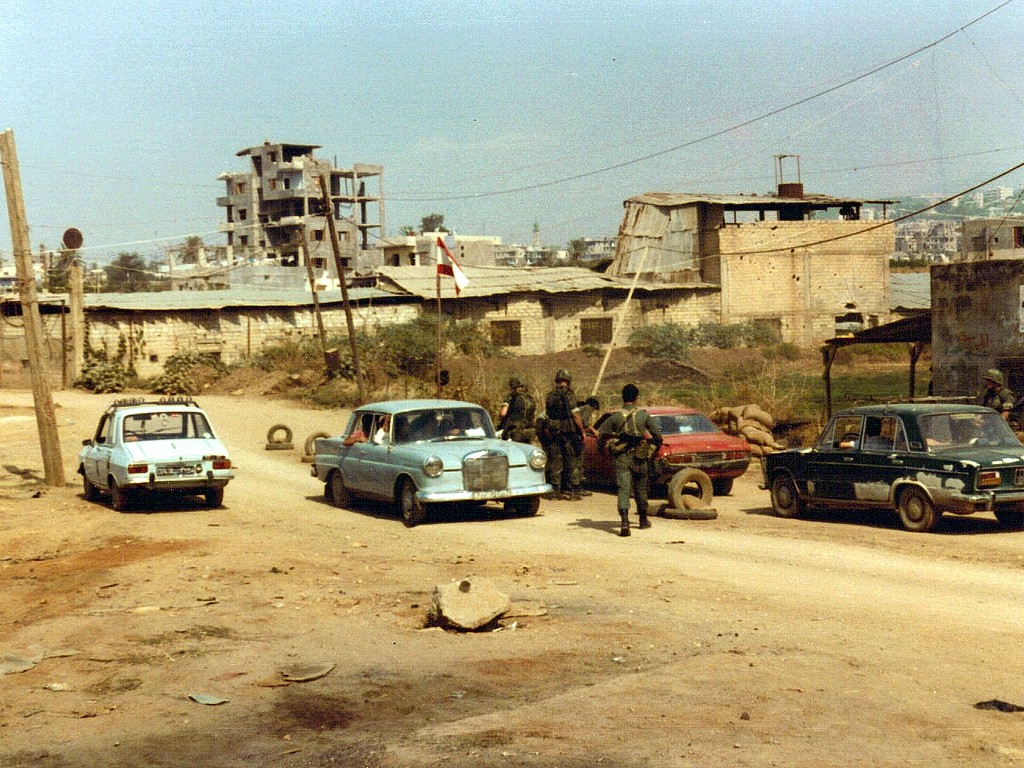
- A checkpoint in Beirut (1982)
- Date: 5 June 1982
- Meeting no.: 2,374
- Code: S/RES/508 (Document)
- Subject: Israel–Lebanon
- Voting summary: 15 voted for; None voted against; None abstained
- Result: Adopted

Security Council composition
- Permanent members: China; France; Soviet Union; United Kingdom; United States
- Non-permanent members: Guyana; Ireland; Jordan; Japan; Panama; Poland; Spain; Togo; Uganda; Zaire

United Nations Security Council resolution 508, adopted unanimously on 5 June 1982, after recalling previous resolutions including 425 (1978), 426 (1978) and 501 (1982), demanded an end of foreign hostilities taking place on Lebanese territory between the Palestine Liberation Organization and Israel. Israel stressed that they were upset that resolution 508 did not mention or suggest that the Palestine Liberation Organization were to blame for the attack on the Israeli ambassador.

The resolution went on to call for a ceasefire by 0600 local time on 6 June 1982, so that 490 (1981) can be respected. It also requested the Secretary-General to undertake all possible efforts to ensure the implementation of and compliance with this resolution and to report to the council as early as possible and not later than forty-eight hours after the adoption of this resolution.

== See also ==
- 1982 Lebanon War
- Israeli–Lebanese conflict
- Lebanese Civil War
- List of United Nations Security Council Resolutions 501 to 600 (1982–1987)
- Syrian occupation of Lebanon
- United Nations Interim Force in Lebanon
