= 1982 Lebanon War =

1982 Israeli invasion of Lebanon

- Part of the Palestinian insurgency in South Lebanon, the Lebanese Civil War, and the Israeli–Lebanese conflict
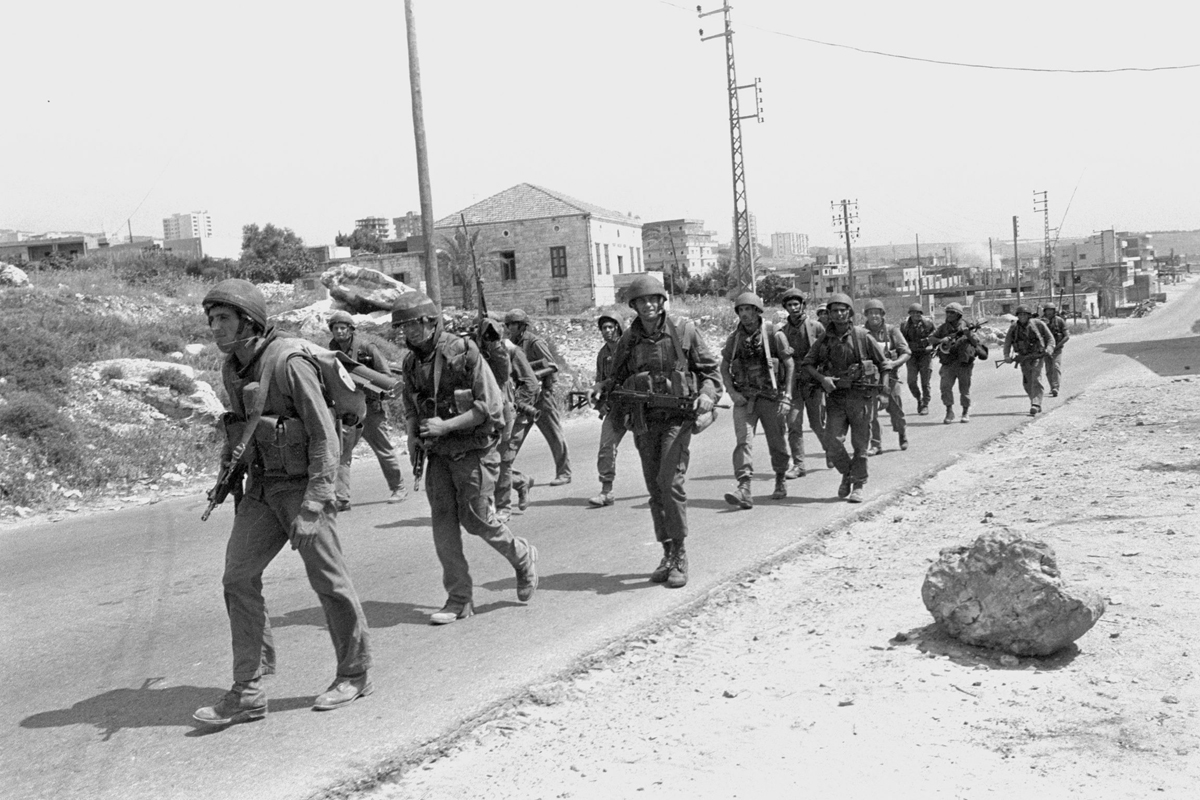
- Israeli troops invading Lebanon, 1982
Date	6 June – 29 September 1982 (end of Israeli operation) or 5 June 1985 (most Israeli forces withdrawn)
Location	Lebanon
Result	Inconclusive: Israeli tactical victories; Israeli strategic failures (Note: Sources:); PLO withdrawal from Lebanon; End of the Palestinian insurgency in South Lebanon; Beginning of the Southern Lebanon conflict
Territorial changes	Start of the Israeli occupation of Southern Lebanon

Belligerents
Israel; Lebanese Forces (16 September 1982); South Lebanon Army	PLO; Syria; Others: Lebanese National Resistance Front; Al-Mourabitoun; PKK; Hezbollah (Note: Formed from a merger of several Shia Islamist groups including: Islamic Amal, Islamic Dawa Party in Lebanon, Organization of the Oppressed on Earth and Revolutionary Justice Organization) (Islamic Jihad Organisation, after 1982); Support: Iran

Commanders and leaders
(Israel) Menachem Begin; (Israel) Ariel Sharon; (Israel) Rafael Eitan; (Israel) David Ivry; (Israel) Ze'ev Almog; (Israel) Yekutiel Adam †; Elie Hobeika; Saad Haddad	Yasser Arafat; Saad Sayel †; (Syria) Hafez al-Assad; (Syria) Mustafa Tlass; (Syria) Hikmat al-Shihabi; Walid Jumblatt; Ibrahim Kulaylat; Mahsum Korkmaz

Strength
Israel: 78,000 troops; 800 tanks; 1,500 APCs; 634 aircraft; LF: 30,000 troops; SLA: 5,000 troops; 97 tanks	Syria: 22,000 troops; 352 tanks; 300 APCs; 450 aircraft; 300 artillery pieces; 100 anti-aircraft guns; 125 SAM batteries; PLO: 15,000 troops; 80 tanks; 150 APCs; 350+ artillery pieces; 250+ anti-aircraft guns

Casualties and losses
Israel: 654 killed and 3,887 wounded (1982–85); 4 missing; 12 captured; 1 aircraft lost; 2 helicopters lost	PLO: 1,000–2,400 killed; 6,000 captured Syria: 1,200 killed; 296 captured; 300–350 tanks lost; 150 APCs lost; c. 100 artillery pieces lost; 82–86 aircraft lost; 12 helicopters lost; 29 SAM missile batteries lost
- Total casualties: 19,085 killed and 30,000 wounded. Civilians at Sabra-Shatila massacre: 800–3,500 killed. Also see Casualties below.

The 1982 Lebanon War, also called the Second Israeli invasion of Lebanon, began on 6 June 1982, when Israel invaded southern Lebanon. The invasion followed a series of attacks and counter-attacks between the Palestine Liberation Organization (PLO) operating in southern Lebanon and the Israel Defense Forces (IDF), which had caused civilian casualties on both sides of the border. The Israeli military operation, codenamed Operation Peace for Galilee, was launched after gunmen from the Abu Nidal Organization attempted to assassinate Shlomo Argov, Israel's ambassador to the United Kingdom. Israeli prime minister Menachem Begin blamed the PLO, using the incident as a casus belli. (Note: Note that scholars describe this variously as a pretext (i.e. an excuse for a pre-planned invasion) or as the actual provocation which sparked an otherwise avoidable conflict) It was the second invasion of Lebanon by Israel, following the 1978 South Lebanon conflict.

The Israelis sought to end Palestinian attacks from Lebanon, destroy the Palestine Liberation Organization (PLO) in the country, and install a pro-Israel Maronite Christian government. Israeli forces attacked and overran PLO positions in southern Lebanon and briefly clashed with the Syrian Army, who occupied most of the country's northeast. The Israeli military, together with the South Lebanon Army, seized control of the southern half of Lebanon and laid siege to the capital Beirut. The Lebanese Forces however, despite their clandestine alliance with Israel, refused to participate in the war against the PLO as their leader Bachir Gemayel viewed any direct involvement as assisting an invading army. Surrounded in West Beirut and subjected to heavy Israeli bombardment, the PLO and their allies negotiated a ceasefire with the aid of United States special envoy Philip Habib. The PLO, led by Yasser Arafat, were evacuated from Lebanon, overseen by a multinational peacekeeping force. By expelling the PLO, removing Syrian influence over Lebanon, and installing a pro-Israeli Christian government led by President Bachir Gemayel, the Israeli government hoped to sign a treaty that would give Israel "forty years of peace".

Following the assassination of Gemayel in September 1982, Israel's position in Beirut became untenable and the signing of a peace treaty became increasingly unlikely. There was outrage at the IDF's role in the Israeli-backed, Phalangist-perpetrated Sabra and Shatila massacre of Palestinians and Lebanese Shias. This stoked Israeli public disillusionment with the war. The IDF withdrew from Beirut and ended its operation on 29 September 1982. The May 17 Agreement of 1983 ended the state of war between Israel and Lebanon, and provided for an Israeli withdrawal from the country. Amid rising casualties from guerrilla attacks, the IDF retreated south of the Awali river on 3 September 1983.

From February to April 1985, the Israeli military undertook a phased withdrawal to its "South Lebanon security zone" along the border. The Israeli occupation saw the emergence of Hezbollah, an Iranian-backed Shia Islamist group. It waged a guerrilla war against the Israeli occupation until the IDF's final withdrawal from Lebanon in 2000. In Israel, the 1982 invasion is also known as the First Lebanon War. (Note: The 2006 Lebanon War is regarded as the "Second Lebanon War" in Israel and the 2024 Israeli invasion of Lebanon is regarded as the Third Lebanon War by some Israeli sources.)

== Background ==
During the 1948 Palestine war, 730,000 Palestinians fled or were forced to leave by Zionist forces, (Note: Before the establishment of Israel, Palestinians were expelled by Zionist paramilitaries; after the establishment of Israel, Palestinians were expelled by the Israeli army itself) of whom 100,000 arrived in Lebanon. Most of the guerrillas would be recruited from Palestinian refugee camps. By 1969, this population had grown to 235,000 as a result of natural population growth and immigration, including Palestinians who fled or were expelled by Israel during the 1967 war. On the eve of the 1982 Israeli invasion, the Palestinian population in Lebanon was 375,000.

The 1967 Six-Day War stimulated the growth of the Palestinian fedayeen (guerrillas). After 1967, the number of armed Palestinians increased from 200 to 2,000 and by 1968 it had reached 15,000.

=== PLO's objectives ===
Palestinian guerrilla action intended to serve as a war of national liberation for Palestinians. In 1968, PLO's objective was to establish a single democratic state in all of historical Palestine with equal rights for Jews, Muslims and Christians. It was around this time that Palestinians began to conduct raids into Israel. By 1977, the objective had evolved to establishing a Palestinian state in the West Bank and Gaza Strip, alongside Israel.

=== Relocation of PLO from Jordan to South Lebanon ===
In 1970, a large influx of Palestinians from Jordan went into Lebanon after the Black September conflict. This caused an additional demographic imbalance within Lebanese society, and affected its democratic institutions established earlier by the National Pact.

By 1975, the refugees numbered more than 300,000 and the PLO in effect created an unofficial state-within-a-state, particularly in Southern Lebanon, which then played an important role in the Lebanese Civil War. There had been continual violence near the Lebanon-Israel border between Israel and the PLO, starting from 1968; this increased following the relocation of PLO bases to Lebanon after the civil war in Jordan.

=== Lebanese Civil War ===
==== Incidents 1975–1980 ====
The violence between Israel and the PLO peaked during Operation Litani in 1978, provoked by the Coastal Road Massacre which was carried out by Palestinian militants. The United Nations Interim Force in Lebanon (UNIFIL) was created after the incursion, following the adoption of United Nations Security Council Resolution 425 in March 1978 to confirm Israeli withdrawal from Southern Lebanon, restore international peace and security, and help the government of Lebanon restore its effective authority in the area.

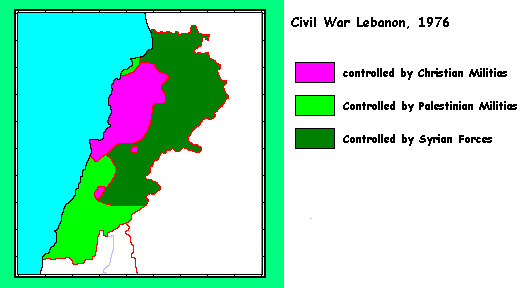
A map showing the power balance in Lebanon, 1976: Dark Green – controlled by Syria: Purple – controlled by Maronite groups; Light Green – controlled by Palestinian militias

As early as 1976, Israel had been assisting Lebanese Christian militias in their sporadic battles against the PLO. During Operation Litani in 1978, Israel established a security zone in southern Lebanon with mostly Christian inhabitants, in which they began to supply training and arms to Christian militias which would later form the South Lebanese Army. But Israel's main partner was to be the Maronite Phalange party, whose paramilitary was led by Bashir Gemayel, a rising figure in Lebanese politics. Gemayel's strategy during the early stages of the Lebanese Civil War was to provoke the Syrians into retaliatory attacks on Christians, such that Israel could not ignore.

In 1978, Menachem Begin declared that Israel would not allow a genocide of Lebanese Christians, while refusing direct intervention. Hundreds of Lebanese militiamen began to train in Israel, at the IDF Staff and Command College. The relationship between Israel and the Maronites began to grow into a political-strategic alliance, and members of the Israeli government like Ariel Sharon began to conceive of a plan to install a pro-Israel Christian government in Lebanon, as it was known that Bashir wanted to remove the PLO and all Palestinian refugees in the country.

From June to December 1980, the United Nations Interim Force in Lebanon (UNIFIL) recorded an increase in activities along the border zone. No attacks by Palestinian forces on Israel were recorded, while the IDF incursions across the armistice line into Lebanon increased markedly, with minefields being laid, gun posts established, and generally involving numerous violations of Lebanese air-space and territorial waters. This was formally protested by the Lebanese government to the UN Security Council and General Assembly in several communications as violations by Israel of United Nations Security Council Resolution 425. During the same period Israel protested numerous attacks by Palestinian forces, unrelated to the Lebanese border zone.

==== 1981 events and cease-fire ====
In his report for the period of 12 December 1980 to 12 June 1981 on UNIFIL activities, the Security Council Secretary General noted that infiltrations into the border zone by Palestinian armed forces had decreased relative to the previous six months. Indeed, the PLO had recognized their vulnerable position, and avoided overtly provoking Israel. In contrast the IDF had launched various attacks on Lebanese territory often in support of the Lebanese Christian militia. In doing so Israel had violated UN Security Council resolution 425 on hundreds of occasions [paragraph 58]. Where the initiator(s) of attacks could be identified in the report, in 15 cases Palestinian militants were to blame while on 23 occasions the Militia and/or the IDF were the instigators, the latter also being responsible for the most violent confrontation of the period on 27 April [paragraph 52].

From 16 June to 10 December 1981, a relative quiet was reported continuing from 29 May 1981 until 10 July. This was broken when "Israeli aircraft resumed strikes against targets in southern Lebanon north of the UNIFIL area. (The Israeli strikes) led to exchanges of heavy firing between armed elements (Palestinians), on the one hand, and IDF and the de facto forces (Christian Militia) on the other. On 13 and 14 July, widespread Israeli air-strikes continued. Armed elements (Palestinians) fired into the enclave and northern Israel." Israeli-initiated attacks had led to rocket and artillery fire on northern Israel. This pattern continued in the coming days.

Israel renewed its air strikes in an attempt to trigger a war that would allow it to drive out the PLO and restore peace to the region. On 17 July, the Israel Air Force launched a massive attack on PLO buildings in downtown Beirut. "Perhaps as many as three hundred died, and eight hundred were wounded, the great majority of them civilians." The Israeli army also heavily targeted PLO positions in south Lebanon without success in suppressing Palestinian rocket launchers and guns.

As a result, thousands of Israeli citizens who lived near the Lebanese border headed south. There patterns of Israeli-initiated airstrikes and Palestinian retaliations with attacks on northern Israel are in contrast with the official Israeli version "A ceasefire declared in July 1981 was broken: the terrorists continued to carry out attacks against Israeli targets in Israel and abroad, and the threat to the northern settlements became unbearable."

On 24 July 1981, United States Undersecretary of State Philip Habib brokered a ceasefire badly needed by both parties, the best achievable result from negotiations via intermediaries, aimed at complying with the decisions of UN Security Council resolution 490. The process was complicated, requiring

shuttle diplomacy between Damascus, Jerusalem, and Beirut, United States. Philip Habib concluded a ceasefire across the Lebanon border between Israel and the PLO. Habib could not talk to the PLO directly because of Kissinger's directive, so he used a Saudi member of the royal family as mediator. The agreement was oral – nothing could be written down since Israel and the PLO did not recognize each other and refused to negotiate with each other – but they came up with a truce. ... Thus the border between Lebanon and Israel suddenly stabilized after over a decade of routine bombing.

Between July 1981 and June 1982, as a result of the Habib ceasefire, the Lebanese-Israeli border "enjoyed a state of calm unprecedented since 1968." But the 'calm' was tense. US Secretary of State, Alexander Haig filed a report with US President Ronald Reagan on Saturday 30 January 1982 that revealed Secretary Haig's fear that Israel might, at the slightest provocation, start a war against Lebanon.

The 'calm' lasted nine months. Then, on 21 April 1982, after a landmine killed an Israeli officer while he was visiting a South Lebanese Army gun emplacement in Taibe, Lebanon, the Israeli Air Force attacked the Palestinian-controlled coastal town of Damour, killing 23 people. Fisk reports further on this incident: "The Israelis did not say what the soldier was doing ... I discovered that he was visiting one of Haddad's artillery positions (Christian militia) and that the mine could have been lain [sic] as long ago as 1978, perhaps even by the Israelis themselves".

On 9 May 1982, Israeli aircraft again attacked targets in Lebanon. Later that same day, UNIFIL observed the firing of rockets from Palestinian positions in the Tyre region into northern Israel, but none of the projectiles hit Israeli towns – the gunners had been ordered to miss. Major-General Erskine (Ghana), Chief of Staff of UNTSO reported to the Secretary-General and the Security Council (S/14789, S/15194) that from August 1981 to May 1982, inclusive, there were 2096 violations of Lebanese airspace and 652 violations of Lebanese territorial waters. The freedom of movement of UNIFIL personnel and UNTSO observers within the enclave remained restricted due to the actions of Amal and the South Lebanon Army under Major Saad Haddad's leadership with the backing of Israeli military forces.

Prior to establishing ceasefire in July 1981, U.N. Secretary-General Kurt Waldheim noted: "After several weeks of relative quiet in the area, a new cycle of violence has begun and has, in the past week, steadily intensified." He further stated: "There have been heavy civilian casualties in Lebanon; there have been civilian casualties in Israel as well. I deeply deplore the extensive human suffering caused by these developments." The President of the U.N. Security Council, Ide Oumarou of Niger, expressed "deep concern at the extent of the loss of life and the scale of the destruction caused by the deplorable events that have been taking place for several days in Lebanon".

==== Immediate causes ====
From the ceasefire, established in July 1981, until the start of the war, the Israeli government reported 270 militant attacks by the PLO in Israel, the occupied territories, and the Jordanian and Lebanese border (in addition to 20 attacks on Israeli interests abroad).

In Ariel Sharon's biography by his son, Gilad Sharon, the author referring to the Habib ceasefire, comments: "However, the agreement was explicit only regarding preventing terror from Lebanon, which is why my father encouraged the cabinet not to accept the offer as presented by the Americans."

The cease-fire, as both the PLO and the Americans saw it, did not include terror attacks stemming from Lebanon and carried out against Jews in Europe and other locales. In a meeting my father had with Alexander Haig and Philip Habib on 25 May 1982, Habib repeated what he had already said many times before: "Terrorist attacks against Israelis and Jews in Europe are not included in the cease-fire agreement.

Arafat pressured the radical factions to maintain the ceasefire because he did not wish to provoke the Israelis into an all-out attack. The PLO acceptance of the ceasefire had led to dissension even within Fatah itself. A faction sympathetic to Abu Nidal forced a military confrontation, with accompanying arrests and executions — an event unprecedented in PLO internal disputes'. Arafat even attempted to distance himself from Palestinian unrest on the West Bank to prevent an Israeli attack.

In contrast, Begin, Sharon and Eitan were searching for any excuse to neutralize their military opponents through a breach of the ceasefire. They believed that Arafat was buying time to build up his conventional forces. The Israeli interpretation of the conditions for the ceasefire placed responsibility for any act of Palestinian violence on Arafat's shoulders. It presumed that Arafat had complete control, not only over all factions within the PLO such as the rejectionist Popular Front of George Habash, but also over those outside such as Abu Nidal's Fatah Revolutionary Council and Ahmed Jibril's Popular Front — General Command.

In Begin's eyes, the ceasefire was not geographically limited to the Lebanese border. He argued that if Palestinian terrorism struck internationally, then this too would be regarded as a breach of the ceasefire. Begin thus took a stand-off in a local battle as applying to the entire war anywhere in the Middle East or any incident internationally.

Eitan commented that there was no difference if a militant threw a grenade in Gaza or fired a shell at a Northern settlement — all such acts broke the ceasefire. Sharon similarly did not wish to draw distinctions between different Palestinian factions, since all blame had to be attached to the PLO. He dismissed attempts at more rational evaluation as masking the real issue. In a speech to a Young Herut conference in April 1982, he accused those who tried to take a more objective standpoint of erecting 'a protective wall around the PLO inside and outside Israel'.

Further support comes from George Ball, that the PLO had observed the ceasefire. Israel, he said, continued looking for the "internationally recognized provocation" that Secretary of State Alexander Haig said would be necessary to obtain American support for an Israeli invasion of Lebanon. Secretary Haig's critics have accused him of "greenlighting" the Israeli Invasion of Lebanon in June 1982. Haig denies this and says he urged restraint. In the biography of ceasefire broker Philip Habib, Alexander Haig is cited as leaving the worst impression of all in the lead up to Israel's Lebanon invasion:

Haig thus comes off very badly: not a team player, not able to keep the rest of the administration informed of what was going on beforehand, not willing to tell anyone in the White House why Sharon was so confident during the invasion, hoping that Reagan's special envoy would fail in his mission, and having little sense of what the national security of the United States required—which was not a confrontation between Israeli and Soviet tanks on the road from Beirut to Damascus.

The American reaction was that they would not apply any undue pressure on Israel to quit Lebanon as the Israeli presence in Lebanon may prove to be a catalyst for the disparate groups of Lebanon to make common cause against both Syrian and Israeli forces. Haig's analysis, which Ronald Reagan agreed with, was that this uniting of Lebanese groups would allow President Elias Sarkis to reform the Lebanese central Government and give the Palestinian refugees Lebanese citizenship. Additional evidence that the United States approved the Israeli invasion comes from longtime CIA analyst Charles Cogan, who says that he was in the room during a May 1982 meeting in The Pentagon during which Sharon explained to Secretary of Defense Caspar Weinberger "in great detail how the Israelis were going to invade Lebanon ... Weinberger just sat there and said nothing."

According to Avi Shlaim, the real driving force behind the Israeli invasion to Lebanon was the defense minister Ariel Sharon. One of his aims was the destruction of PLO military infrastructure in Lebanon and undermining it as a political organization, in order to facilitate the absorption of the West Bank by Israel. The second aim was the establishment of the Maronite government in Lebanon, headed by Bashir Gemayel and signing the peace treaty between two countries, the third aim was the expelling of the Syrian Army from Lebanon. Also, according to Shlaim, with the completion of Israeli withdrawals from Sinai in March 1982, under the terms of the Egyptian-Israeli Peace Treaty, the Likud-led government of Israel hardened its attitude to the Arab world and became more aggressive.

According to Zeev Maoz in Defending the Holy Land: A Critical Analysis of Israel's National Security and Foreign Policy, the goals of the war were primarily developed by then Minister of Defense Ariel Sharon and were fourfold:

1. "Destroy the PLO infrastructure in Lebanon, including the PLO headquarters in Beirut."
2. "Drive Syrian forces out of Lebanon."
3. "Install a Christian-dominated government in Lebanon, with Bashir Gemayel as President."
4. "Sign a peace treaty with the Lebanese government that would solidify the informal Israeli-Christian alliance and convert it into a binding agreement."

George Ball testified before the US Senate's Foreign Affairs Committee that Sharon's long-term strategy, as revealed in conversations, was one of "squeezing the Palestinians out of the West Bank . .allowing only enough of them to remain for work."

The military plan with the code name "Big Pines", prepared by IDF, envisaged invasion to Lebanon up to the highway Damascus-Beirut and linking with Maronite forces. It was first presented to Israeli cabinet on 20 December 1981 by Begin, but rejected by the majority of ministers. According to Avi Shlaim, Sharon and chief of staff Rafael Eitan, realizing that there was no chance in persuading the cabinet to approve a large-scale operation in Lebanon, adopted a different tactic and intended to implement "Operation Big Pines" in stages by manipulating enemy provocations and Israeli responses.

On 3 June 1982 Israel's ambassador to the United Kingdom, Shlomo Argov was shot and seriously wounded in London by militants belonging to the Iraqi-backed Abu Nidal militant organization. The attack was ordered by the Iraqi Intelligence Service. Following the attack, the assassins drove to the Iraqi embassy in London, where they deposited the weapon. In his memoirs, Sharon stated that the attack was "merely the spark that lit the fuse".

Israeli prime Minister Begin used this as the "internationally recognized provocation" necessary to invade Lebanon. The fact that the Abu Nidal organization was the longtime rival of PLO, that its head was condemned to death by the PLO court, and that the British police reported that PLO leaders were on the "hit list" of the attackers did not deter Begin. Iraq's motives for the assassination attempt may have been to punish Israel for its destruction of Iraq's nuclear reactor in June 1981, and to provoke a war in Lebanon that Iraqi leaders calculated would be detrimental to the rival Ba'ath regime in Syria—whether Syria intervened to help the PLO or not!

At the Israeli Cabinet meeting the following day, both Begin and Eitan belittled intelligence reports that the likely culprit was the Abu Nidal group. Begin cut short his own advisor on terrorism, arguing that all Palestinian militants were members of the PLO, while Eitan ridiculed the intelligence staff for splitting hairs and demanded to strike at the PLO. Yet Abu Nidal had broken with Arafat and PLO in 1974 over a fundamental principle: namely, that the Palestinian national movement would adopt a phased piecemeal approach to secure a Palestinian state and embark on a political path. The lack of understanding of the difference between Palestinian groups and the total ignorance of Palestinian politics on the part an overwhelming majority of Israelis and Jews played into the hands of those who did not wish to distinguish between the PLO and the Abu Nidal group. Thus, instead of an initiative to locate the Abu Nidal group in Damascus or Baghdad, the plan to invade Lebanon was activated.

The PLO denied complicity in the attack, but Israel retaliated with punishing air and artillery strikes against Palestinian targets in Lebanon, including the PLO camps. Sabra and the Shatila refugee camp were bombed for four hours and the local "Gaza" hospital was hit there. About 200 people were killed during these attacks. The PLO hit back firing rockets at northern Israel causing considerable damage and some loss of life. According to another source, twenty villages were targeted in Galilee and 3 Israelis were wounded.

According to Shlaim, Yasser Arafat, at that time being in Saudi Arabia, told the Americans through the Saudis that he was willing to suspend cross-border shelling. But that message was disregarded by the Israeli government. President Reagan also sent a message to Begin urging him not to widen the attack.

On 4 June the Israeli cabinet authorized a large scale invasion.

A Mossad document declassified in 2022 revealed that planning for the invasion began in mid-1981 and that the Lebanese Christian leader Pierre Gemayel was informed of it in January 1982. According to the document, Israel's Lebanon policy was mostly dictated by the military rather than the government.

== Timeline ==
=== Invasion ===
Troop movements between June 6 and June 25

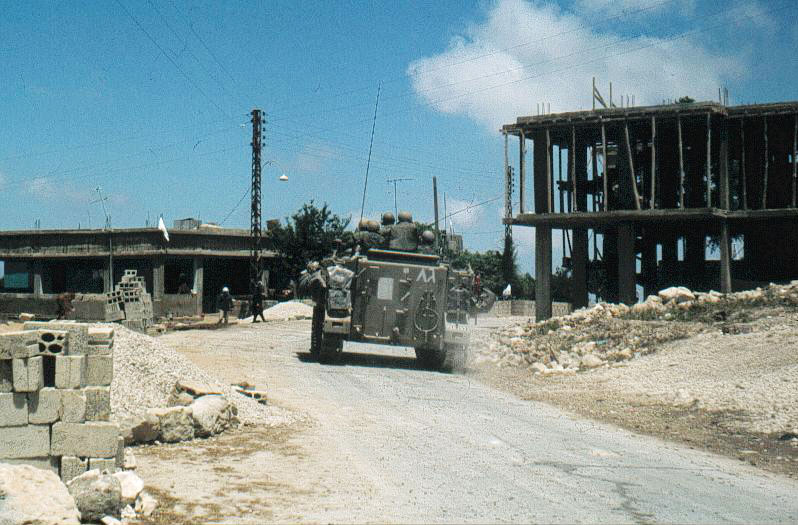
An Israeli armored personnel carrier in south Lebanon

On 6 June 1982, Israeli forces under direction of Defense Minister Ariel Sharon launched a three-pronged invasion of southern Lebanon in "Operation Peace for Galilee". Roughly 60,000 troops and more than 800 tanks, heavily supported by aircraft, attack helicopters, artillery, and missile boats, crossed the Israel–Lebanon border in three areas. Simultaneously, Israeli armor, paratroopers, and naval commandos set sail in amphibious landing ships from Ashdod towards the Lebanese coast north of Sidon. Israel's publicly stated objective was to push PLO forces back 40 kilometers (25 mi) to the north.

The westernmost Israeli force was to advance up the coastal road to Tyre. Its mission was to bypass Tyre and destroy three PLO camps in the area, then move up the coast towards Sidon and Damour, while Israeli forces would simultaneously conduct an amphibious landing north of Sidon to cut off the retreat of PLO forces there. In the center, two divisions were to advance both north and south of the high ground overlooked by Beaufort Castle, which was being used as a PLO stronghold, and take the road junction at Nabatieh, while an elite reconnaissance battalion was to take the castle itself.

The two divisions were then to split, with one heading west to link up with the forces along the coast, and another towards Jezzine and from there along the right flank of Syrian forces in the Bekaa Valley. The easternmost Israeli force, the largest of the three, advanced into the Bekaa Valley. Its mission was to prevent Syrian reinforcements from being sent and to stop Syrian forces from attempting to interfere with the operation on the coastal road.

=== Advance on Beirut ===
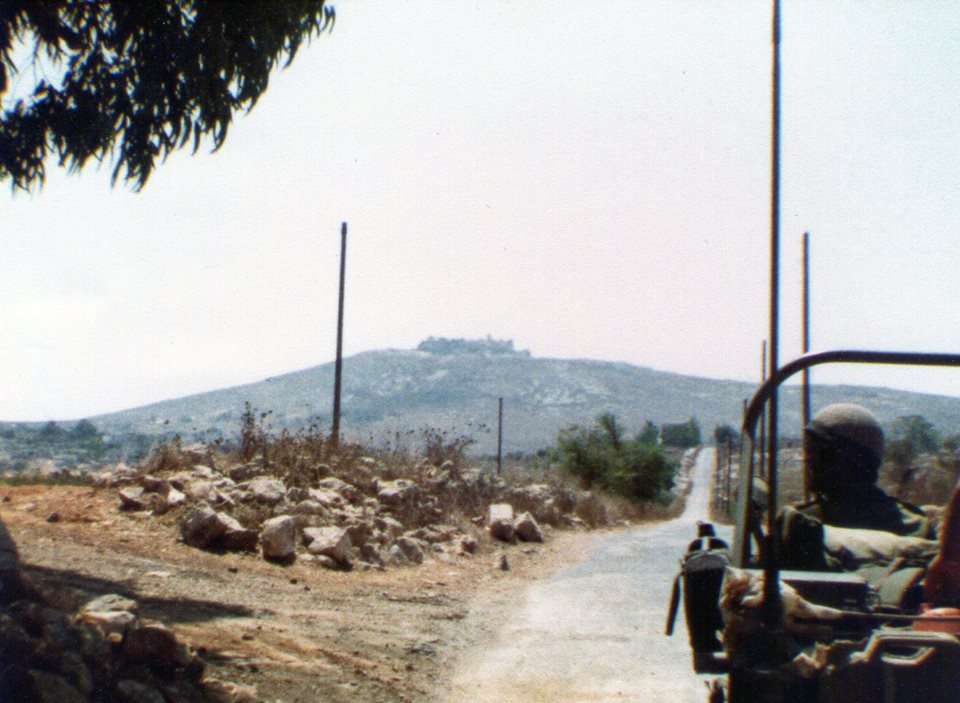
Israeli troops driving towards Beaufort Castle, 1982

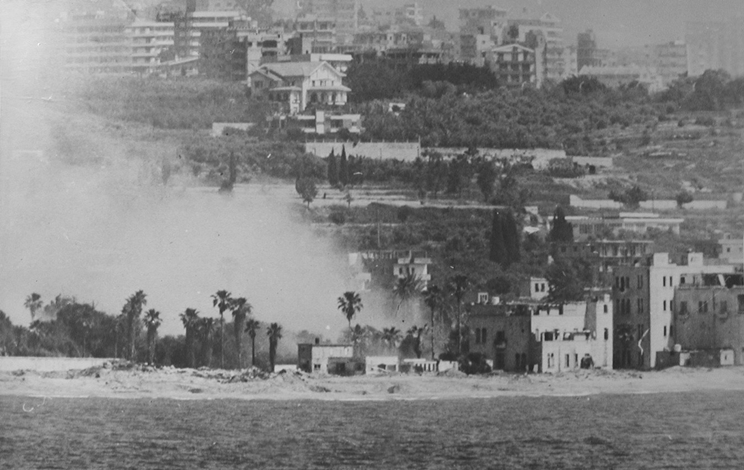
An Israeli bombardment of a PLO position on the Lebanese coast

The advance along the coastal road was preceded by heavy artillery bombardment and airstrikes, but quickly became bogged down and was soon behind schedule. The narrowness of the road forced a slow advance, and Israeli armor became stuck in a large traffic jam. Several armored vehicles were knocked out by PLO fighters with anti-tank weaponry hiding in three groves along the road. One of the lead battalions, which was supposed to bypass Tyre and establish a blocking position to the north of the city, made a wrong turn and found itself in the center of the city, where it was ambushed.

At eight in the evening the force crossed the Litani River and headed towards Sidon. In the central sector, the mission went as planned. The two Israeli divisions bypassed Beaufort Castle on both sides. Although an order to postpone the capture of Beaufort Castle was issued, it did not reach Israeli forces in time to prevent the operation, and Israeli troops of the Golani Brigade captured the castle in the fiercely-fought Battle of the Beaufort. The road junction at Nabatieh was also secured by the end of the first day.

Meanwhile, the easternmost force penetrated into the Bekaa Valley and bore down on the Syrian positions. One division bypassed Mount Hermon via a road bulldozed by Israeli military engineers and cleared the town of Hasbaiya before swinging right and advancing towards Rachaiya. Though Israeli forces halted in the floor of the valley, they were flanking Syrian forces from the east and west. The Syrians put up minimal resistance and conducted some harassing artillery fire. By the end of the first day, the operation had gone almost entirely according to plan, though the advance along the coastal road was behind schedule.

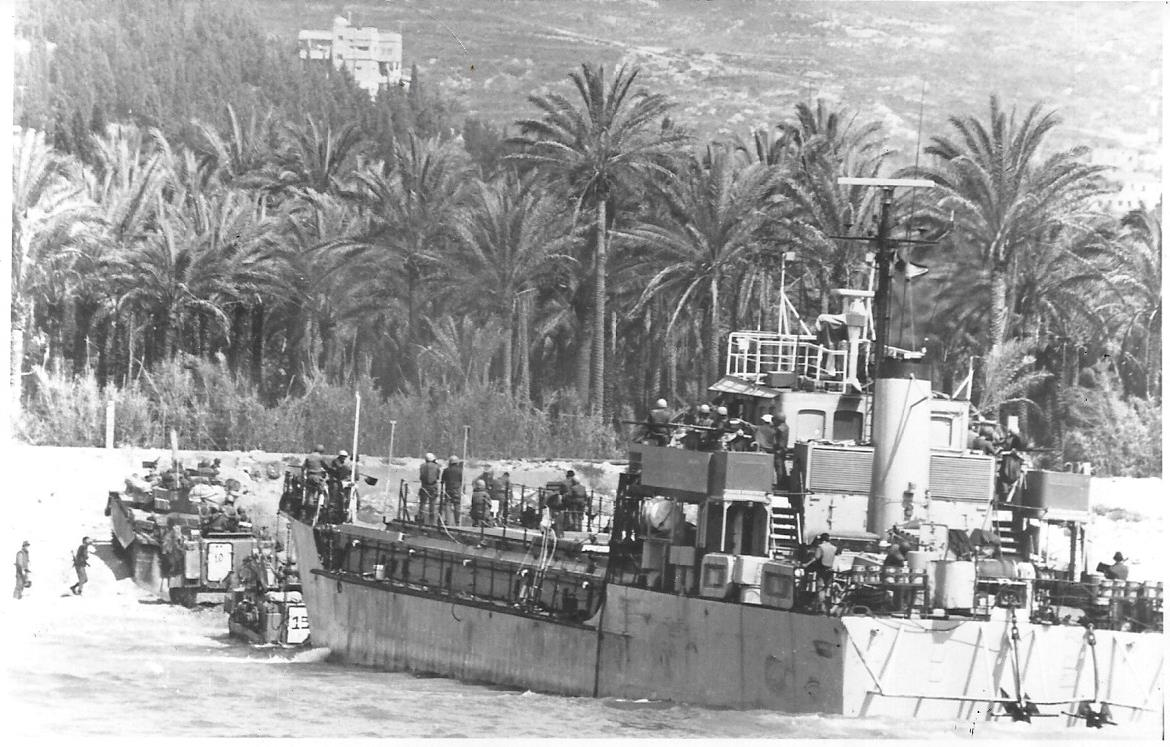
Israeli armored vehicles disembark from a landing craft during an amphibious landing

Despite the delays, the Israeli advance along the coastal road continued steadily. This advance was supported by heavy air attacks against PLO positions that included the use of cluster bombs. Israeli missile boats also employed 76mm cannons to destroy targets along the coast, firing 3,500 shells during ten days of fighting. Israeli armor continued to advance towards Sidon, while other Israeli infantry attacked the three Palestinian refugee camps in the area that were used as PLO bases: Rashidiya, Burj ash-Shamali, and al-Bass.

The camps were all crisscrossed with networks of bunkers, trenches, and firing positions. The Israelis took each camp section by section using the same method: warnings were blared by loudspeaker urging civilians to leave, before air and artillery bombardment commenced, followed by an infantry assault. Israeli infantry had to engage in fierce urban combat in narrow streets. The PLO defenders put up strong resistance and sometimes used civilians as human shields. It took four days of combat to secure Rashidiya and three days to secure the other two camps.

At the same time, an Israeli amphibious operation was conducted north of Sidon, beginning with a diversionary bombardment of targets away from the landing zone by missile boats and aircraft. Two groups of commandos from the Shayetet 13 naval commando unit then came ashore to probe enemy defenses and secure the landing site, one of which swam to the mouth of the Awali River and another which came ashore on the landing beach in rubber dinghies. After a brief gunbattle with armed Palestinians, the main landings began, with paratroopers coming ashore in rubber dinghies to establish a beachhead followed by three landing craft that unloaded troops and armor. Over the following days, the three landing ships moved between Israel and Lebanon, shuttling more troops and armor onto the beachhead.

The PLO response was limited to ineffective mortar fire, while Israeli missile boats and aircraft attacked Palestinian positions in response. In total, about 2,400 soldiers and 400 tanks and armored personnel carriers were landed. From the beach, these forces advanced on Sidon, supported by naval gunfire from missile boats. At the same time, Israeli forces in the central sector advanced towards Jezzine while those in the eastern sector remained in place, but began setting up heavy artillery positions that put Syrian SAM units in artillery range.

Meanwhile, Israeli forces advancing along the coastal road reached the outskirts of Sidon, but were delayed by heavy resistance in the main streets and the Ain al-Hilweh refugee camp on the southeastern edge of the city, and after an attempt by paratroopers to capture the city center and secure the south–north route through the city failed, the city was bypassed via a detour through the hills to the east. After linking up with the forces that had landed north of Sidon, while another force of paratroopers and armor with heavy air and artillery support advanced through central Sidon and cleared a south–north route through the city in fierce fighting. Another Israeli division passed through the city to link up with the forces north of Sidon.

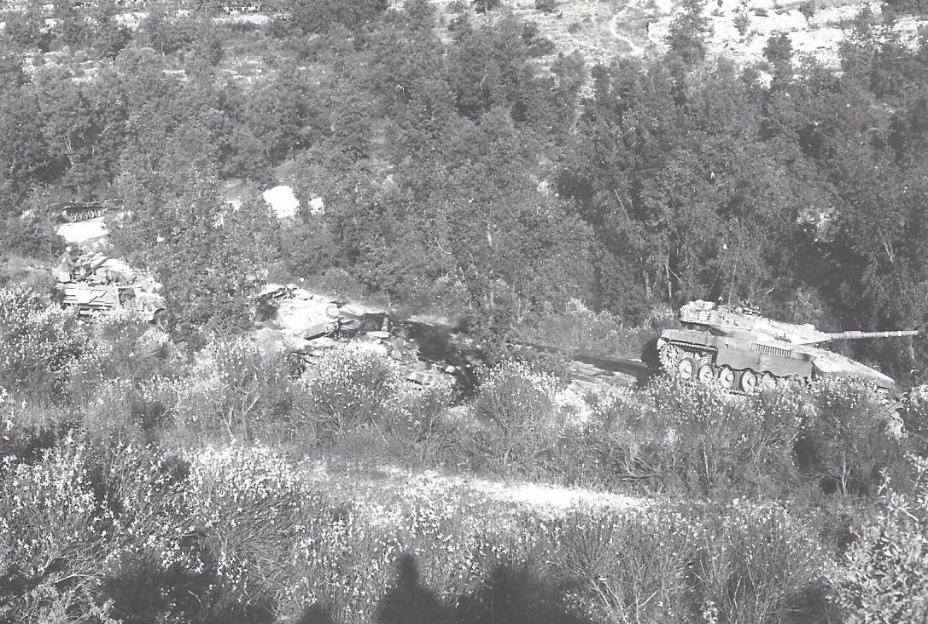
An Israeli tank advances past destroyed Syrian tanks during the Battle of Jezzine

In the center, most Israeli forces advancing towards Jezzine bypassed the town to continue advancing towards the main highway in the area, leaving a blocking force in the area that was soon joined by an armored brigade. Fighting broke out in Jezzine between the Israelis and Syrian forces holding the town. In the Battle of Jezzine, Israeli forces consisting of two tank battalions supported by a reconnaissance company and engineering platoon took Jezzine in a fierce daylong battle against a Syrian battalion, then repulsed a fierce counterattack by dozens of Syrian commandos during the night in combat that lasted until dawn. Meanwhile, Israeli forces continued to advance along the Syrians' right flank.

Israeli forces advancing along the coast also completed the capture of Sidon. Paratroopers attacked the Kasbah while a combined force of Golani Brigade infantry and tanks attacked Ain al-Hilweh. The Kasbah was secured in three days; the paratroopers advanced cautiously and managed to take it without suffering any casualties. However, the fighting at Ain al-Hilweh was to prove some of the fiercest of the entire war. The camp was heavily fortified and defended by PLO fighters and Islamic fundamentalists.

The defenders fought fiercely over every alley and house, with civilians who wanted to surrender shot by the fundamentalists. The Israeli advance was slow and was supported by massive air and artillery bombardment. The IDF employed its previous tactics of urging civilians to leave with loudspeakers before attacking an area. It took about eight days for the camp to fall, with the battle culminating in a last stand by the defenders at the camp mosque, which was blown up by the IDF.

In an effort to establish air superiority and greater freedom of action, the Israeli Air Force launched Operation Mole Cricket 19 on 9 June. During the course of the operation, the Israeli Air Force scored a dramatic victory over the Syrians, shooting down 29 Syrian planes and also destroying 17 Syrian anti-aircraft missile batteries, employing electronic warfare methods to confuse and jam the Syrian radars. The Israelis' only known losses were a single UAV shot down and two fighter jets damaged. Later that night, an Israeli air attack destroyed a Syrian armored brigade moving south from Baalbek, and the IAF attacked and destroyed six more Syrian SAM batteries the following day. The easternmost Israeli force, which had been stationary, resumed its advance forward up the Bekaa Valley.

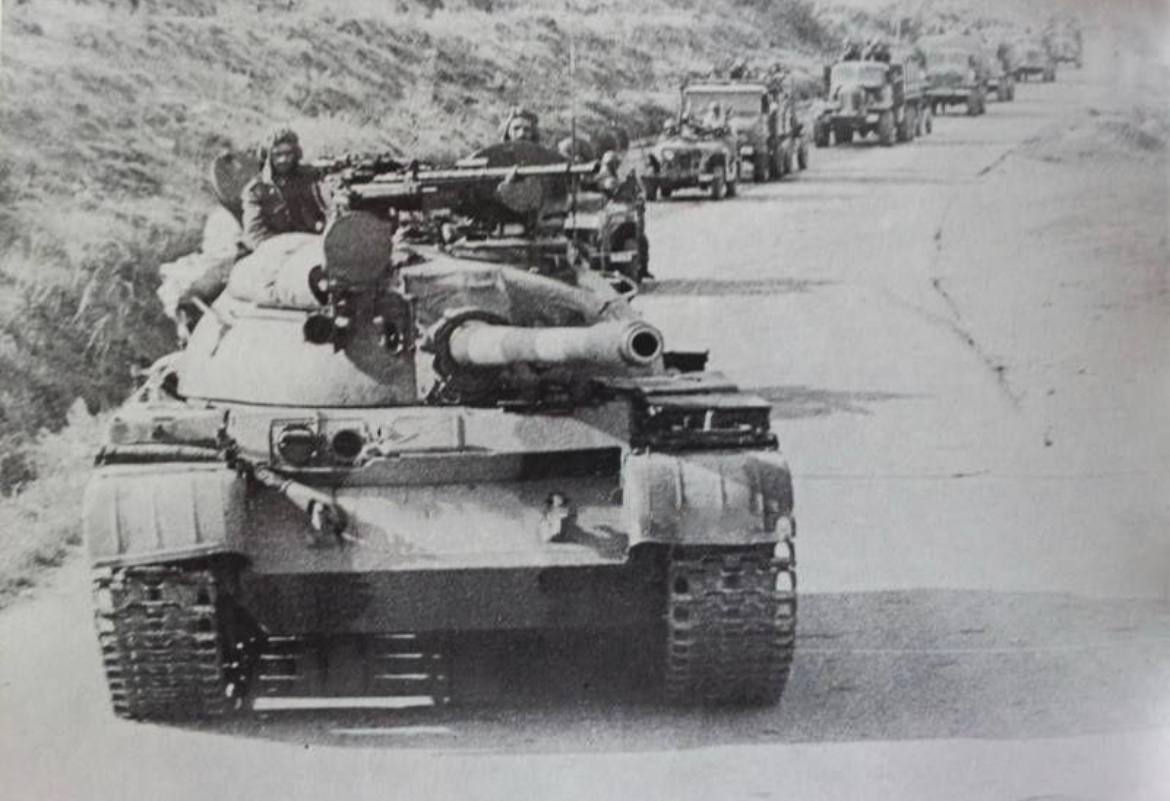
Column of Syrian tanks and trucks headed by a T-55 tank

In the center, Israeli forces were ambushed by the Syrians as they approached Ain Zhalta, and were pinned down by Syrian forces firing from superior positions. The Israelis were bogged down, and an infantry battalion was sent in by helicopter to reinforce them. The town was only captured after a two-day armored and infantry battle. The battle cost the Israelis 11 killed and 4 tanks, while the Syrians lost approximately 100 killed and 35 tanks. After Ain Zhalta fell, the Israelis advanced to the town of Ain Dara, which overlooked the Beirut-Damascus highway, and captured the heights overlooking the town.

Along the road to Ain Dara, the Israelis encountered Syrian tank and commando units, and found themselves bogged down as the Syrians took advantage of the terrain. The Israelis called in air support, and Israeli attack helicopters that took advantage of ravines to fly in low beneath their targets to gain an element of surprise proved particularly effective against Syrian tanks. After a daylong battle, the Israelis had surrounded Ain Dara and were in a position to strike on the highway.

On 10 June 1982, the Israeli air force mistook a column of IDF Nahal Brigade forces for a Syrian commando unit. An IAF F-4 Phantom attacked the Battalion 931, advancing in open APCs in south-eastern Lebanon with cluster ammunition. The unit suffered 24 fatalities and 108 wounded, with a further 30 soldiers shell-shocked.

In the east, Israeli forces advanced along four main routes towards Joub Jannine, along both sides of the Qaraoun reservoir. The Syrians resisted fiercely. Syrian infantrymen armed with anti-tank weapons staged ambushes against Israeli tanks, and Syrian Gazelle helicopters armed with HOT missiles proved effective against Israeli armor. However, the Israelis managed to capture the valley floor, and the Syrians retreated. The Israelis captured Rachaiya, advanced through Kfar Quoq, and took the outskirts of Yanta. Joub Jannine also fell to the Israelis. The extent of Israeli advances ensured that Syrian reinforcements were blocked from deploying west of the Qaraoun reservoir.

An Israeli armored battalion then probed past Joub Jannine to the town of Sultan Yacoub, and was ambushed by Syrian forces lying in wait. In the Battle of Sultan Yacoub, the Israelis fought fiercely to extricate themselves, and called in reinforcements and artillery fire to cover the withdrawal. After six hours, the Israelis managed to retreat, having lost 10 tanks and 3 armored personnel carriers. In addition, another major air battle erupted in which the Israeli Air Force shot down 25 Syrian jets and 4 helicopters.

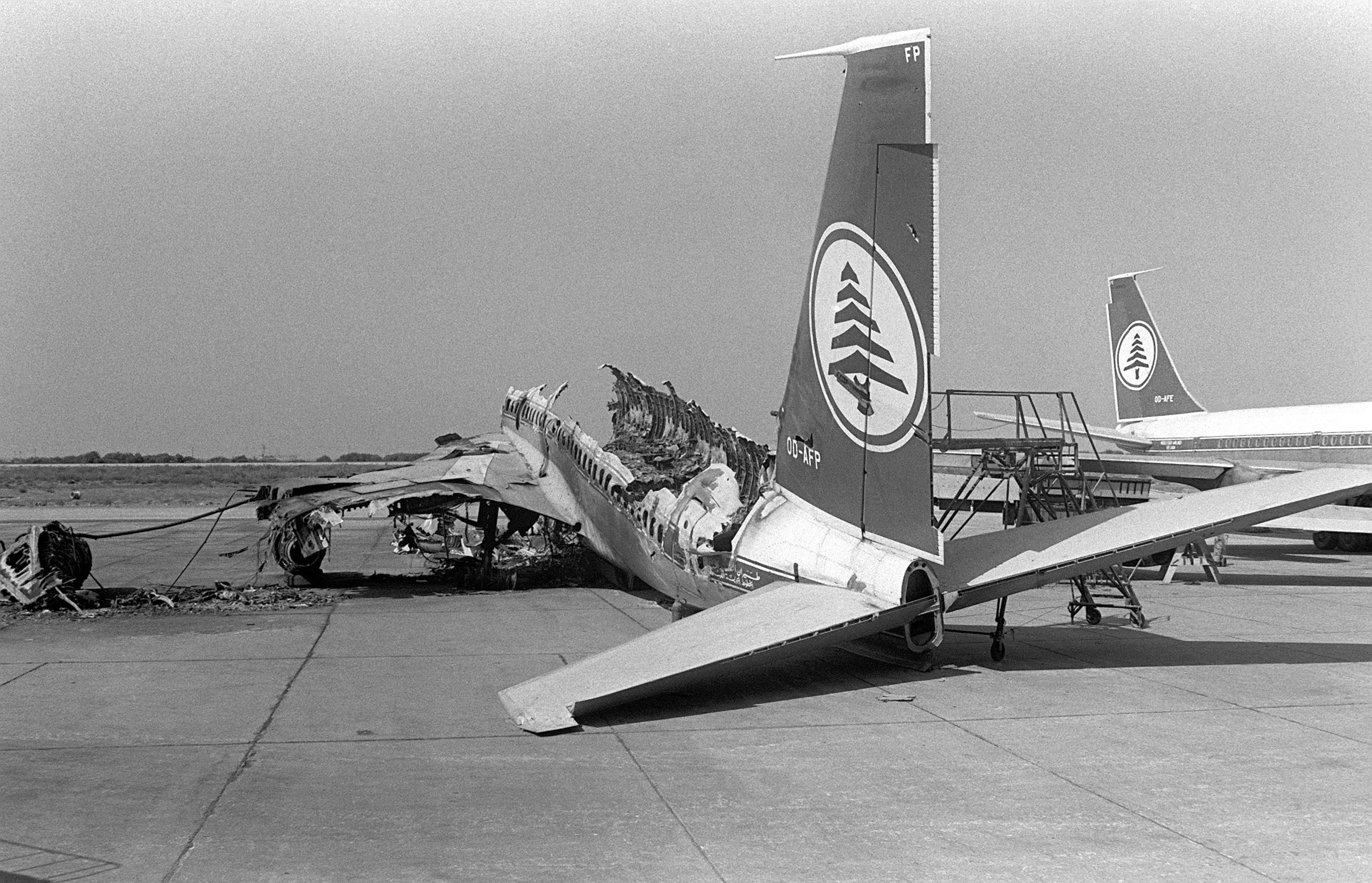
A destroyed Boeing 720 at Beirut Airport, 1982

To the west, as IDF troops mopped up remaining resistance in Tyre and Sidon, the Israeli advance on Beirut continued, and Syrian tank and commando units were then deployed south of Beirut to reinforce the PLO. When the Israelis reached the Beirut suburb of Kafr Sill, they met a joint Syrian-PLO force for the first time, and fought a difficult battle to take it. The IDF temporarily halted its advance in the western sector at Kafr Sill.

On 11 June, Israel and Syria announced that they had agreed to a cease-fire at noon, which would not include the PLO. The cease-fire was to come into effect at noon. Just before the cease-fire was to take effect, the Syrians moved a column of T-72 tanks so as to position it against Israeli forces in the valley. Israeli infantry teams armed with BGM-71 TOW anti-tank missiles ambushed the Syrian column, destroying 11 tanks. Another air battle also occurred, with the Israelis shooting down 18 more Syrian jets.

The Israeli advance on Beirut pressed forward in the west, reaching Khalde on 11 June. Six miles south of Beirut, the town was the last PLO position in front of Beirut Airport. The PLO fighters, led by Abdullah Siyam, fought a rearguard action which held up the Israeli advance for six days. Siyam was killed in the fighting. The Israelis, who stood on the outskirts of Beirut, advanced towards the airport, and engaged in frequent combat with PLO and Syrian units as Israeli warplanes continued to bomb PLO positions in Beirut.

The PLO's situation gradually grew worse as the Israeli advance gained ground, threatening to trap the PLO and a Syrian brigade deployed with them in the city. With the Israelis advancing on the south and the eastern sector of Beirut held by Lebanese Christian forces, the only way out was on the Beirut-Damascus highway, and the Israelis were building up forces at Ain Dara in the eastern sector, which were in a position to strike at the highway and block any PLO attempt to escape.

On 12 June, the Israeli-Syrian cease-fire was extended to the PLO. As the Israeli advance halted, the Israelis turned their attention to the zone they already occupied in southern Lebanon, and began a policy to root out any PLO remnants. Israeli troops began searches for arms caches, and suspected PLO members were systematically rounded up and screened, and taken to a detention camp on the Amoun Heights.

On 13 June, less than twelve hours after the Israeli-PLO ceasefire had gone into effect, it fell apart, and heavy fighting erupted around Khalde. As the fighting raged, an IDF armored unit struck northeast, attempting to bypass Khalde and advance on Baabda, which overlooked the airport and could be used as another staging point to cut the Beirut-Damascus highway. By 14 June, Syrian forces were being deployed to Khalde. Syrian units in Beirut and three commando battalions armed with anti-tank weaponry took up defensive positions southwest of the airport to block any Israeli attempt to capture it.

The Israelis attempted to flank these defenses by moving off the road past Shuweifat, up a narrow, steep, and winding road towards Baabda, but were ambushed by a Syrian commando battalion. The Syrians attacked Israeli armor with rocket-propelled grenades and anti-tank missiles at close range. Israeli infantry dismounted and engaged the Syrians. Fierce fighting took place, with the Israelis calling in artillery at very close range to themselves. The Israelis advanced relentlessly, and after fourteen hours of fierce combat that raged up through Ain Aanoub and Souq el-Gharb, they broke through the Syrian positions and entered Baabda.

The IDF then immediately sent reinforcements to the column in Baabda to enable it to carry out further operations. From Baabda, the Israeli force split into three columns, one of which struck across the highway and entered the mountainous area to the northeast, one swung west and took up positions in the steep hills west of Beirut, and one turned toward Kahale, which was further down the highway. To the south, the IDF drove PLO forces out of Shuweifat, but no major battles occurred. The Israelis had now cut the Beirut-Damascus highway, cutting off all PLO and Syrian forces in the city.

On 15 June, Israel offered free passage to all Syrian forces in Beirut if they would withdraw from the city to the Bekaa Valley in the east, but the Syrian government refused and sent further reinforcements to its units along the highway and north of the highway near Beirut. The Israelis faced Syrian strongpoints reinforced by armor and artillery all along the highway. However, between 16 June and 22 June, the fighting was limited to artillery duels and minor firefights between Israeli and Syrian forces, as both sides reinforced their troops.

=== Battles of the Beirut–Damascus highway ===
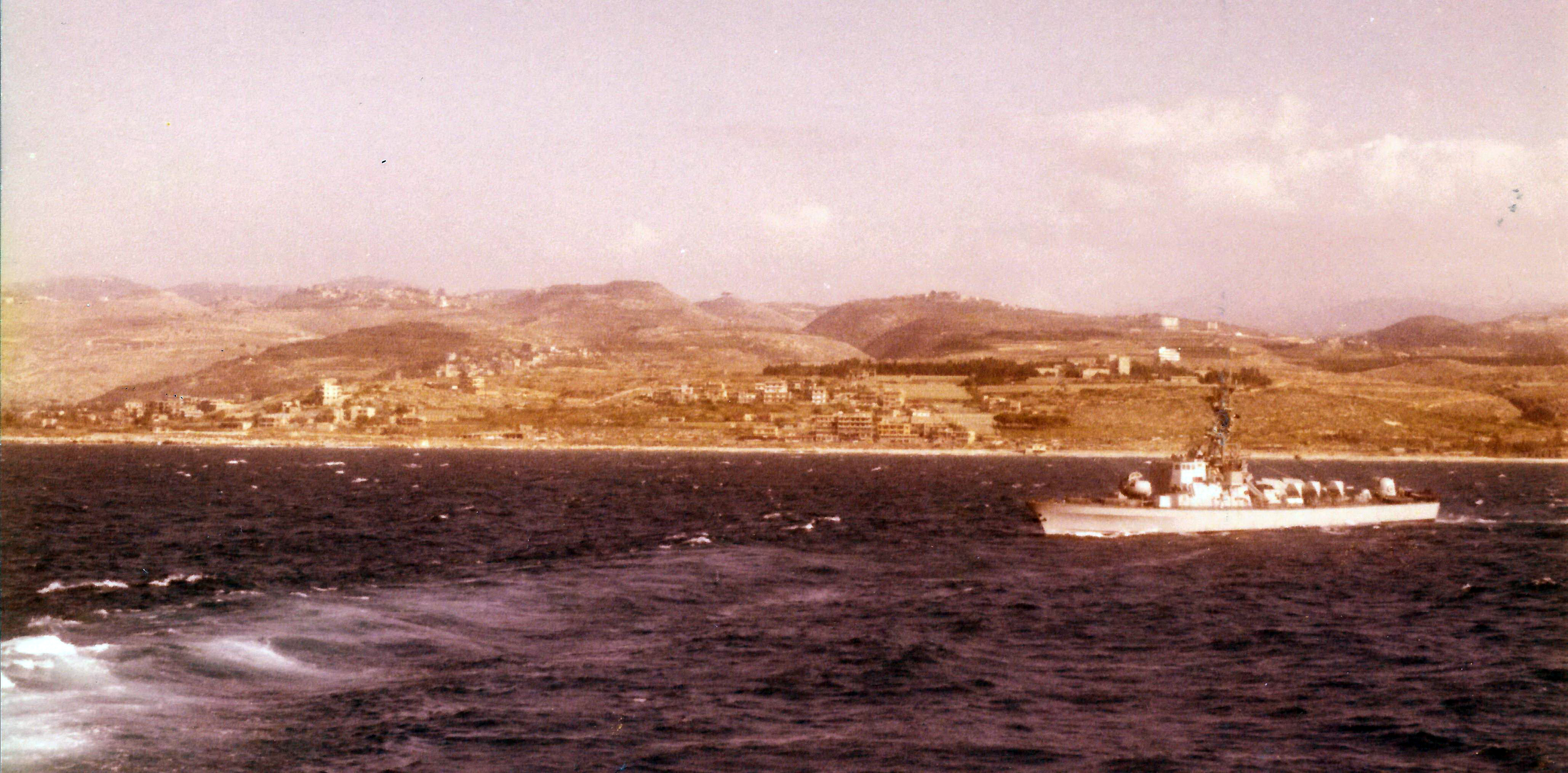
The Israeli Navy missile boat INS Romach off the coast of Lebanon, August 1982

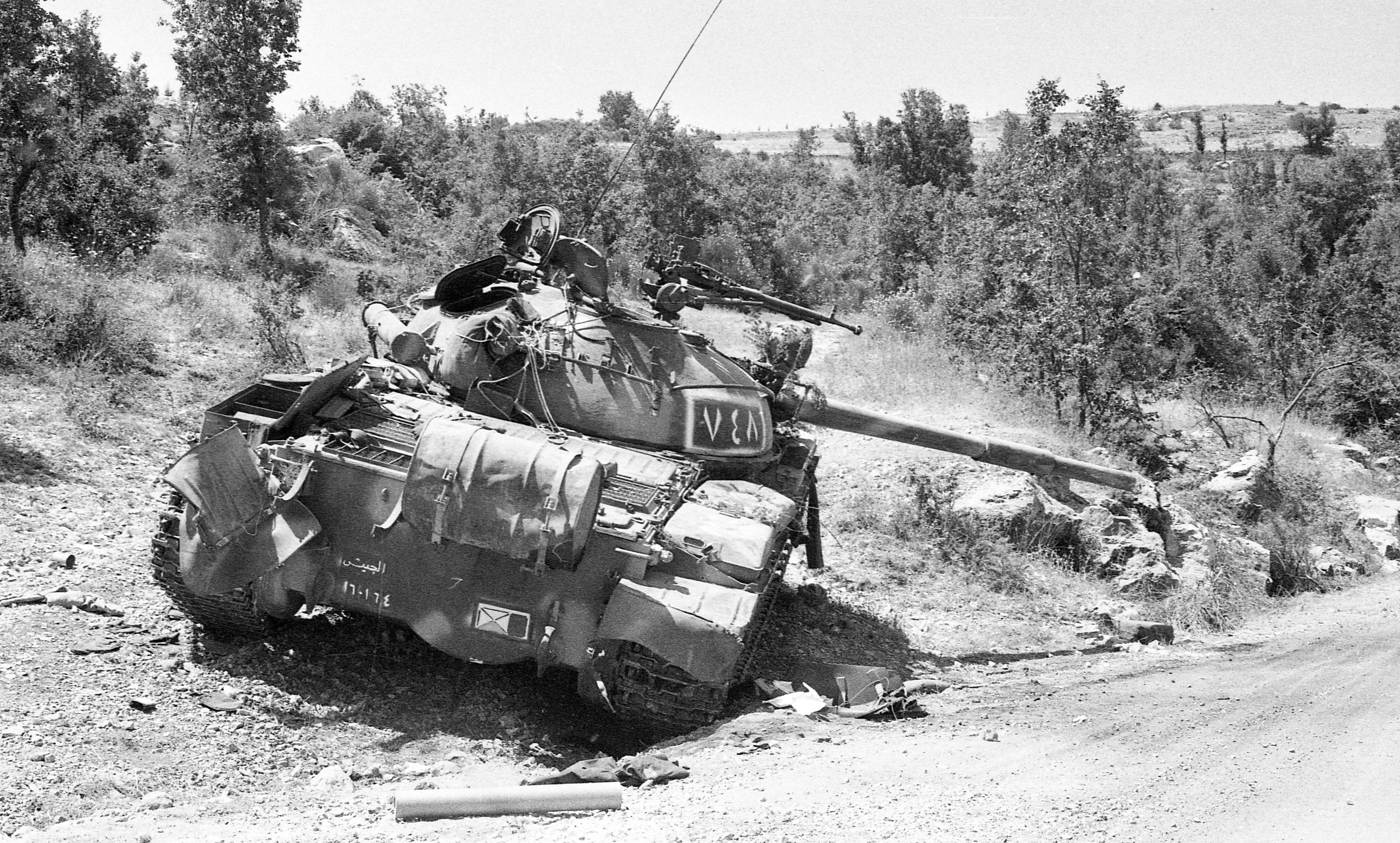
A Syrian T-62 destroyed somewhere in Lebanon by the IDF, 1982

As the two sides prepared for combat, the IDF deemed capturing the Beirut–Damascus highway to be of critical importance. With the Syrians in control of most of the highway, occupying the towns along the highway and to the north, the Israelis could not prevent Syrian and PLO forces from escaping or launch further operations into Beirut without risking a Syrian flanking attack, and the Israelis also wanted a clear transit to Christian-held eastern Beirut.

On 22 June, the IDF launched an operation to capture the highway. The Israeli Air Force flew highly effective missions against Syrian positions and vehicles, with Israeli pilots reporting 130 enemy vehicles destroyed in a single air attack alone. Israeli long-range artillery targeted Syrian strongpoints to the north. Israeli armored forces with artillery support attacked Syrian positions along the highway, with the objective of driving them from the highway all the way back to the edge of the Bekaa Valley.

With air and artillery support mostly limited to targets north of the highway, the fighting was fierce, especially to the south. By the end of the day, Israel accepted an American request for a cease-fire and halted its offensive, but the cease-fire collapsed the following day and the fighting resumed. As the Israelis pushed forward, and managed to trap a large Syrian force, Syrian defenses began to collapse. For the first time in the war, Syrian troops began to break and run. At Aley, which was defended by Iranian volunteers sent to fight for the PLO, the Israelis encountered fierce resistance.

The Israelis managed to push to the eastern Bekaa Valley, and on 24 June, began to shell the outskirts of Chtaura, which was at the northern mouth of the Bekaa Valley and served as headquarters of all Syrian forces there. It was also the last major obstacle before the Syrian border, as well as Syria's capital Damascus itself. The Israelis managed to reach the mountain pass near the village of Dahr el-Baidar, which was the last obstacle before Cthaura. The Syrians fought fiercely to hold the pass, and the Israeli advance halted, with the Israelis holding their ground and harassing the Syrians with artillery fire.

By 25 June, with the remaining Syrian positions on and north of the highway no longer tenable, the Syrians withdrew. The Israelis allowed the withdrawal to occur but conducted artillery harassment and continued to shell the outskirts of Chtaura. The Syrians attempted to deploy a SAM battery in the Bekaa Valley at midnight, but Israeli intelligence detected this, and the battery was destroyed in an Israeli air attack. By the end of the day, a cease-fire was announced. The Israelis stopped at their present positions.

=== Siege of Beirut ===
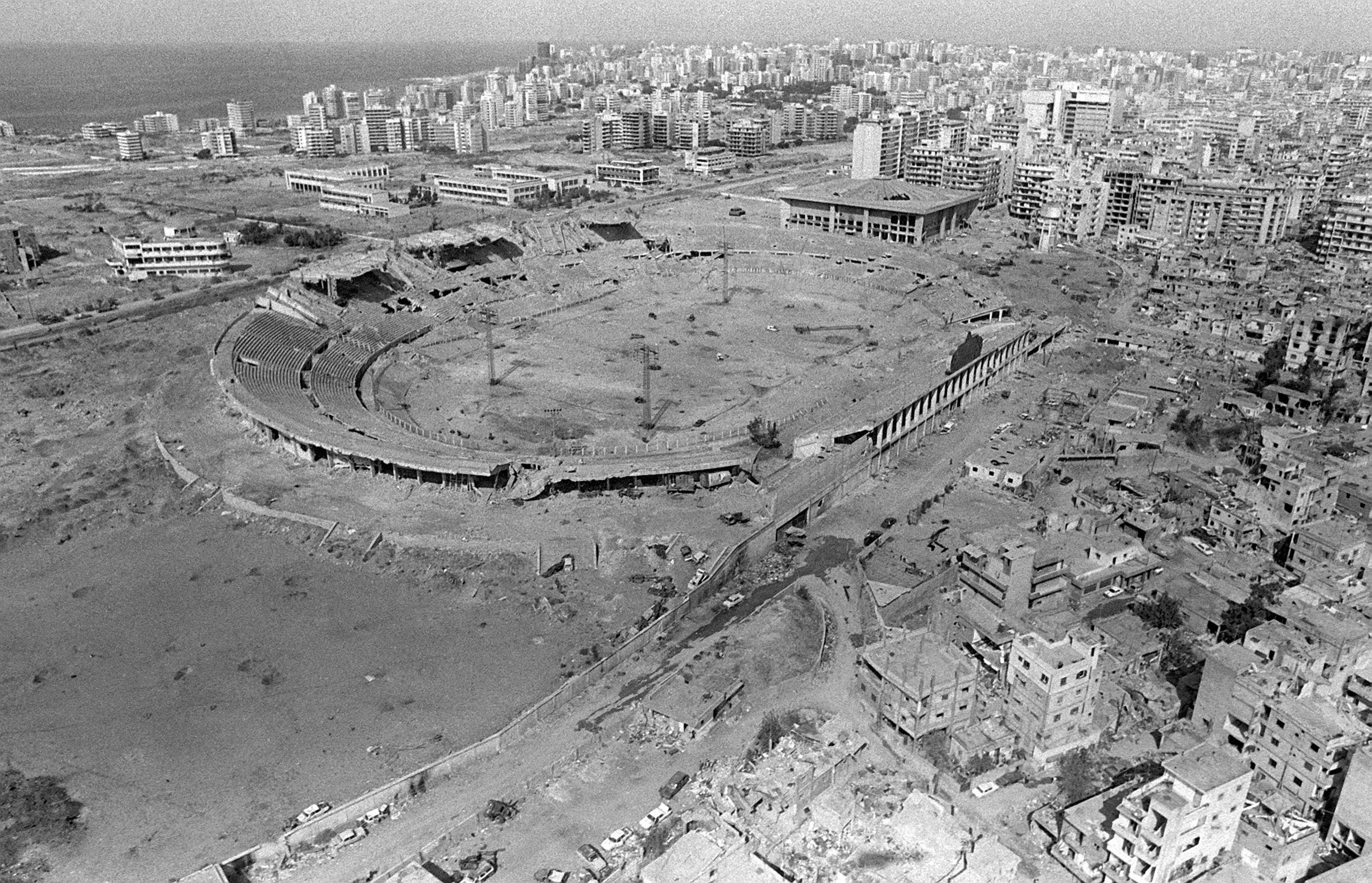
The stadium used as an ammunition supply site for the PLO, after Israeli airstrikes in 1982

The Siege of Beirut had begun on 14 June 1982: Israeli forces had completed the encirclement of the city the previous day. The Israelis chose to keep the city under siege rather than forcibly capture it, as they were unwilling to accept the heavy casualties that the heavy street fighting required to capture the city would have resulted in. Israeli forces bombarded targets within Beirut from land, sea, and air, and attempted to assassinate Palestinian leaders through airstrikes. The Israeli Navy maintained a blockade on the port of Beirut with a ring of missile boats and patrol boats supported by submarines.

The siege lasted until August, when an agreement was reached in August 1982. More than 14,000 PLO combatants evacuated the country in August and September, supervised by the Multinational Force in Lebanon, an international peacekeeping force with troops from the United States, United Kingdom, France, and Italy. About 6,500 Fatah fighters relocated from Beirut to Jordan, Syria, Iraq, Sudan, both North and South Yemen, Greece, and Tunisia—the latter of which became the new PLO headquarters.

Israel withdrew its forces from west Beirut on 29 September, officially ending Operation Peace for Galilee. Philip Habib, Ronald Reagan's envoy to Lebanon, provided an understanding (i.e., assurance) to the PLO that the Palestinian civilians in the refugee camps would not be harmed. However, increased hostilities against the US resulted in the April 1983 United States Embassy bombing. In response, the US brokered the May 17 Agreement, in an attempt to stall hostilities between Israel and Lebanon. However, this agreement eventually failed to take shape, and hostilities continued. These attacks were attributed to Iranian-backed Islamist guerrillas. Following this incident, international peacekeeping forces were withdrawn from Lebanon.

== Further conflict and Israeli withdrawal ==
Following the departure of the PLO and international peacekeepers, Islamist militants began launching guerrilla attacks against Israeli forces. Suicide bombings were a particularly popular tactic, the most serious being the Tyre headquarters bombings, which twice devastated IDF headquarters in Tyre, and killed 103 Israeli soldiers, border policemen, and Shin Bet agents, as well as 49–56 Lebanese. The IDF subsequently withdrew from the Shouf Mountains but continued occupying Lebanon south of the Awali River.

An increased number of Islamic militias began operating in South Lebanon, launching guerrilla attacks on Israeli positions and on pro-Israeli Lebanese militias. Israeli forces often responded with increased security measures and airstrikes on militant positions, and casualties on all sides steadily climbed. In a vacuum left with eradication of PLO, the disorganized Islamic militants in South Lebanon began to consolidate. The emerging Hezbollah, soon to become the preeminent Islamic militia, evolved during this period. However, scholars disagree as to when Hezbollah came to be regarded as a distinct entity. Over time, a number of Shi'a group members were slowly assimilated into the organization, such as Islamic Jihad members, Organization of the Oppressed on Earth, and the Revolutionary Justice Organization.

In February 1985, Israel withdrew from Sidon and turned it over to the Lebanese Army, but faced attacks: 15 Israelis were killed and 105 wounded during the withdrawal. Dozens of pro-Israeli Lebanese militiamen were also assassinated. From mid-February to mid-March, the Israelis lost 18 dead and 35 wounded. On 11 March, Israeli forces raided the town of Zrariyah, killing 40 Amal fighters and capturing a large stock of arms. On 9 April, a Shiite girl drove a car bomb into an IDF convoy, and the following day, a soldier was killed by a land mine. During that same period, Israeli forces killed 80 Lebanese guerrillas in five weeks. Another 1,800 Shi'as were taken as prisoners.

Israel withdrew from the Bekaa valley on 24 April, and from Tyre on the 29th. In June 1985, the IDF unilaterally withdrew to a security zone in southern Lebanon along with its principal Lebanese ally, the South Lebanon Army, completing its troop withdrawal to the security zone on 5 June.

Despite this being considered the end of the war, conflict would continue. Hezbollah continued to fight the IDF and SLA in the South Lebanon conflict until Israel's final withdrawal from Lebanon in 2000.

== Military analysis ==
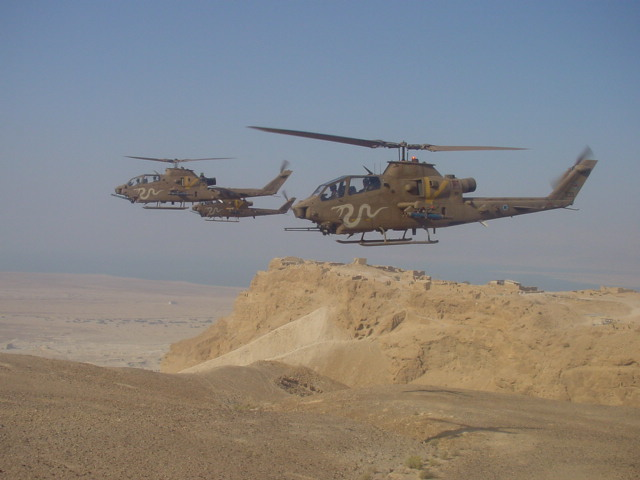
IAF Cobra gunships on military exercise. These attack helicopters were successfully employed against Syrian AFVs during the conflict.

During the course of combat operations, the Israeli Air Force conducted successful ground attack missions against Syrian and PLO targets, with Israeli attack helicopters inflicting heavy losses on Syrian armor. Israeli jets shot down between 82 and 86 Syrian aircraft in aerial combat, without losses. A single Israeli A-4 Skyhawk and two helicopters were shot down by anti-aircraft fire and SAM missiles. This was the largest aerial combat battle of the jet age with over 150 fighters from both sides engaged. Syrian claims of aerial victories were met with skepticism even from their Soviet allies.

The Soviets were so shaken by the staggering losses sustained by their allies that they dispatched the deputy head of their air defense force to Syria to examine how the Israelis had been so dominant. The Israeli Air Force also performed ground attacks, notably destroying the majority of Syrian anti-aircraft batteries stationed in Lebanon. AH-1 Cobra helicopter gunships were employed against Syrian armour and fortifications. IAF Cobras destroyed dozens of Syrian Armored fighting vehicles, including some of the modern Soviet T-72 main battle tanks.

The war also witnessed the Israeli Merkava MBT make its first combat debut, facing Syrian T-72 tanks. During these engagements, the Israelis claimed that the Merkava proved superior to the T-72, destroying a number of them without sustaining a single loss to T-72 fire.

Former IAF commander, David Ivri would later recall a meeting with a high-ranking member of the Warsaw Pact, in which he was told that the dominance of Israeli and U.S. technology and tactics during the war was one of the factors that changed Soviet mind-set, leading to Glasnost and ultimately, the fall of the Soviet Union. However, defense analysts and the Syrians claimed the opposite, saying that their T-72s were highly effective and that none were lost.

The T-72 tanks of the Syrian 2nd Armored Division were credited with not only halting the advance of an Israeli armored brigade on Rashaya on 10 June but pushing them back. They tallied the destruction of 33 tanks and the capture of an M60 Patton, which was sent to Damascus and thence transported to Moscow. Syrian tanks saw similar success against Israeli armor in Ain Zhalta and Sultan Yacoub in fighting on 8–10 June, stemming their advance to capture the Beirut-Damascus highway.

== Final accords ==
On 14 September 1982, Bachir Gemayel, the newly elected President of Lebanon, was assassinated by Habib Shartouni of the Syrian Social Nationalist Party. Israeli forces occupied West Beirut the next day. At that time, the Lebanese Christian Militia, also known as the Phalangists, were allied with Israel. The Israeli command authorized the entrance of a force of approximately 150 Phalangist fighters' into Sabra and the Shatila refugee camp. Shatila had previously been one of the PLO's three main training camps for foreign militants and the main training camp for European militants; the Israelis maintained that 2,000 to 3,000 terrorists remained in the camps, but were unwilling to risk the lives of more of their soldiers after the Lebanese army repeatedly refused to "clear them out."

Between 460 and 3,500 civilians, mostly Palestinians and Lebanese Shiites were massacred by the Phalangists, who themselves suffered only two casualties. The Lebanese army's chief prosecutor investigated the killings and counted 460 dead, Israeli intelligence estimated 700–800 dead, and the Palestinian Red Crescent claimed 2,000 dead. 1,200 death certificates were issued to anyone who produced three witnesses claiming a family member disappeared during the time of the massacre. Nearly all of the victims were men.

Israeli troops surrounded the camps with tanks and checkpoints, monitoring entrances and exits. Israeli investigation by the Kahan Commission of Inquiry found that Ariel Sharon bore "personal responsibility" for failing to prevent the massacre, and for failing to act once he learned of the massacre. The Commission recommended that he be removed as Defense Minister and that he never hold a position in any future Israeli government. Sharon initially ignored the call to resign, but after the death of an anti-war protester, resigned as Israel's Defense Minister, remaining in Begin's cabinet as a Minister without portfolio.

== Opposing forces ==
The 1982 Lebanon War was at first a conventional war up to and including when the PLO were expelled from Beirut. The war was limited by both Israel and Syria because they were determined to isolate the fighting, not allowing it to turn into an all-out war. Israeli forces were numerically superior, allowing Israel to maintain both the initiative and an element of surprise. The Syrian Army fielded six divisions and 500 aircraft, while Israel used five divisions and two brigades, plus 600 aircraft. There were numerous other factions involved.

=== Israel and allies ===
==== Israel ====
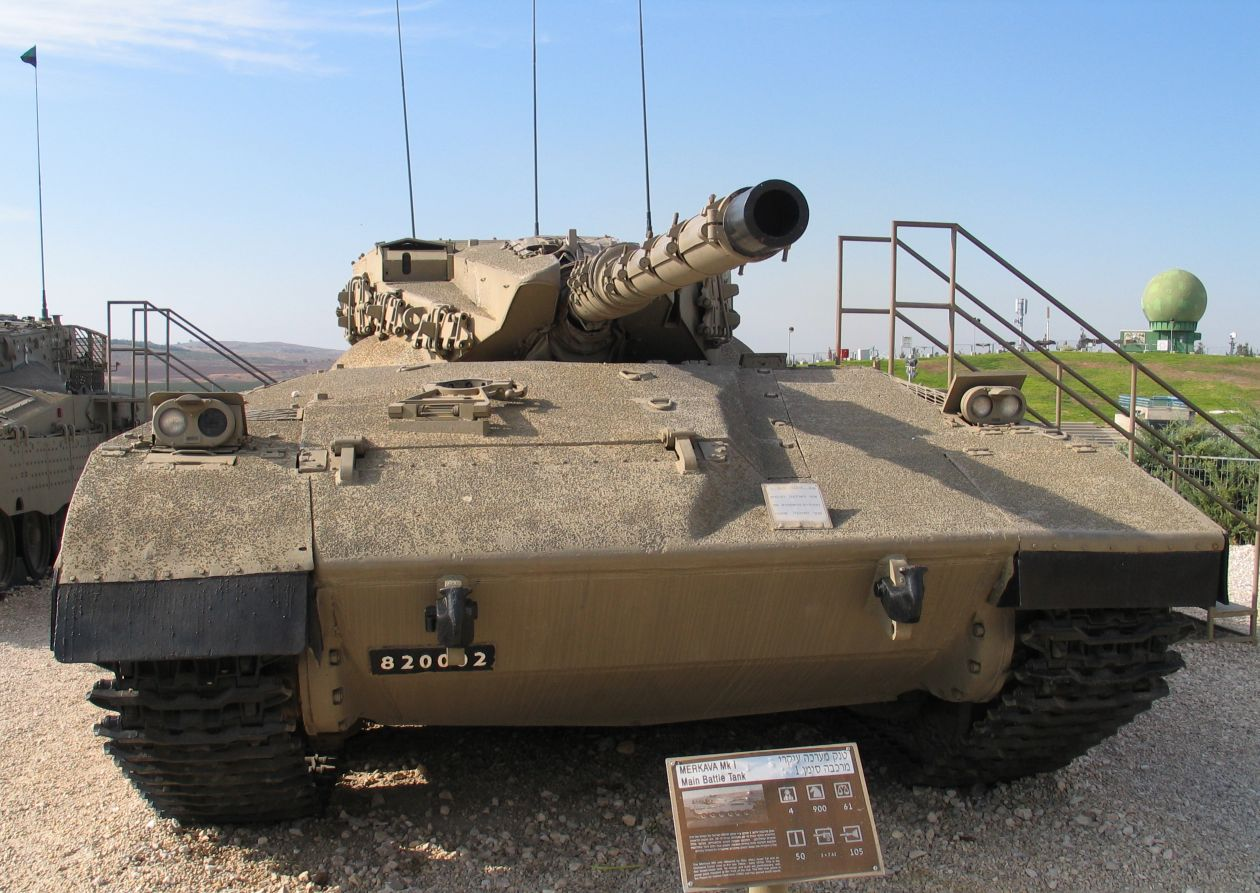
The Israeli Merkava Mark I tank was used throughout the First Lebanon War

IDF forces totalled 78,000 men, 1,240 tanks and 1,500 armoured personnel carriers. IDF troops were deployed in five divisions and two reinforced brigade-size units. The IDF maintained additional forces on the Golan Heights as an area reserve. IDF forces were divided into three main axis of advances called sectors:

- Coastal Sector, (from Rosh Hanikra north to Tyre, Sidon, Damour and Beirut.) – Forces included Division 91 with three brigades including the 211th and the Golani Brigade. The 35 Paratroop Brigade and the Na'hal 50th Paratroop Battalion were attached to the division as needed. The Israeli Navy provided naval interdiction, shore gunfire support and landed a mixed brigade from Division 96 at the mouth of the Awali River near Sidon. Israeli Naval commandos had landed there previously.
- Central Sector (from Beaufort Castle to Nabatiyeh) – Jezzine was the main objective and then on to Sidon to link up with the coastal forces. IDF forces included the Divisions 36 and 162.
- Eastern Sector (from Rachaiya and Hasbaiya through the Bekaa Valley around Lake Qaraoun) – IDF forces included Divisions 90 and 252, the Vardi Force and the Special Maneuver Force which was composed of two brigades of Infantry and paratroops who were trained for anti-tank operations. These forces were primarily used to contain the Syrians with orders not to initiate combat against them.

==== Lebanese Front ====
- Lebanese Front – a coalition of mainly Christian parties formed in 1976. Combined Lebanese Front forces totalled about 30,000 fighting men and women, around 17,000 of which were regulars. The Lebanese Forces were officially aligned with Israel in the war, but took a small role in the fighting. These troops were mostly from the Kataeb party but also included men from smaller right-wing militias, including Saad Haddad's Army of Free Lebanon, al-Tanzim and Guardians of the Cedars.
- South Lebanon Army – founded in 1979, the SLA acted as Israel's proxy in Southern Lebanon and fought the PLO and Hezbollah. The SLA was composed of 50% Christians, 30% Shiites and 20% Druze and Sunni personnel

=== Syria, PLO and allies ===
==== Syrian Armed Forces ====
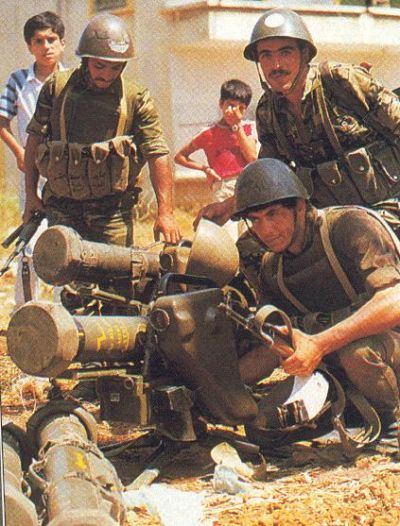
Syrian anti-tank teams deployed French-made Milan ATGMs during the war in Lebanon, 1982

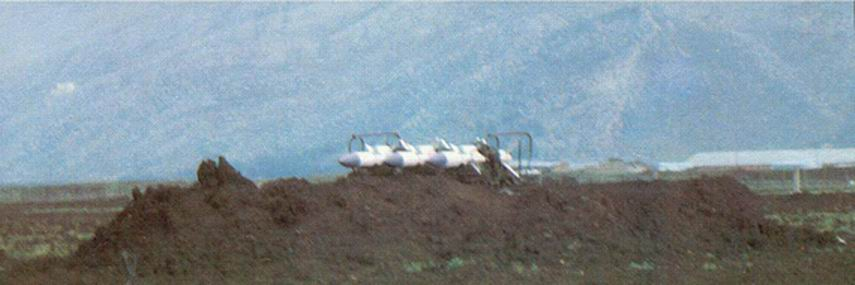
Part of a Syrian SA-6 site built near the Beirut-Damascus highway, and overlooking the Bekaa Valley, in early 1982

The Syrian Army had over 30,000 troops deployed in Lebanon in June 1982. The largest concentration was in the Bekaa Valley where the 1st Armoured Division consisting of the 58th Mechanised and the 76th and 91st Armoured Brigades. The 62nd Independent Armored Brigade and ten commando battalions were also assigned to the division. Syria deployed around 400 tanks in the Bekaa Valley. 19 surface-to-air missile batteries, including SA6's, were also deployed in the Bekaa Valley.

In Beirut and the Shouf Mountains were the 85th Infantry Brigade, the PLA, As-Sa'iqa and 20 commando battalions. Syria deployed around 200 tanks in this area. Their primary mission was to protect the Beirut-Damascus Highway, which was Syria's primary supply line in the region.

==== Palestinians ====
===== PLO =====
Palestinian Liberation Organization forces continued to grow in Lebanon, with full-time military personnel numbering around 15,000 fedayeen, although only 6,000 of these – including 4,500 regulars – deployed in the south. They were armed with 80 aging tanks, many of them no longer mobile, and with 100 to 200 pieces of artillery. According to Israeli analysts Schiff and Ya'ari (1984), the PLO more than quadrupled its artillery from 80 cannons and rocket launchers in July 1981 to 250 in June 1982. The same authors also refer to Israeli intelligence estimates of the number of PLO fighters in southern Lebanon of 6,000 as

divided into three concentrations; about 1,500 south of the Litani River in the so-called Iron Triangle (between the villages of Kana, Dir Amas, and Juya), Tyre, and its surrounding refugee camps; another 2,500 of the Kastel Brigade in three districts between the Litani and a line running from Sidon to northeast of Nabatiye; and a third large concentration of about 1,500–2,000 men of the Karameh Brigade in the east, on the slopes of Mount Hermon.

PLO primary forces consisted of three conventional brigades – each of 2,000 to 2,500 men – and of seven artillery battalions. Each brigade comprised contingents of the many PLO factions. The Yarmouk Brigade was stationed along the coastal strip while the Kastel Brigade was in the south. The Karameh Brigade was stationed on the eastern slopes of Mount Hermon in the area called Fatahland.

The PLO had around 15,000 to 18,000 fighters deployed as follows:

- 6,000 in the Beirut, Ba'abda and Damour area
- 1,500 in Sidon
- 1,000 between Sidon and Tyre
- 1,500 in Tyre
- 1,000 deployed from Nabatiyeh to Beaufort Castle
- 2,000 in Fatahland
- around 1,000 in the UNIFIL Zone

Heavy weapons consisted of about 60 T-34, T-54 and T-55 tanks (most of them dug in as pillboxes), up to 250 130mm and 155 mm artillery, many BM21 Katyusha multiple-rocket launchers plus heavy mortars.

===== Non-PLO Palestinian groups =====
Palestinian groups of the radical Rejectionist Front joined forces with the mainstream PLO.

These groups included:

- Arab Liberation Front (ALF), a Palestinian group affiliated with Iraqi-led Ba'ath Party with an estimated 2,500 fighters in total
- As-Sa'iqa ("Thunderbolt"), a Palestinian group affiliated with Syrian-led Ba'ath Party with an estimated 4,000 fighters in total
- Democratic Front for the Liberation of Palestine (DFLP) with an estimated 2,500 fighters in total
- Fatah-Revolutionary Council
- Popular Front for the Liberation of Palestine (PFLP) with an estimated 2,000 fighters in total
- Popular Front for the Liberation of Palestine - General Command (PFLP-GC) with an estimated 2,000 fighters in total
- Palestine Liberation Army (PLA) with an estimated 5,000 fighters in total
- Palestinian Popular Struggle Front (PPSF) with an estimated 2,200 fighters in total

==== Left wing ====
Statue of Augustus in Rome with graffiti "PALESTINA ROSSA" (Red Palestine) in response to the Lebanon War, October 1982

Left wing parties joined forces with the PLO in what came to be known as the "joint forces".

- Al-Mourabitoun – a secular Nasserist party, with a militia numbering around 3,500 fighters who were known for wearing red painted Soviet helmets with "al-Mourabitoun" painted on front in Arabic script. They fought alongside the PLO and the joint forces in the Beirut area until the cease fire after which they acquired much cast-off PLO equipment such as tanks and rocket launchers. They were supported largely by Libya and Syria.
- Lebanese Communist Party – Lebanon's main Communist party headed by George Hawi, members of the party enlisted in the "joint forces" during the initial invasion.
- Communist Action Organization in Lebanon – a Communist party headed by Mohsen Ibrahim mainly active in Southern Lebanon, the organization conducted guerilla operations against Israeli garrisons following the invasion.
- The Kurdistan Workers' Party at the time had training camps in Lebanon, where they received support from the Syrians and the PLO. During the Israeli invasion all PKK units were ordered to fight the Israeli forces. A total of 11 PKK fighters died in the conflict.
- Arab Socialist Action Party – a Communist party headed by Hussein Hamdan mainly active in Southern Lebanon, the organization conducted guerilla operations against Israeli garrisons following the invasion.
- The Lebanese National Resistance Front – an alliance formed in September 16, 1982 by George Hawi of the LCP, Mohsen Ibrahim of the OCAL and Hussein Hamdan of the ASAP against the Israeli occupation, its forces totalled about 30,000 fighting men and women and was the successor of the Lebanese National Movement.

==== Muslim militias ====
Muslim forces were mostly Shiite organizations which joined forces with the more significant PLO during the initial invasion, but operated independently towards the end of 1982:

- Amal Movement – Shia movement. Amal's fragmented nature was corroborated by the difference decisions in the Southern Lebanon and Beirut. The alienation by Palestinian and Leftist factions caused Amal fighters in the south to assume a neutral position and watch as Israeli tanks rolled by. This was contrasted at Ouzai, Ghobeiry and Chyah, where Amal fighters mounted some of the most spirited and aggressive defensive actions against the invading forces. During the initial invasion, the PLO and Amal were effectively the only major forces resisting the Israeli thrust northwards, temporarily halting them at Khaldeh for 6 days. A no man's land was marked at the Beirut Airport, where hundreds of Palestinian and Lebanese Shia militants were killed defending the airport.
- Islamic Students Union – an Islamic group which later formed the core of Hezbollah, its members took part in battles of Khalde, the airport and the Museum front in June–September 1982. Mustafa Badreddine was part of the group.
- Pasdaran – In July 1982 Iran dispatched an expeditionary force of Revolutionary Guards to Lebanon, ostensibly to fight the Israeli invaders. The approximately 1,500 Pasdaran established their headquarters in the Syrian-controlled Beqaa Valley where they conducted guerrilla training and disbursed military material and money for the newly-formed Islamist groups including Hezbollah.
- Islamic Amal – Hussein al-Musawi, a former Amal lieutenant, split from Amal and set up his own faction. Musawi entered into an alliance with the Revolutionary Guard and received training and money from them, as Islamic Amal quickly grew to around 1,000 fighters.
- Hezbollah – a Shia resistance faction which formed following the initial invasion in 1982, and set on fighting Israeli presence and western influence in Lebanon. The group substantially swelled by 1984 and claimed responsibility for most of the operations conducted against Israeli and SLA forces between 1984 and 2000.
- Other Shia groups included the Imam Hussein Fedayeen, Islamic Dawa Party in Lebanon, and the notorious Islamic Jihad Organization reportedly headed by Imad Mughniyyah, which likely served as an early alias of Hezbollah.

=== UNIFIL ===
On 19 March 1978, the United Nations Interim Force in Lebanon, or UNIFIL, was created by the United Nations, with the adoption of the United Nations Security Council Resolution 425 and the United Nations Security Council Resolution 426, to confirm Israeli withdrawal from Lebanon which Israel had invaded five days prior, restore international peace and security, and help the Government of Lebanon restore its effective authority in the area. The first UNIFIL troops were deployed in the area on 23 March 1978. These troops were reassigned from other UN peacekeeping operations in the area, namely the United Nations Emergency Force and the United Nations Disengagement Observer Force Zone. During the 1982 Lebanon War, UN positions were overrun, primarily by the South Lebanon Army forces under Saad Haddad.

== Outcome of the war ==
=== Casualties ===
==== Lebanese, Palestinian, and Syrian casualties ====
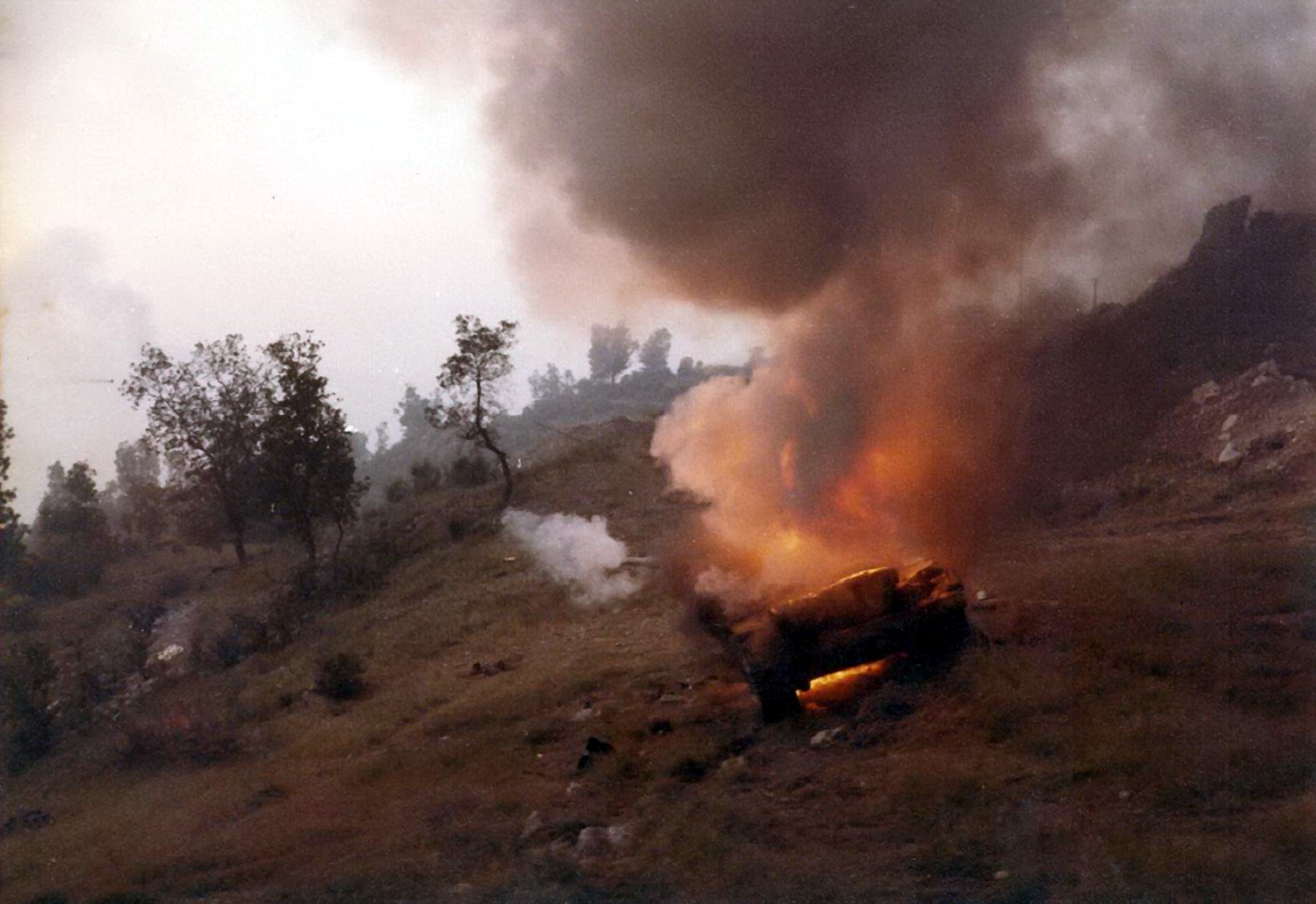
A Syrian tank burning on the road outside Jezzine

Estimates of numbers of the casualties in the conflict vary widely.

By the end of the first week, 14 June 1982, International Red Cross and Lebanese police figures said that 9,583 had died and 16,608 injured. By the end of the second week, they said up to 14,000 people died and 20,000 were injured, mostly civilians.

During the Siege of Beirut, by late August 1982, Lebanese sources put the death toll in Beirut at 6,776. This figure included victims of the 4 June 1982, bombing, which occurred two days before the operation officially started. Lebanese police and international doctors serving in Beirut put the number of civilian casualties at about 80%. According to American military analyst Richard Gabriel, all factions in the conflicts agree that between 4,000 and 5,000 civilians died during the siege caused by military activity of all sides. He states that most of the observers that were present on the ground and other relevant sources in Lebanon agree that estimates of 8,000–10,000 are too high.

Accurate numbers of total casualties are hard to estimate, due to "[t]he chaos of warfare, the destruction of city neighborhoods and refugee camps, the haste with which bodies were buried in mass graves and the absence of impartial agencies". Many officials in Beirut, including those of the International Red Cross, claimed that the number of deaths were extremely difficult to estimate correctly. At least one official from a relief organization claimed that in the South about 80% of deaths were civilian and only 20% military.

In early September 1982, the independent Beirut newspaper An Nahar published an estimate of deaths from hospital and police records covering the period from 6 June to 31 August 1982. It claimed that 17,285 people were killed: 5,515 people, both military and civilian, in the Beirut area; and 2,513 civilians, as well as 9,797 military forces, including PLO and Syrians, outside of the Beirut area.

The Lebanese authorities gave a figure of 19,085 killed and 30,000 wounded; in Beirut alone 6,775 died, 84% of them civilians. In southern Lebanon, around 20% of those dead were civilians. They do not include the estimated 800–3,500 killed in the Sabra and Shatila massacre.

Richard Gabriel estimated that roughly 2,400 PLO fighters were killed during the war, of whom about 1,400 were killed throughout southern Lebanon and another 1,000 killed during the Siege of Beirut. Gabriel also estimated that between 5,000 and 8,000 civilians died during the war. Some later estimates have put the total figure at 18–19,000 killed and more than 30,000 wounded, most of them civilians. 80% of villages in South Lebanon were damaged, with some completely destroyed. The Israeli government maintained that about 1,000 Palestinian fighters and 800 Lebanese civilians died during the invasion, excluding the siege of Beirut. Anthony Tucker-Jones estimated that about 1,500 PLO fighters were killed. Kenneth Pollack estimated that 1,200 Syrian soldiers were killed and about 3,000 wounded during the war.

==== Israeli casualties ====
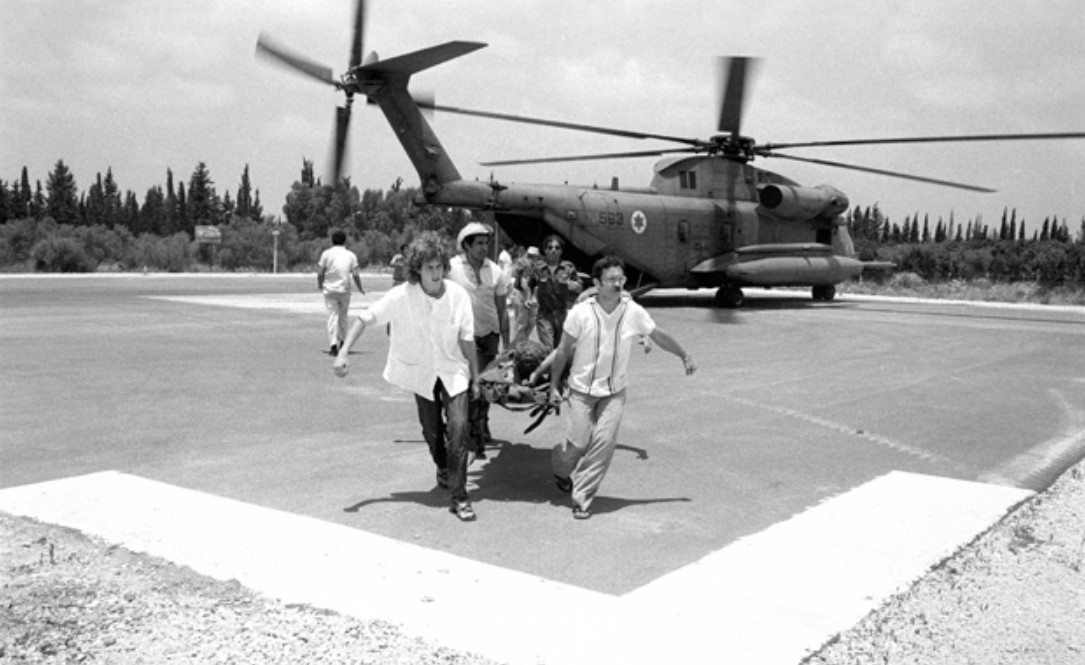
A wounded Israeli soldier arrives at Rambam Medical Center in Haifa after being evacuated by helicopter

According to Israeli figures, Israeli losses in Operation Peace for Galilee were 368 dead and 2,383 wounded, from 6 June until 10 October. The highest ranking IDF casualty of the war was Brigadier General Yekutiel Adam, who was Deputy Chief of Staff of the IDF and had been appointed to be the next Director-General of the Mossad. He was killed by a Palestinian fighter while seeking protection in a house in Dawha, near Damour, during a mortar attack. Other Israeli fatalities included one Colonel, two Lieutenant Colonels; 19 Majors, 28 Captains, 46 Lieutenants, 132 Sergeants, 90 Corporals, and 49 Privates. According to Kenneth Pollack, Israeli losses in action against the Syrians were 195 dead and 872 wounded. 130 Israeli tanks were destroyed or damaged by the Syrians, as were 175 APCs.

The IDF also listed six soldiers as Missing in action in the Battle of Sultan Yacoub. Two prisoners and the bodies of another two were later returned to Israel but two soldiers remain missing.

Palestinian factions captured 11 IDF soldiers during the war, including one of the soldiers missing from Sultan Yacoub, an Israeli Air Force pilot in the Beaufort battle, a soldier during the Siege of Beirut and eight soldiers in the raid on an IDF observation post in Bhamdoun. All eleven prisoners were subsequently released in prisoner exchanges.

The IDF's total casualties in Lebanon from the start of Operation Peace for Galilee in June 1982 to the withdrawal to the security zone in June 1985 amounted 654 killed and 3,887 wounded.

The IDF continued to occupy a substantial part of Lebanon even after the withdrawal to security zone in June 1985. Resistance continued and IDF losses continued to mount. By the time IDF withdrew from Lebanon in May 2000 the total number of IDF fatalities had reached 1,216 killed since June 1982.

Israeli civilian casualties from cross-border shelling numbered 9–10 killed and at least 248 wounded between June 1982 and 1999.

=== Security buffer zone and Syrian occupation ===
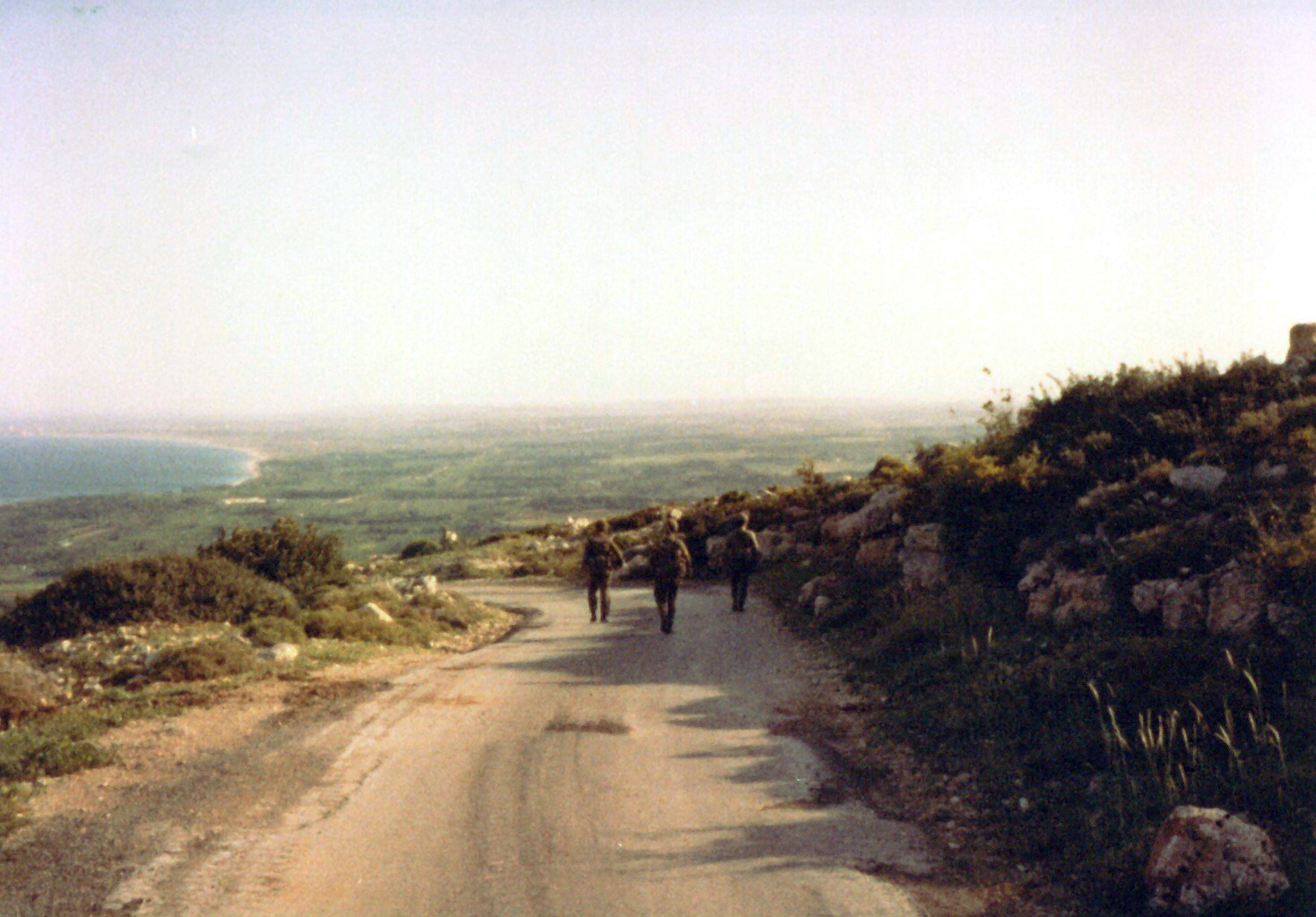
An IDF patrol near Ras Biada- south Lebanon, 1986

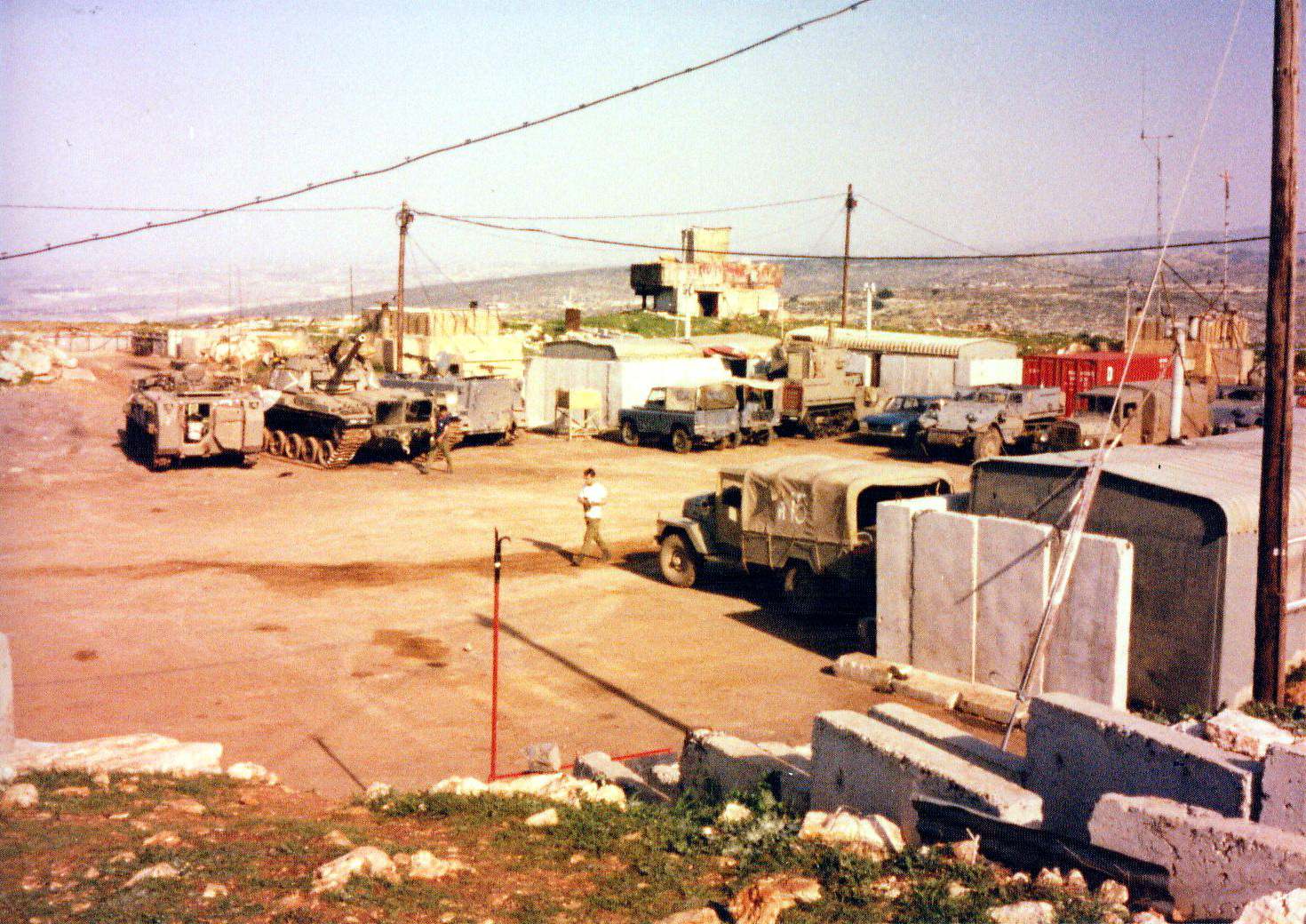
IDF military post Shakuf El-Hardun – south Lebanon, 1986

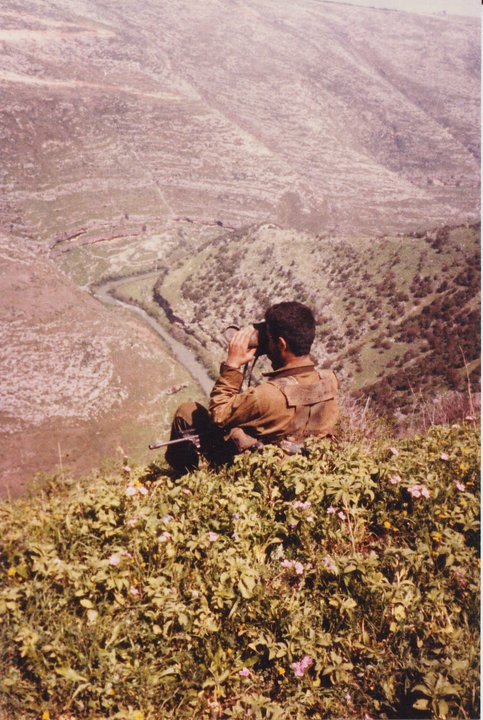
IDF military patrol above the Litani river- south Lebanon, 1987

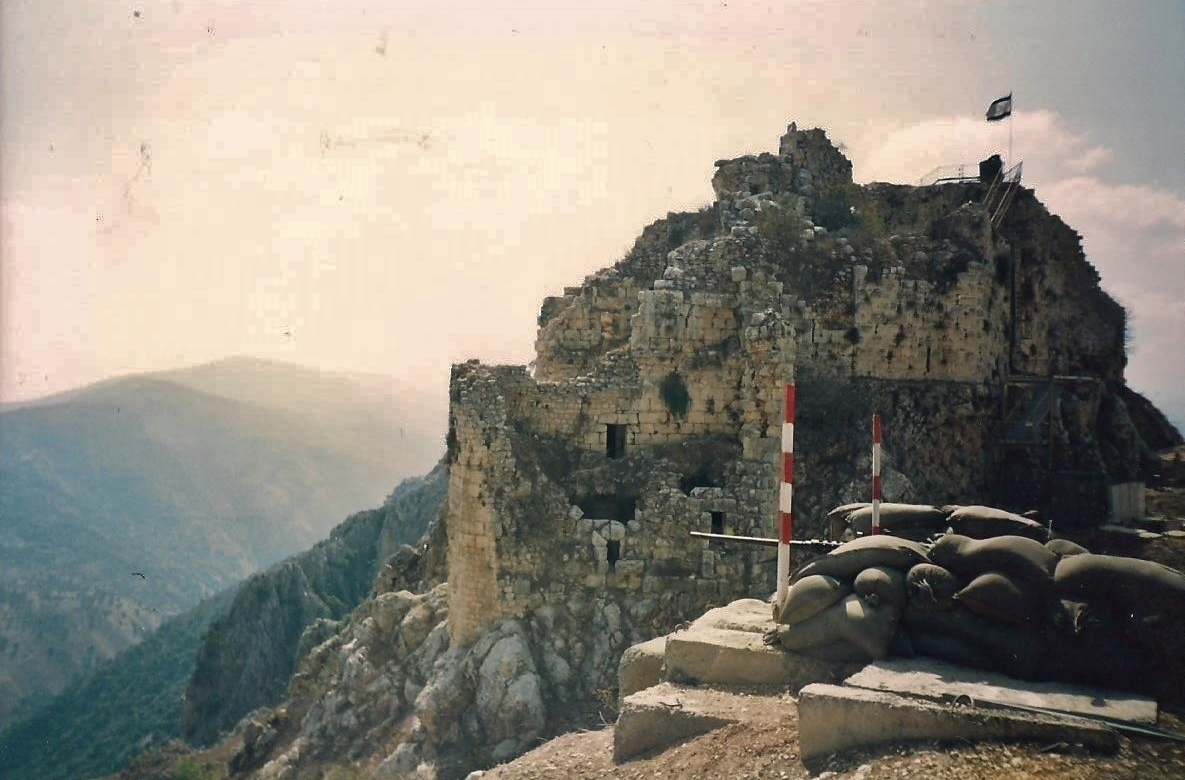
The Beaufort IDF northern military post- south Lebanon, 1995

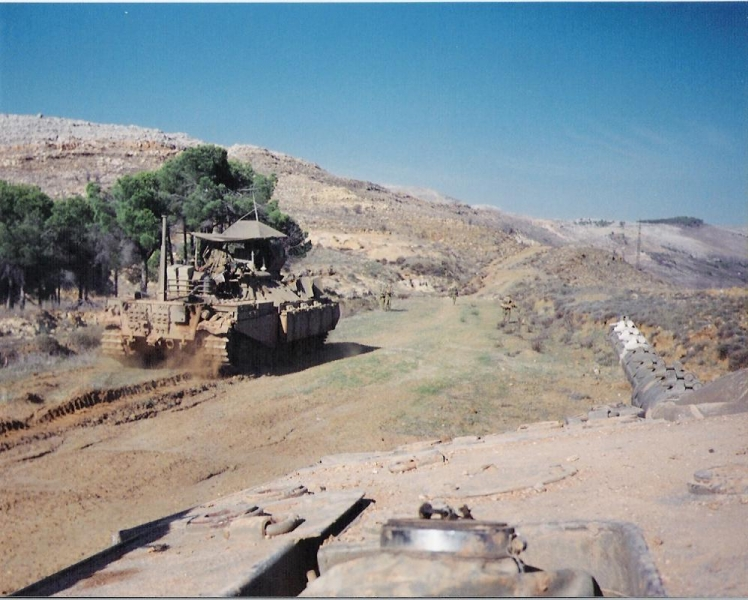
An IDF military patrol between Aaichiye to Rayhan- south Lebanon, 1995

In September 1982, the PLO withdrew most of its forces from Lebanon. With U.S. assistance, Israel and Lebanon reached an accord in May 1983, that set the stage to withdraw Israeli forces from Lebanon while letting them patrol a "security zone" together with the Lebanese Army.

The instruments of ratification were never exchanged, and in March 1984, under pressure from Syria, Lebanon cancelled the agreement.

In January 1985, Israel started to withdraw most of its troops, leaving a small residual Israeli force and an Israeli-supported militia, the South Lebanon Army in southern Lebanon in a "security zone", which Israel considered a necessary buffer against attacks on its northern territory. The Israeli withdrawal to the security zone ended in June 1985. Israel withdrew fully from Lebanon in 2000.

The political vacuum resulting from the 1985 Israeli withdrawal would eventually lead to the de facto Syrian occupation of Lebanon. Syria would gain much more power over Lebanon than what it enjoyed before 1982, but it would no longer align with the PLO. In the War of the Camps that followed the Israeli withdrawal, Syria fought their former Palestinian allies.

=== Relocation of PLO ===
Following Arafat's decision of June 1982, by September 1982, the PLO had withdrawn most of its forces from West Beirut. Syria backed the anti-Arafat PLO forces of Abu Musa in the Beka valley from May 1983. When Arafat castigated the Syrian government for blocking PLO supplies in June 1983, the Syrian government declared Arafat a persona non-grata on 24 June 1983.

With the withdrawal of the PLO leadership from Tripoli in December 1983 there was an Egyptian-PLO rapprochement, this was found to be encouraging by the Reagan administration but was condemned by the Israeli government.

=== Political results for Israel ===
Ariel Sharon requested permission for a military operation that would only go 25 miles into Lebanon, and would only be for 2–3 days. On this basis, nearly the entire Knesset voted in favor of going to war. Only Hadash opposed the war, and even submitted a no-confidence motion against the Israeli government. Hadash Knesset member Meir Vilner said in the Knesset plenary session that: "The government is leading Israel to an abyss. It is doing something that in the course of time might lead to crying for generations". In response, they were condemned, and calls were heard, among others from the editor of Yediot Ahronoth, to prosecute them for treason. Left-wing Knesset members, including Shulamit Aloni and Yossi Sarid, were absent from the plenary for the vote. Even the Labor faction voted in support. By mid January 1983 Rabin was saying that the Israeli attempt to impose a peace agreement on Lebanon by the use of force was a "mistake" based upon an "illusion".

Heavy Israeli casualties, alleged disinformation of Israeli government leaders and the Israeli public by Israeli military, as well as political advocates of the campaign and lack of clear goals led to increasing disquiet among Israelis. This culminated in a large protest rally in Tel Aviv on 25 September 1982, organized by the Peace Now movement, following the 1982 Sabra and Shatila massacre. Organizers claimed 400,000 people participated in the rally, and it became known as the "400,000 rally". Other estimates put the figure much lower, maybe reaching 100,000 Israelis but including thousands of reserve soldiers back from Lebanon.

=== Political outcome for Lebanon ===
The Israeli-Maronite alliance dissolved, and Sharon's goal of installing a pro-Israel Christian government in Beirut was not accomplished. 850,000 Christians emigrated out of Lebanon during the Civil War, most of them permanently.

The withdrawal of the IDF from central Lebanon in the summer of 1983 was followed by one of the bloodiest phases of the Lebanese war, where the Christian Militia (the Lebanese Forces) was left alone to defend the "Mountain" area which comprised the Aley and Chouf districts against a coalition of Druze PSP, PLO remnants, Syrian Army, Lebanese Communist, and Syrian Social National Party. This heavily impacted the civilian population from both sides, with more than 5,000 killed from both sides. The Mountain War ended after the Christian forces and civilians withdrew to the town of Deir el Kamar, where they were besieged for 3 months before all hostilities ceased and they were transported to East Beirut.

The invasion led to the switching of sides of Amal Movement, which used to fight against the PLO prior to the invasion. The invasion is also popularly held to be the major catalyst for the creation of the Iranian and Syrian supported Hezbollah organization, which by 1991 was the sole armed militia in Lebanon not supported by Israel and by 2000 had completely replaced the vanquished PLO in Southern Lebanon.

=== Cold War perspective ===
According to Abraham Rabinovich, the complete dominance of U.S. and Israeli technology and tactics over those of the Eastern Bloc was a factor that hastened the demise of the Warsaw Pact and the Soviet Union. However, this was not the first confrontation in which Soviet weaponry had been outmatched by American weaponry. In many of the Cold War conflicts the Americans and their allies had superior technology. Nonetheless, the gap between the First World and Second World weaponry was more apparent in the 1980s and weighed more heavily on Second World leaders.

=== Long-term consequences ===
One of the lingering consequences of the Israeli invasion of Lebanon was the creation of Hezbollah.

In 2000, when Ehud Barak was Israeli Prime Minister, Israel withdrew from the security zone to behind the Blue Line. Lebanon and Hezbollah continue to claim a small area called Shebaa Farms as Lebanese territory, but Israel insists that it is captured Syrian territory with the same status as the Golan Heights. The United Nations has not determined the final status of Shebaa Farms but has determined that Israel has complied with UNSC resolution 425. The UN Secretary-General had concluded that, as of 16 June 2000, Israel had withdrawn its forces from Lebanon in accordance with UN Security Council Resolution 425 of 1978, bringing closure to the 1982 invasion as far as the UN was concerned.

Israel's withdrawal from Lebanon led to pressure on the Syrians to withdraw their occupation forces and this pressure intensified after the assassination of the popular Lebanese Prime Minister, Rafik Hariri. On 26 April 2005 the Syrian occupation forces withdrew from Lebanon.

=== Other consequences ===
- The invasion removed PLO presence from Southern Lebanon and the Syrian military was weakened by combat losses, especially in the air. However, the removal of the PLO also paved the way for the rise of other militant groups, particularly Hezbollah.
- The failure of the larger Israeli objectives of resolving the conflict in Lebanon with a peace treaty.
- The Lebanese Council for Development and Reconstruction estimated the cost of the damage from the invasion at 7,622,774,000 Lebanese pounds, equivalent to US$2 billion at the time.
- Al-Qaeda leader Osama bin Laden said in a videotape, released on the eve of the 2004 U.S. presidential elections, that he was inspired to attack the buildings of the United States in the September 11 attacks by the 1982 Israeli invasion of Lebanon, in which towers and buildings in Beirut were destroyed in the siege of the capital.
- Egypt recalled its ambassador from Israel—the most serious diplomatic rupture since the Camp David Accords. The move, prompted by Israel’s role in renewed fighting and the Beirut massacre, did not amount to a full break in relations.

== War crimes ==
On 16 December 1982, the United Nations General Assembly condemned the Sabra and Shatila massacre and declared it to be an act of genocide. The voting record on section D of Resolution 37/123, which "resolves that the massacre was an act of genocide", was: yes: 123; no: 0; abstentions: 22; non-voting: 12. The abstentions were: Belgium, Denmark, France, Germany (Federal Republic), Iceland, Ireland, Italy, Luxembourg, the Netherlands, Norway, Portugal, Sweden, United Kingdom, U.S., Canada, Australia, New Zealand, Israel, Ivory Coast, Papua New Guinea, Barbados and Dominican Republic. Some delegates disputed the claim that the massacre constituted genocide.

In 1982, an international commission investigated into reported violations of International Law by Israel during its invasion of the Lebanon. Chairman was Seán MacBride, the other members were Richard A. Falk, Kader Asmal, Brian Bercusson, Géraud de la Pradelle, and Stefan Wild. The commission's report concluded that "the government of Israel has committed acts of aggression contrary to international law", that the government of Israel had no valid reasons under international law for its invasion of Lebanon, and that the Israeli authorities or forces were directly or indirectly responsible for the massacres and killings, which have been reported to have been carried out by Lebanese militiamen in Sabra and the Shatila refugee camp in the Beirut area between 16 and 18 September.

Following a four-month investigation, on 8 February 1983, the Kahan Commission submitted its report, which was released to the public by spokesman Bezalel Gordon simultaneously in Hebrew and English. It concluded that direct responsibility rested with the Gemayel Phalangists led by Fadi Frem, and that no Israelis were deemed directly responsible, although Israel was held to be indirectly responsible:

The decision on the entry of the Phalangists into the refugee camps was taken without consideration of the danger – which the makers and executors of the decision were obligated to foresee as probable – the Phalangists would commit massacres and pogroms against the inhabitants of the camps, and without an examination of the means for preventing this danger.
Similarly, it is clear from the course of events that when the reports began to arrive about the actions of the Phalangists in the camps, no proper heed was taken of these reports, the correct conclusions were not drawn from them, and no energetic and immediate action were taken to restrain the Phalangists and put a stop to their actions.

== In cinema ==
Several films depict events from the 1982 war:

- Cup Final (1991)
- Beaufort (2007)
- Waltz with Bashir (2008)
- Lebanon (2009)
- 1982 (2019)

== See also ==
- 1978 South Lebanon conflict
- 2006 Lebanon War
- 2024 Israeli invasion of Lebanon
- Israel-Lebanon relations
- Israeli occupation of southern Lebanon
- List of extrajudicial killings and political violence in Lebanon
- Multinational Force in Lebanon
- Operation Accountability
- Operation Grapes of Wrath
- Operation Tipped Kettle (US–Israeli government operation transferring weapons seized by Israeli forces from the Palestine Liberation Organization in Lebanon to the Nicaraguan Contras.)
- International Day of Innocent Children Victims of Aggression

General:

- List of modern conflicts in the Middle East
