= PLO withdrawal from Lebanon =

Part of the 1982 Lebanon War – Lebanese Civil War

- Part of 1982 Lebanon War and Lebanese Civil War
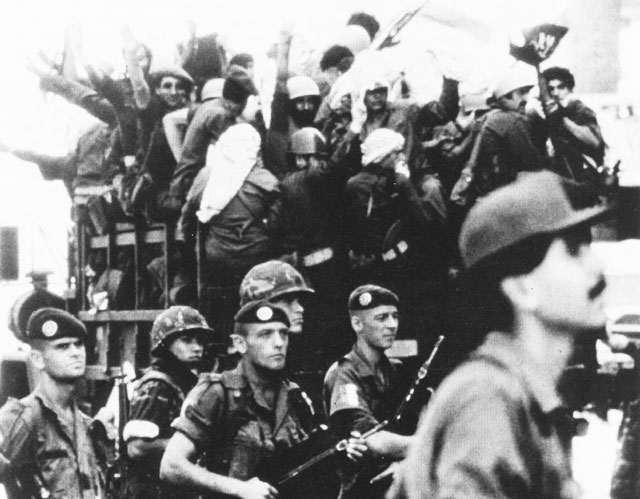
- Marines of the 32nd Marine Amphibious Unit and legionnaires of the 2nd Foreign Parachute Regiment form a joint security guard during the evacuation of the PLO from Beirut, Lebanon.
Date	21 August – 2 September 1982
Location	West Beirut, Lebanon
Result	Approx. 22,000 PLO fighters evacuated to Algeria, Tunisia, Sudan, North and South Yemen, Iraq, Jordan, and Syria.

Parties
(Palestine Liberation Organization) PLO; Supported by: Lebanese National Resistance Front	Israel; Supported by: Lebanese Forces; South Lebanon Army	MNF; (United States) USA; France; Italy; (United Kingdom) UK

The Palestinian Liberation Organization (PLO) withdrawal from Lebanon during the 1982 Lebanon War of most of its forces began on 21 August 1982, under the mediation of United States envoy Philip C. Habib. The withdrawal was prompted by intense military pressure from Israeli forces, which had launched a large-scale invasion of Lebanon in June 1982, dubbed by them "Operation Peace for Galilee". Israel's objective was to expel the PLO, which had established a stronghold in southern Lebanon and was launching attacks into northern Israel. The invasion also aimed to secure a buffer zone and influence the Lebanese Civil War, which had begun in 1975.

The PLO had established its presence in Lebanon in 1971, after being exiled from Jordan following the Black September conflict, where the Hashemite monarchy, led by King Hussein, sought to suppress the perceived growing threat posed by the PLO to its rule. The PLO’s presence in Lebanon, particularly in southern Lebanon and Beirut, significantly contributed to the instability of the country, exacerbating the already volatile situation of the ongoing Lebanese Civil War.

After weeks of heavy fighting between the Israel Defense Forces (IDF) and PLO fighters, particularly around Beirut, which was besieged by Israeli forces, a negotiated settlement was reached. Under the agreement, brokered by Philip Habib, the PLO leadership and thousands of its fighters were given safe passage out of Beirut and dispersed to several Arab countries, including Tunisia, Yemen, Sudan, and Syria. Yasser Arafat, then leader of the PLO, and his command relocated to Tunis, where the PLO established a new base of operations.

The withdrawal of PLO forces effectively ended its strong presence in Lebanon, marking a significant turning point in the Lebanese Civil War and in the Israeli-Palestinian conflict. While the PLO's military presence was removed, the Israeli invasion and subsequent occupation of parts of Lebanon further complicated Lebanon’s political and social landscape, and led to the rise of other militant groups, most notably Hezbollah, which was formed with Iranian support to resist the Israeli occupation.

The aftermath of the PLO's withdrawal also led to several tragic events, including the infamous Sabra and Shatila massacre in September 1982, where Christian Phalangist militias, allied with Israel, killed thousands of Palestinian refugees in camps in West Beirut, while Israeli forces were complicit by allowing the militias to enter the camps.

== Background ==
Plans for an Israeli invasion of Lebanon to remove the PLO were in place as early as the first southern incursion in March 1978. Defense Minister Ariel Sharon said preparations for the attack had been underway "since he took office" in August 1981. Prime Minister Begin postponed the invasion in February and again in April, waiting for the Sinai withdrawal to be finalized. A ceasefire agreement between Israel and the PLO in July 1981 was effective, but Sharon and Chief of Staff Rafael Eitan required backing from the leaders of northern settlements. Sharon outlined three objectives for the war: to crush the PLO, expel the Syrians from Lebanon, and establish a strong central Lebanese government that Israel could pursue a peace deal with.

Philip Habib, a seasoned American diplomat, played a crucial role in brokering the delicate negotiations that led to the PLO's withdrawal from Lebanon in 1982. Appointed as U.S. Special Envoy to the Middle East by President Ronald Reagan, Habib mediated between several hostile parties, including the PLO, Israel, the Lebanese government, and Syria, to secure a peaceful resolution to the siege of Beirut and the wider conflict.

Habib's engagement with the PLO, particularly through indirect negotiations with its leader Yasser Arafat, was a sensitive and complex process. The PLO had entrenched itself in Lebanon since 1971 and, by 1982, had over 10,000 fighters stationed in the country, particularly in and around West Beirut. As Israeli forces surrounded the city in June 1982, a humanitarian crisis loomed for both the Lebanese civilian population and the Palestinian refugees living in the area. The Israeli bombardment of Beirut, aimed at pressuring the PLO into surrendering, led to high civilian casualties, creating international outrage and mounting pressure for a negotiated settlement.

== Negotiations ==
Habib’s diplomacy focused on two primary objectives:

- Organizing the safe exit of PLO fighters from Lebanon to prevent further escalation of violence and protect the civilian population from the ongoing conflict.
- Ensuring the safety of Palestinian refugees, who were vulnerable to retribution from various factions in the Lebanese Civil War and from Israeli-aligned militias, particularly the Lebanese Phalangists.

Habib's negotiations were indirect, as the U.S. at the time did not have formal diplomatic relations with the PLO, which was still considered a terrorist organization by the United States. Nevertheless, through intermediaries, Habib was able to communicate with Arafat and work out the terms for a PLO withdrawal, while simultaneously liaising with Israeli and Lebanese officials to reach an agreement. The negotiations culminated in a multinational peacekeeping force, composed of troops from the United States, France, and Italy, being deployed to oversee the safe evacuation of PLO fighters and to act as a buffer to protect Palestinian refugees and the local population.

Under the agreement, more than 14,000 PLO fighters were evacuated from Beirut between 21 August and 1 September 1982, departing under the protection of the multinational force. Arafat and his top leadership relocated to Tunis, Tunisia, where the PLO established a new base. The fighters were dispersed across various Arab countries, including Syria, Yemen, and Sudan.

On 7 July 1982, US president Ronald Reagan agreed in principle to deploy a small American military force as part of a larger multinational peacekeeping mission to facilitate the withdrawal of the Palestine Liberation Organization (PLO) from West Beirut and prevent a bloody confrontation between Israeli forces and Palestinian fighters.

== Reactions ==
Israeli Defense Minister Ariel Sharon, who watched the evacuation at Beirut’s port, stated that the guerrillas had suffered a devastating defeat, one from which they would struggle to recover. The PLO had lost its "kingdom of terror," from which it had "carried out the most horrific acts against Israel and the world." He also said his forces would stay on high alert during the two-week evacuation period and warned that if there were any delays, they would resume heavy bombardment.

== Aftermath ==
While the withdrawal successfully reduced immediate hostilities in Beirut, the safety of Palestinian refugees remained precarious. Despite the peacekeeping force, which was tasked with protecting civilians in the aftermath of the withdrawal, tragedy struck just weeks later. On 16–18 September 1982, members of the Phalangist militia, a right-wing Christian Lebanese faction allied with Israel, entered the Sabra and Shatila refugee camps and massacred hundreds, possibly thousands, of Palestinian refugees. Israeli forces, which controlled the area around the camps, were accused of allowing the Phalangists to enter and failing to prevent the atrocities.

Habib’s efforts in negotiating the evacuation agreement earned him the US Presidential Medal of Freedom.

Another PLO withdrawal would occur in December 1983 after a battle with pro-Syrian forces in Tripoli. Then 4,000 Arafat loyalists left by sea to northern Yemen, Algeria, and Tunisia in Greek ships that were escorted by a French force.
