= Anthony Tucker-Jones =

British intelligence officer

Anthony Tucker-Jones (born 1964) is a British former defence intelligence analyst and a widely published military expert on regional conflicts, counter-terrorism and armoured and aerial warfare.

Tucker-Jones attended the University of Portsmouth (1982–1985) where he took a BA in Historical Studies before gaining an MA from Lancaster University (1987–1988) in International Relations and Strategic Studies. From 1981 to 1988 he was a freelance defence journalist writing for, among others, Jane's Defence Weekly, Jane's Intelligence Review and Middle East Strategic Studies Quarterly. Tucker-Jones then embarked on a thirteen-year career in defence analysis during which period he was the UK Intelligence Liaison Officer United Nations Special Commission for Iraq (1994–1995) and Liaison Officer for NATO (1991–1994).

Tucker-Jones was the Counter-Terrorism Co-ordinator in charge of Defence Intelligence for the Ministry of Defence (2001–2002) since when he has been a freelance author, commentator and defence and military history author. He has been a commentator on current military issues, intelligence/terrorism and regional conflicts for such media as BBC Radio, Channel 4, ITN, Russia Today, Sky News and Voice of Russia. He has appeared on the History Channel and has acted as an expert witness for the Military Court Service.

== Select publications ==
- Images of War: The Battle for Arnhem
- 1944-1945 (2019)
- Images of War: The Battle for Warsaw 1939-1945, Pen and Sword (2020)
- Falaise: The Flawed Victory, Pen and Sword Books
- Operation Dragoon: The Liberation of Southern France 1944, Pen and Sword Books
- Armoured Warfare on the Eastern Front, Pen and Sword Books
- Tiger I & Tiger II, Pen and Sword Books
- T-34: The Red Army's Legendary Medium Tank, Pen and Sword Books
- The Panther Tank: Hitler’s T-34 Killer, Pen and Sword Books
- The Battle for Budapest 1944-1945, Pen and Sword Books
- The Panzer IV: Hitler’s Rock, Pen and Sword Books
- The Rise of Militant Islam
- Dien Bein Phu
- Kursk 1943: Hitler's Bitter Harvest, History Press Limited, 2018
- Slaughter on the Eastern Front
- The Battle for Warsaw, 1939-1945, 2020
- Hitler's Winter, Just Publishers, 2022
