= United Nations Security Council Resolution 488 =

UN Security Council Resolution 488
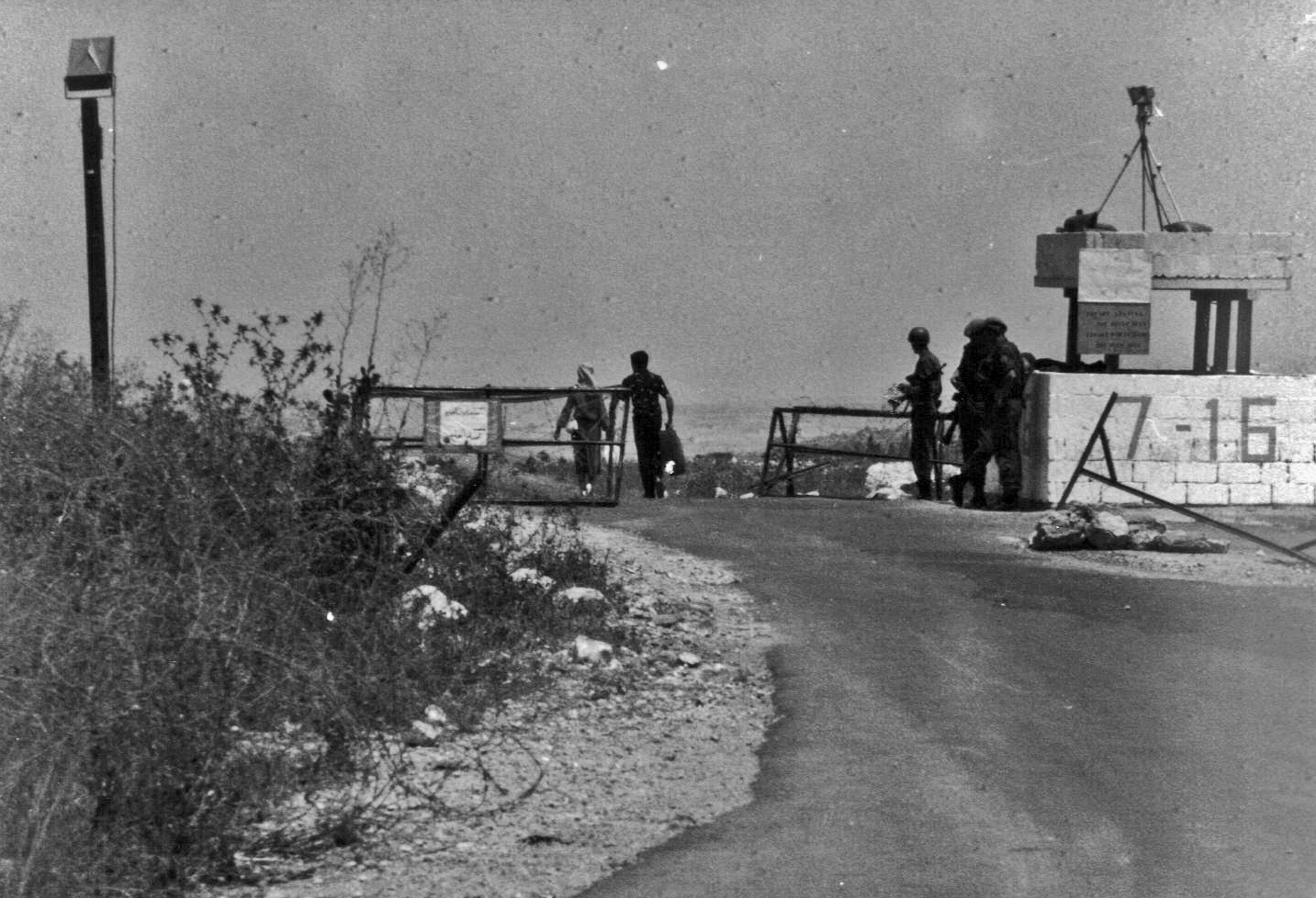
- UNIFIL checkpoint in 1981
- Date: 19 June 1981
- Meeting no.: 2,289
- Code: S/RES/488 (Document)
- Subject: Israel–Lebanon
- Voting summary: 12 voted for; None voted against; 2 abstained
- Result: Adopted

Security Council composition
- Permanent members: China; France; Soviet Union; United Kingdom; United States
- Non-permanent members: East Germany; Ireland; Japan; Mexico; Niger; Panama; Philippines; Spain; Tunisia; Uganda

United Nations Security Council resolution 488, adopted on 19 June 1981, after recalling resolutions 425 (1978), 426 (1978), 427 (1978), 434 (1978), 444 (1979), 450 (1979), 459 (1979), 467 (1980), 474 (1980) and 483 (1980) considering the report from the Secretary-General on the United Nations Interim Force in Lebanon (UNIFIL), the Council noted the continuing need for the Force given the situation between Israel and Lebanon.

The resolution extended the mandate of UNIFIL until 19 December 1981, commending the work the Force did in the area. It reiterated its support for development efforts in Lebanon and requested help to the Government of Lebanon.

Resolution 488 was adopted by 12 votes to none, while East Germany and the Soviet Union abstained, and China did not participate.

== See also ==
- Blue Line
- Israeli–Lebanese conflict
- List of United Nations Security Council Resolutions 401 to 500 (1976–1982)
