= United Nations Security Council Resolution 483 =

UN Security Council Resolution 483
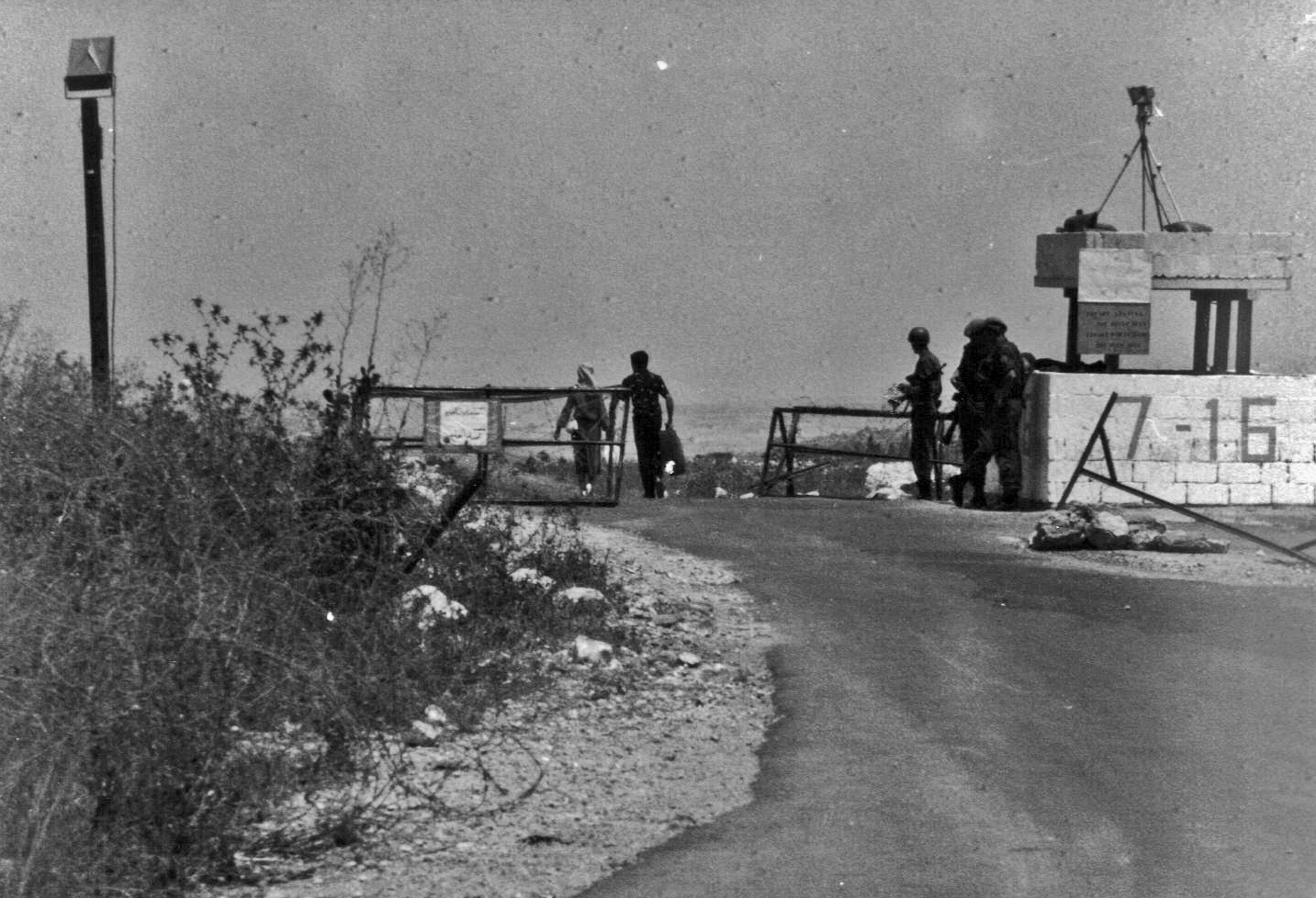
- UNIFIL checkpoint in 1981
- Date: 17 December 1980
- Meeting no.: 2,258
- Code: S/RES/483 (Document)
- Subject: Israel–Lebanon
- Voting summary: 12 voted for; None voted against; 2 abstained
- Result: Adopted

Security Council composition
- Permanent members: China; France; Soviet Union; United Kingdom; United States
- Non-permanent members: Bangladesh; East Germany; Jamaica; Mexico; Niger; Norway; Philippines; Portugal; Tunisia; Zambia

United Nations Security Council resolution 483, adopted on 17 December 1980, after recalling resolutions 425 (1978), 426 (1978), 427 (1978), 434 (1978), 444 (1979), 450 (1979), 459 (1979), 467 (1980) and 474 (1980) and considering the report from the Secretary-General on the United Nations Interim Force in Lebanon (UNIFIL), the Council noted the continuing need for the Force given the situation between Israel and Lebanon.

The resolution went on to extend the mandate of UNIFIL until 19 June 1981, commending the work the Force had done in the area, and in relation to the General Armistice Agreement and the reactivation of the Mixed Armistice Commissions.

Resolution 483 was adopted by 12 votes to none, while East Germany and the Soviet Union abstained, and China did not participate.

== See also ==
- Blue Line
- Israeli–Lebanese conflict
- List of United Nations Security Council Resolutions 401 to 500 (1976–1982)
