= United Nations Security Council Resolution 474 =

UN Security Council Resolution 474
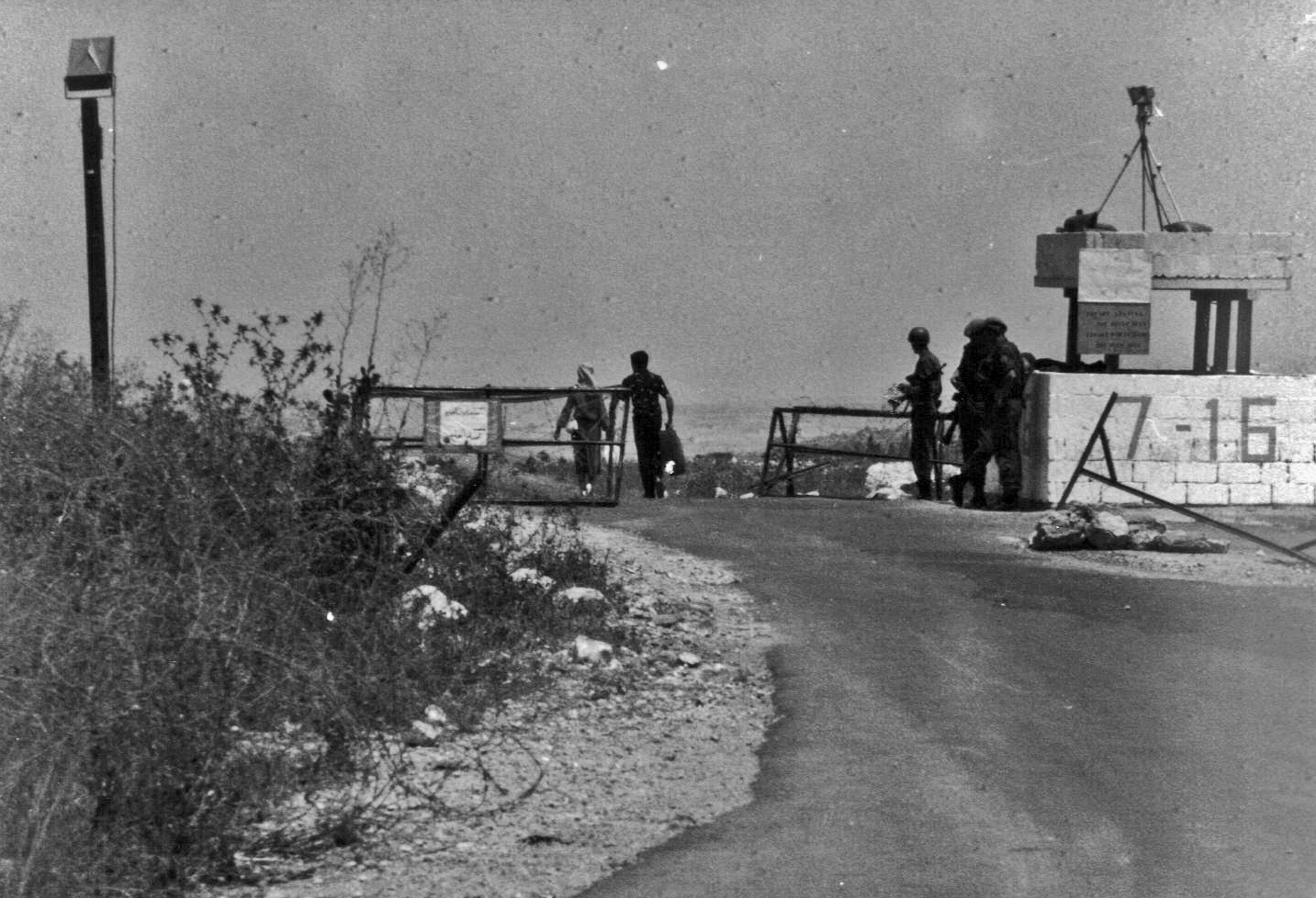
- UNIFIL checkpoint in 1981
- Date: 17 June 1980
- Meeting no.: 2,232
- Code: S/RES/474 (Document)
- Subject: Israel–Lebanon
- Voting summary: 12 voted for; None voted against; 2 abstained
- Result: Adopted

Security Council composition
- Permanent members: China; France; Soviet Union; United Kingdom; United States
- Non-permanent members: Bangladesh; East Germany; Jamaica; Mexico; Niger; Norway; Philippines; Portugal; Tunisia; Zambia

United Nations Security Council Resolution 474, adopted on June 17, 1980, after recalling resolutions 425 (1978), 426 (1978), 427 (1978), 434 (1978), 444 (1979), 450 (1979), 459 (1979) and 467 (1980), and considering the report from the Secretary-General on the United Nations Interim Force in Lebanon (UNIFIL), the Council noted the continuing need for the Force given the situation between Israel and Lebanon.

The resolution went on to extend the mandate of UNIFIL until December 19, 1980, strongly condemning all actions taken against the Force. It was adopted by 12 votes to none, while East Germany and the Soviet Union abstained, and China did not participate.

== See also ==
- Blue Line
- Israel–Lebanon conflict
- List of United Nations Security Council Resolutions 401 to 500 (1976–1982)
