= United Nations Security Council Resolution 1428 =

United Nations Security Council resolution

UN Security Council Resolution 1428
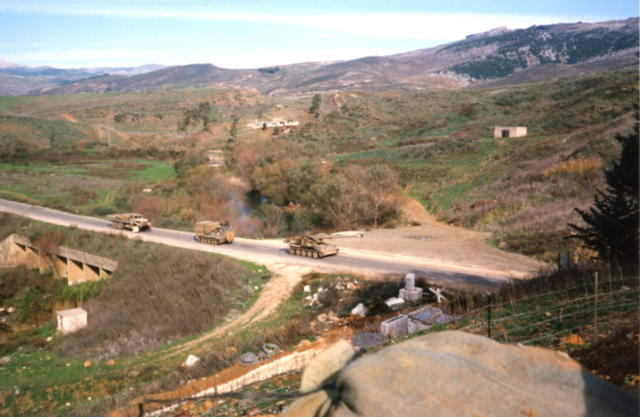
- IDF artillery on Khardala bridge
- Date: 30 July 2002
- Meeting no.: 4,593
- Code: S/RES/1428 (Document)
- Subject: The situation in the Middle East
- Voting summary: 15 voted for; None voted against; None abstained
- Result: Adopted

Security Council composition
- Permanent members: China; France; Russia; United Kingdom; United States
- Non-permanent members: Bulgaria; Cameroon; Colombia; Guinea; Ireland; Mauritius; Mexico; Norway; Singapore; Syria

United Nations Security Council resolution 1428, adopted unanimously on 30 July 2002, after recalling previous resolutions on Israel and Lebanon, including resolutions 425 (1978), 426 (1978), 1310 (2000), 1337 (2001), 1365 (2001) and 1391 (2002), the Council decided to extend the mandate of the United Nations Interim Force in Lebanon (UNIFIL) for a further six months until 31 January 2003.

The Security Council recalled the Secretary-General Kofi Annan's conclusion that Israel had withdrawn its forces from Lebanon as of 16 June 2000, in accordance with Resolution 425. It emphasised the temporary nature of the UNIFIL operation and noted that it had completed two out of three parts of its mandate.

The secretary-general was requested to continue to implement the reconfiguration and redeployment of UNIFIL. The Lebanese government was called upon to create a calm environment and restore its authority in southern Lebanon through the deployment of Lebanese forces. The parties were urged to ensure UNIFIL's full freedom of movement and to ensure its safety. Both Israel and Lebanon were called upon to fulfill commitments to respect the withdrawal line identified by the United Nations and all air, sea and land violations of the line were condemned in addition to drawing the concern of the council.

The resolution supported efforts by UNIFIL to monitor violations of the withdrawal line and efforts in demining. The secretary-general was requested to continue consultations with the Lebanese government and troop-contributing countries concerning the implementation of the current resolution. It further directed him to report on the activities of UNIFIL, including its technical reconfiguration, and on tasks conducted by the United Nations Truce Supervision Organization (UNTSO).

Finally, the resolution concluded by stressing the importance of a just and lasting peace in the Middle East based on relevant security council resolutions including 242 (1967) and 338 (1973).

== See also ==
- Blue Line
- List of United Nations Security Council Resolutions 1401 to 1500 (2002–2003)
- South Lebanon conflict (1985–2000)
