= United Nations Security Council Resolution 467 =

UN Security Council Resolution 467
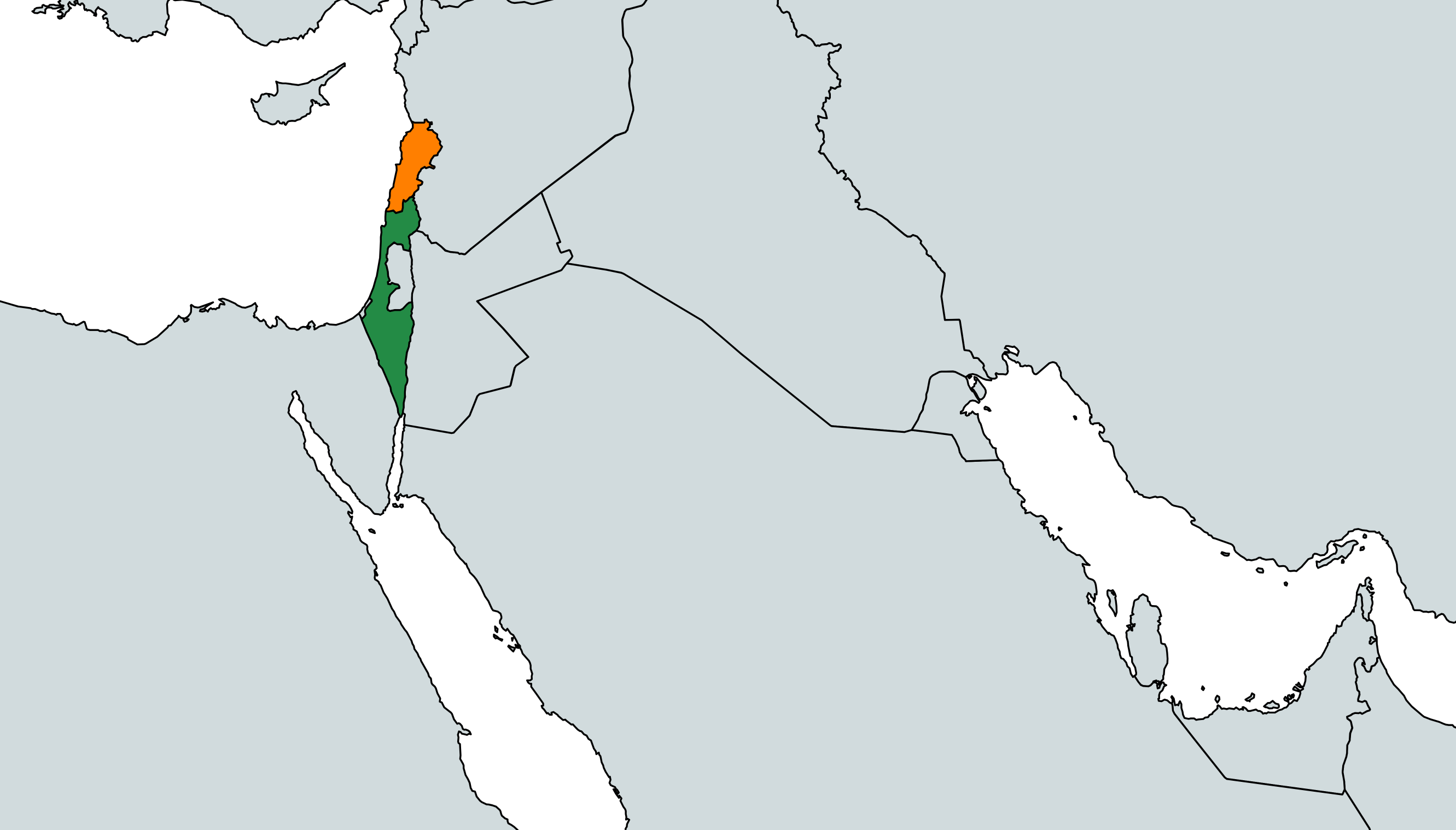
- Israel and Lebanon
- Date: 24 April 1980
- Meeting no.: 2,218
- Code: S/RES/467 (Document)
- Subject: Israel–Lebanon
- Voting summary: 12 voted for; None voted against; 3 abstained
- Result: Adopted

Security Council composition
- Permanent members: China; France; Soviet Union; United Kingdom; United States
- Non-permanent members: Bangladesh; East Germany; Jamaica; Mexico; Niger; Norway; Philippines; Portugal; Tunisia; Zambia

United Nations Security Council resolution 467, adopted on 24 April 1980, having studied the report of the secretary-general and recalling resolutions 425 (1978), 426 (1978), 427 (1978), 434 (1978), 444 (1979), 450 (1979) and 459 (1979), the council reaffirmed the aforementioned resolutions detailing the mandate of the United Nations Interim Force in Lebanon (UNIFIL) and condemned all actions in contravention of the resolutions.

The council went on to condemn the military invention of Israel in Lebanon and all acts of aggression in violation of the General Armistice Agreement and towards the Force, particularly after its headquarters was shelled. With this in mind, the resolution commended UNIFIL for exercising restraint and reminded it that it could use self-defence under certain provisions of its mandate.

Finally, the resolution called a meeting of the Mixed Armistice Commissions and requested the Secretary-General to monitor the progress of the Commissions and the cessation of hostilities.

The resolution was adopted by 12 votes to none against and three abstentions from East Germany, the Soviet Union and the United States.

== See also ==
- Blue Line
- Israeli–Lebanese conflict
- List of United Nations Security Council Resolutions 401 to 500 (1976–1982)
