= United Nations Security Council Resolution 1365 =

UN Security Council Resolution 1365
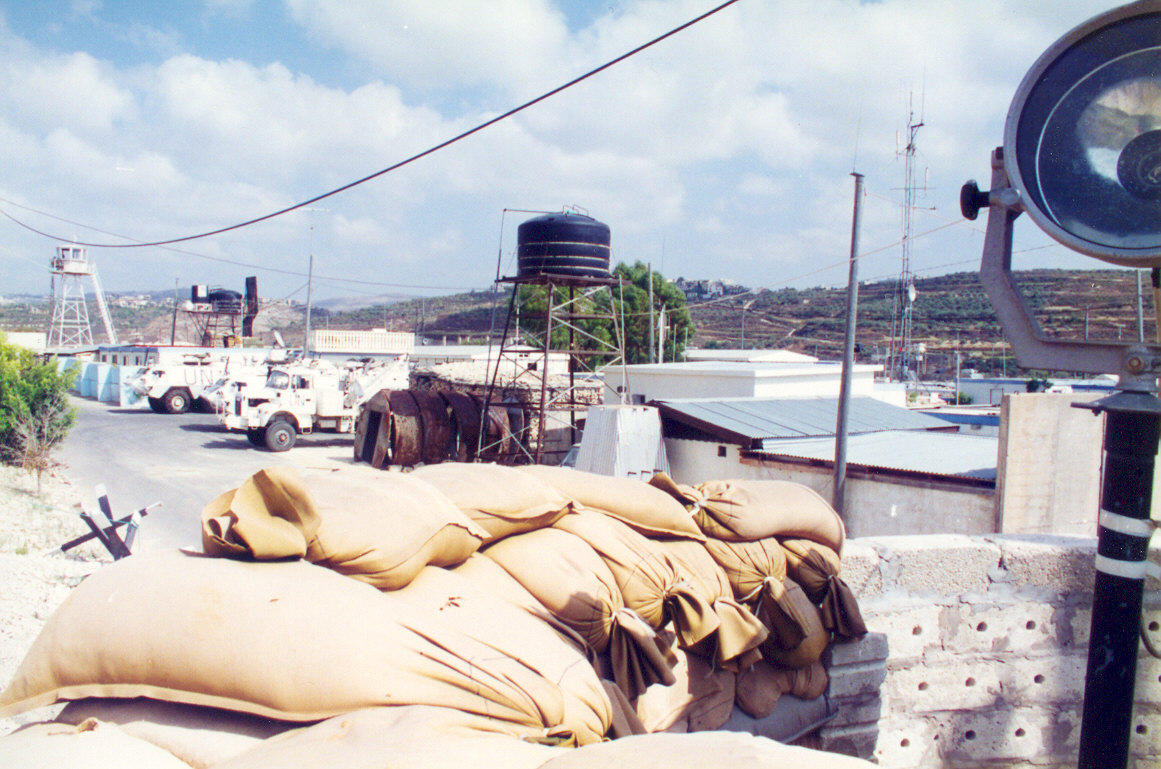
- UNIFIL base
- Date: 31 July 2001
- Meeting no.: 4,354
- Code: S/RES/1365 (Document)
- Subject: The situation in the Middle East
- Voting summary: 15 voted for; None voted against; None abstained
- Result: Adopted

Security Council composition
- Permanent members: China; France; Russia; United Kingdom; United States
- Non-permanent members: Bangladesh; Colombia; Ireland; Jamaica; Mali; Mauritius; Norway; Singapore; Tunisia; Ukraine

United Nations Security Council resolution 1365, adopted unanimously on 31 July 2001, after recalling previous resolutions on Israel and Lebanon, including resolutions 425 (1978), 426 (1978), 1310 (2000) and 1337 (2001), the Council decided to extend the mandate of the United Nations Interim Force in Lebanon (UNIFIL) for a further six months until 31 January 2002.

The Security Council recalled the Secretary-General Kofi Annan's conclusion that Israel had withdrawn its forces from Lebanon as of 16 June 2000, in accordance with Resolution 425. It emphasised the temporary nature of the UNIFIL operation and noted that it had completed two out of three parts of its mandate.

The Secretary-General was requested to implement the reconfiguration and redeployment of UNIFIL. The Lebanese government was called upon to create a calm environment and restore its authority in southern Lebanon through the deployment of Lebanese forces. The parties were urged to ensure UNIFIL's full freedom of movement. Both Israel and Lebanon were called upon to fulfill commitments to respect the withdrawal line identified by the United Nations and condemned all air, sea and land violations of the line.

The resolution supported efforts by UNIFIL to monitor violations of the withdrawal line. The Secretary-General was requested to continue consultations with the Lebanese government and troop-contributing countries concerning the implementation of the current resolution. It further directed him to report on the activities of UNIFIL, including its possible reconfiguration to an observer mission, and on tasks conducted by the United Nations Truce Supervision Organization (UNTSO).

Finally, the resolution concluded by stressing the importance of a just and lasting peace in the Middle East based on relevant Security Council resolutions including 242 (1967) and 338 (1973).

== See also ==
- Blue Line
- Israeli–Lebanese conflict
- List of United Nations Security Council Resolutions 1301 to 1400 (2000–2002)
- South Lebanon conflict (1982–2000)
