= United Nations Security Council Resolution 459 =

UN Security Council Resolution 459
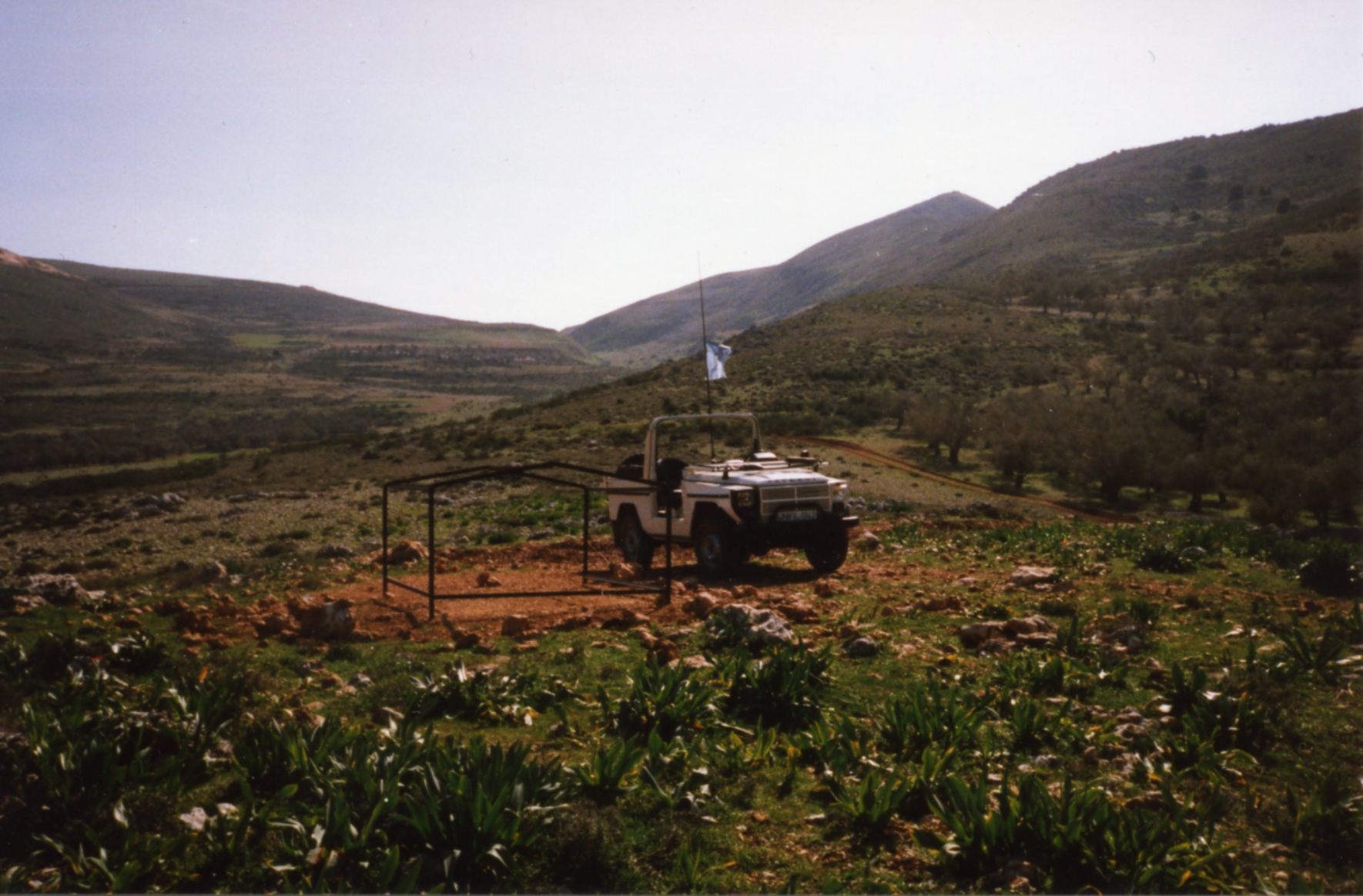
- UNIFIL position in 1989
- Date: 19 December 1979
- Meeting no.: 2,180
- Code: S/RES/459 (Document)
- Subject: Israel-Lebanon
- Voting summary: 12 voted for; None voted against; 2 abstained
- Result: Adopted

Security Council composition
- Permanent members: China; France; Soviet Union; United Kingdom; United States
- Non-permanent members: Bangladesh; Bolivia; Czechoslovakia; Gabon; Jamaica; Kuwait; Nigeria; Norway; Portugal; Zambia

United Nations Security Council resolution 459, adopted on 19 December 1979, after recalling resolutions 425 (1978), 426 (1978), 427 (1978), 434 (1978), 444 (1979) and 450 (1979) and considering the report from the Secretary-General on the United Nations Interim Force in Lebanon (UNIFIL), the Council expressed anxiety about the future of the Force, citing threats to its freedom of movement, security and safety of its headquarters.

The council then reiterated the objectives of the Force, set out in resolutions 425 and 450 which must be attained. The resolution noted efforts by the Government of Lebanon to draw up a programme of action with the secretary-general, as well as its efforts to obtain international recognition for protection of archaeological sites in Tyre. It also reaffirmed the validity of the General Armistice Agreement between Israel and Lebanon, calling on both parties to reactivate the Mixed Armistice Commissions

The resolution went on to commend UNIFIL for its efforts and extended the mandate of UNIFIL until 19 June 1980. The council also warned that continued obstruction of the Force will be considered with further action by the United Nations under the appropriate Chapters in the Charter of the United Nations.

The resolution was adopted by 12 votes to none, while Czechoslovakia and the Soviet Union abstained, and China did not participate.

== See also ==
- Blue Line
- Israel–Lebanon conflict
- List of United Nations Security Council Resolutions 401 to 500 (1976–1982)
