= United Nations Security Council Resolution 1337 =

UN Security Council Resolution 1337
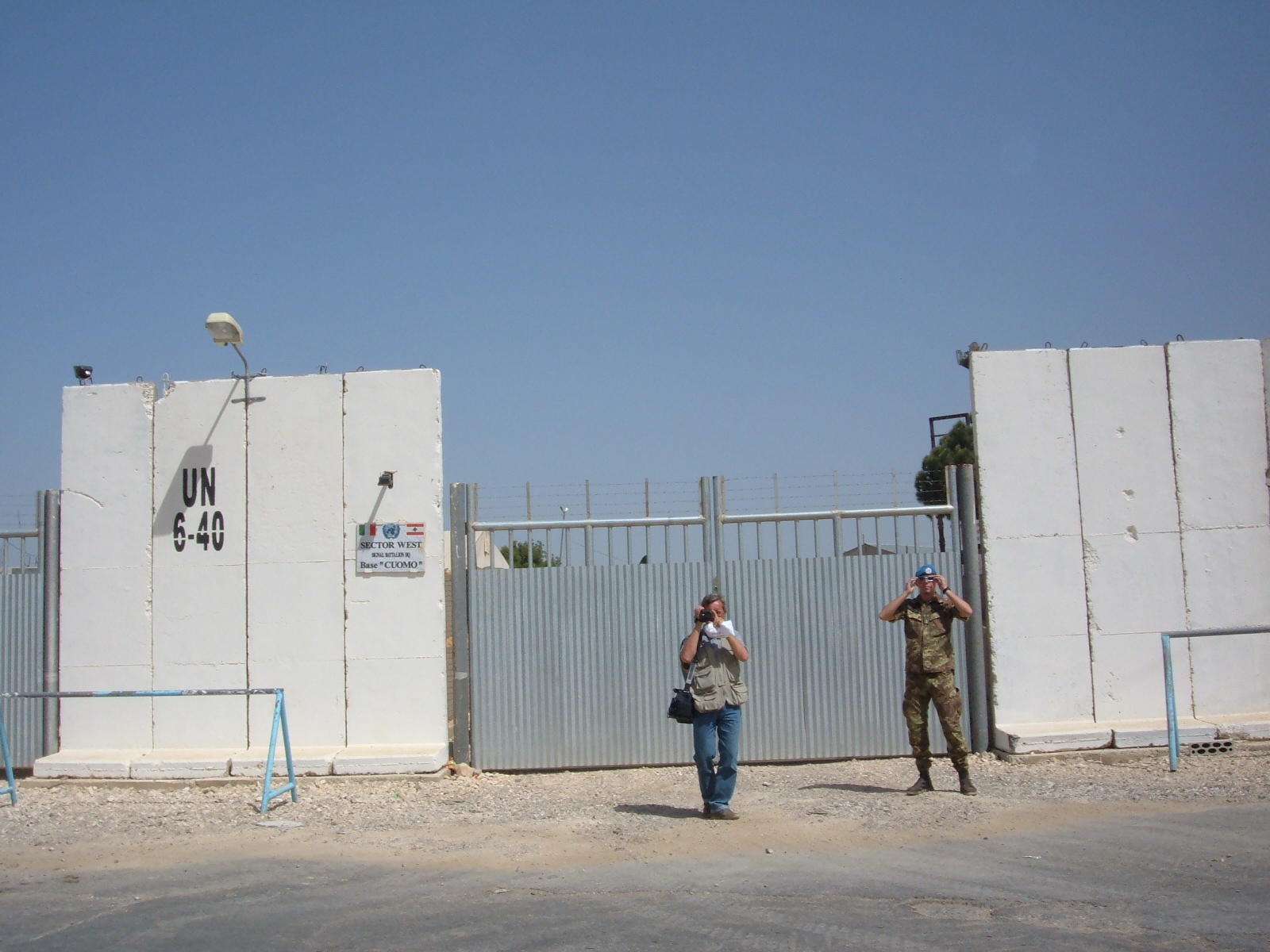
- UNIFIL base
- Date: 30 January 2001
- Meeting no.: 4,267
- Code: S/RES/1337 (Document)
- Subject: The situation in the Middle East
- Voting summary: 15 voted for; None voted against; None abstained
- Result: Adopted

Security Council composition
- Permanent members: China; France; Russia; United Kingdom; United States
- Non-permanent members: Bangladesh; Colombia; Ireland; Jamaica; Mali; Mauritius; Norway; Singapore; Tunisia; Ukraine

United Nations Security Council resolution 1337, adopted unanimously on 30 January 2001, after recalling previous resolutions on Israel and Lebanon, including resolutions 425 (1978), 426 (1978), 501 (1982), 508 (1982), 509 (1982), 520 (1982), and 1310 (2000), the Council decided to extend the mandate of the United Nations Interim Force in Lebanon (UNIFIL) for a further six months until 31 July 2001.

The Security Council recalled the Secretary-General Kofi Annan's conclusion that Israel had withdrawn its forces from Lebanon as of 16 June 2000, in accordance with Resolution 425. It emphasised the temporary nature of the UNIFIL operation.

The Lebanese government was called upon to create a calm environment and restore its authority in southern Lebanon and welcomed the establishment of checkpoints in the region. The Council decided to return the operational level of UNIFIL to 4,500 personnel as indicated in the report of the Secretary-General. Both Israel and Lebanon were called upon to fulfill commitments to respect the withdrawal line identified by the United Nations.

The resolution condemned all acts of violence and violations of the withdrawal line. It welcomed UNIFIL's verification of the Israeli withdrawal and contributions to demining efforts. The Secretary-General was requested to continue consultations with the Lebanese government and other parties concerning the implementation of the current resolution. It endorsed the decision to reconfigure UNIFIL and tasks to be carried out by the United Nations Truce Supervision Organization (UNTSO) and announced a review by 31 May 2001 to consider further steps.

Finally, the resolution concluded by stressing the importance of a just and lasting peace in the Middle East based on relevant Security Council resolutions including 242 (1967) and 338 (1973).

== See also ==
- Blue Line
- List of United Nations Security Council Resolutions 1301 to 1400 (2000–2002)
- South Lebanon conflict (1985–2000)
