= 1978 South Lebanon conflict =

Invasion of southern Lebanon by Israel as part of the Lebanese Civil War

1978 South Lebanon conflict (First Israeli invasion of Lebanon)
- Part of the Palestinian insurgency in South Lebanon, the Lebanese Civil War, and the Israeli–Lebanese conflict
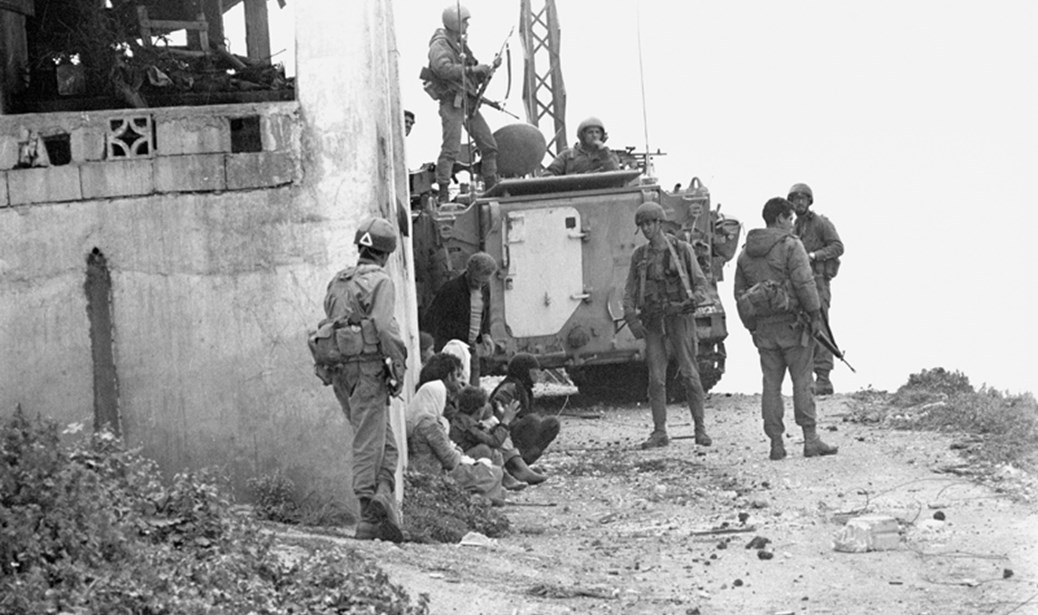
- Israeli soldiers during the invasion
Date	14–21 March 1978 (1 week)
Location	South Governorate and Nabatieh Governorate
Result	Israeli victory
Territorial changes	Palestinian withdrawal from South Lebanon

Belligerents
Israel; SLA	PLO

Commanders and leaders
Mordechai Gur; Avigdor Ben-Gal; Saad Haddad; Antoine Lahad	Yasser Arafat

Casualties and losses
18 killed 113 wounded	300–550 killed
- 1,100 to 2,000 killed in total (both combatants and civilians); 100,000 to 250,000 internally displaced

The 1978 South Lebanon conflict, also known as the First Israeli invasion of Lebanon and codenamed Operation Litani by Israel, began when Israel invaded southern Lebanon up to the Litani River in March 1978. It was in response to the Coastal Road massacre near Tel Aviv by Palestinian militants based in Lebanon. The conflict resulted in the deaths of 1,100–2,000 Lebanese and Palestinians, 20 Israelis, and the internal displacement of 100,000 to 250,000 people in Lebanon. The Israel Defense Forces gained a military victory against the Palestine Liberation Organization (PLO) as the latter was forced to withdraw from southern Lebanon, preventing it from launching attacks on Israel from across its land border with Lebanon. In response to the outbreak of hostilities, the United Nations Security Council adopted Resolution 425 and Resolution 426 on 19 March 1978, which called on Israel to immediately withdraw its troops from Lebanon and established the United Nations Interim Force in Lebanon (UNIFIL).

Israel launched a second invasion of Lebanon in 1982.

== Background ==
Though it took the form of an invasion by the Israeli military of southern Lebanon, Operation Litani arose from the long-running Israeli–Palestinian conflict. After 1968, militant groups that formed the Palestine Liberation Organization (PLO) and other Palestinian groups established a quasi-state in southern Lebanon, using it as a base for attacks against civilian targets in northern Israel as well as attacks on diaspora Israelis and other targets worldwide. This violence was exacerbated by an influx of some 3,000 PLO militants who had fled Jordan following the defeat of Palestinian groups to Jordanian forces during the Black September conflict; the Palestinian political cause began to regroup in southern Lebanon and re-shifted the focus of its attacks to Israeli targets, and did so via the Israel–Lebanon border. Israel responded to Palestinian attacks from Lebanon with extensive air raids against PLO bases of operations.

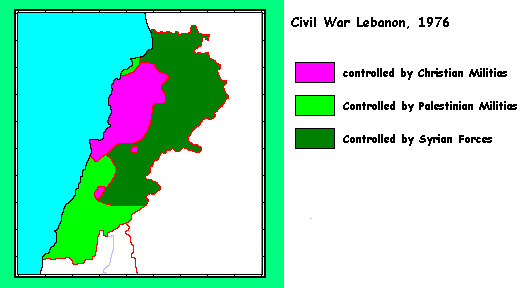
Map showing power balance in Lebanon, 1976: Dark Green – controlled by Syria: Purple – controlled by Maronite groups; Light Green – controlled by Palestinian militias

As a consequence of Israeli aerial attacks from 1968 to 1977, some of the Palestinian towns and camps in southern Lebanon were totally leveled. It is estimated that by October 1977, about 300,000 refugees—mainly Lebanese Shia Muslims—had fled southern Lebanon.

In November 1977, an exchange of gunfire led to the deaths of several people on both sides of the Israel–Lebanon border and led to Israel's bombing of targets in southern Lebanon that killed 70 people, mainly Lebanese.

The proximate cause of the Israeli invasion was the Coastal Road massacre that took place near Tel Aviv on 11 March 1978. On that day, 11 Palestinian Fatah members led by the 18-year-old female fighter Dalal Mughrabi travelled from Lebanon to Israel, where they killed an American tourist at a beach before hijacking a bus on the Coastal Road near Haifa; the group later also hijacked a second bus that was bound for Tel Aviv. After a lengthy chase and shootout, 38 Israeli civilians, including 13 children, were killed and 76 were wounded.

== Course of fighting ==
On 14 March 1978, Israel launched Operation Litani, after the Coastal Road Massacre. Its stated goals were to push Palestinian militant groups, particularly the PLO, away from the border with Israel, and to bolster Israel's ally at the time, the South Lebanon Army, because of the attacks against Lebanese Christians and Jews and because of the relentless shelling into northern Israel. The area south of the Litani River, excepting Tyre, was invaded and occupied in a week long offensive.

The operation began with air, artillery, and naval bombardment, after which IDF infantry and armor forces, comprising about 25,000 soldiers, entered south Lebanon. The Israelis first captured a belt of land approximately 10 kilometers deep, by launching a ground attack on all PLO positions along the Lebanese border with Israel. The ground forces were led by two division commanders, and attacked simultaneously along the entire front. Paratroopers landed from helicopters to capture all the bridges on the Litani River, cutting off the possibility of retreat by the PLO, and later expanded north to the Litani River. Amphibious vessels of the Israeli Navy's Shayetet 11 fleet were used as carrier platforms for helicopters to attack targets on the northern Lebanese coast.

The IDF did not succeed in engaging large numbers of PLO forces, who retreated to the north. Many Lebanese civilians were killed by heavy Israeli shelling and air strikes, which also caused extensive property damage and internal displacement. According to Augustus Richard Norton, professor of international relations at Boston University, the IDF military operation killed approximately 1,100 people, most of them Palestinian and Lebanese. According to IDF reporting and internal investigation, at least 550 of the casualties were Palestinian militants initially holding the front line and killed by the IDF ground operation. According to other sources about 2000 Lebanese and Palestinian were killed.

Estimates for the number of people displaced by the military operations range from at least 100,000 to 250,000. Syrian troops deployed inside Lebanon, some of which were within visual range of the IDF, but did not take part in the fighting. The PLO retreated north of the Litani River, continuing to fire at the Israelis. The IDF used cluster bombs provided by the United States. According to U.S. President Jimmy Carter, this use of the cluster bombs violated the legal agreement between Israel and the U.S. because the weapons had been provided for defensive purposes against an attack on Israel. Israel also transferred American weapons to Saad Haddad's Lebanese militia, a violation of American law. Carter's administration prepared to notify Congress that American weapons were being used illegally, which would have resulted in military aid to Israel being cut off. The American consul in Jerusalem informed the Israeli government of their plans and, according to Carter, Prime Minister Begin said that the operation was over.

== UNSC Resolution 425 ==
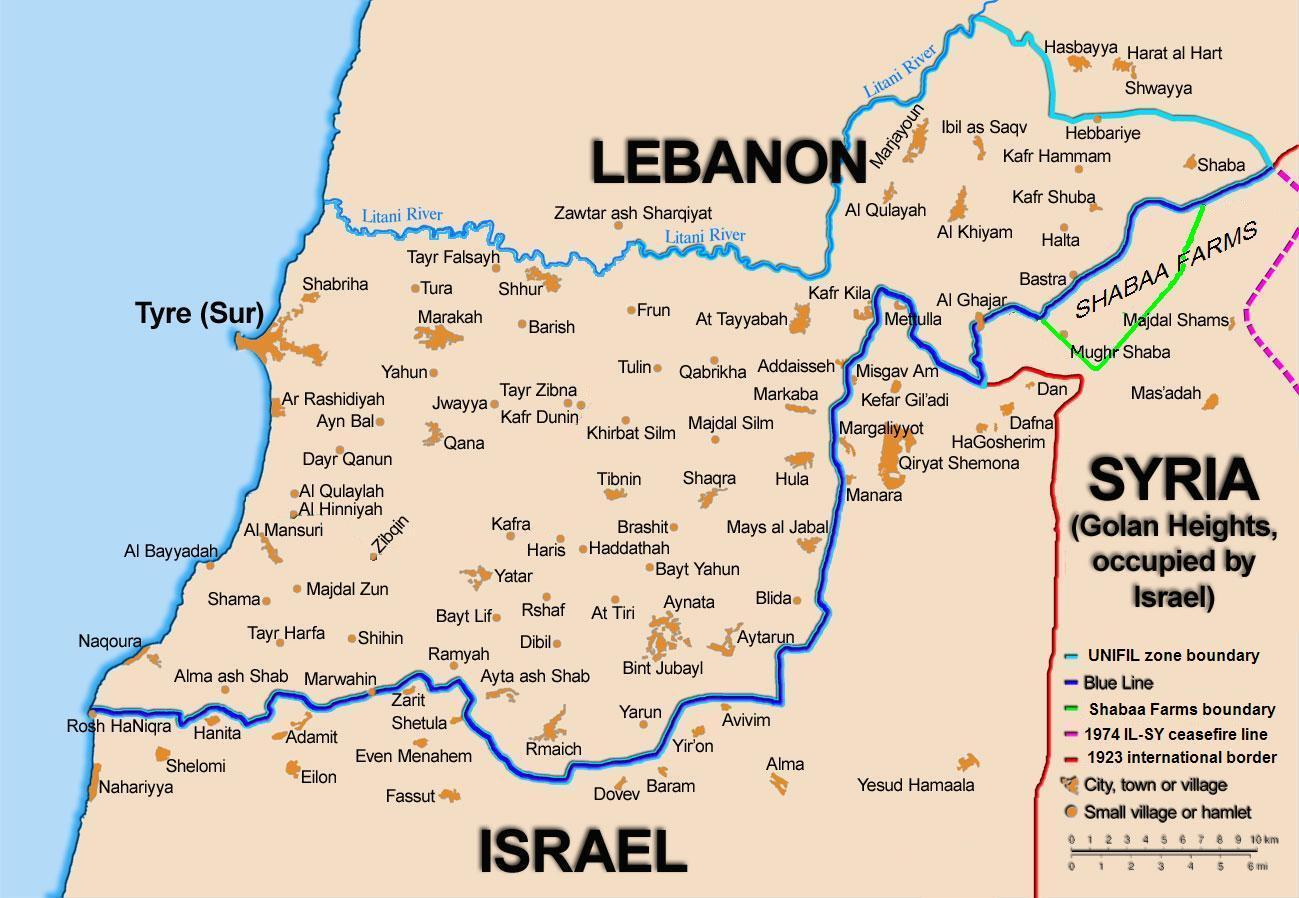
Map showing the Blue Line demarcation line between Lebanon and Israel, established by the UN after the Israeli withdrawal from southern Lebanon in 1978

In response to the invasion, the UN Security Council adopted Resolution 425 and Resolution 426 calling for the withdrawal of Israeli forces from Lebanon were both adopted on 19 March 1978. The UN Interim Force in Lebanon (UNIFIL) was created to enforce this mandate, specifically "for the purpose of confirming the withdrawal of Israeli forces, restoring international peace and security and assisting the Government of Lebanon in ensuring the return of its effective authority in the area". UNIFIL forces arrived in Lebanon on 23 March 1978, setting up headquarters in Naqoura.

Resolution 425 didn't result in an immediate end to hostilities. The Israelis continued military operations for 2 more days until they ordered a ceasefire. The PLO's initial reaction was that the resolution didn't apply to them because it didn't mention the PLO. The PLO leadership finally ordered a ceasefire on 28 March 1978, after a meeting between UNIFIL commander General Emmanuel Erskine and Yasser Arafat in Beirut. Helena Cobban has described the agreement as "a turning-point in the history of the Palestinian resistance moment" because it was the first open acceptance of a ceasefire agreement with Israel that was endorsed by all official PLO bodies.

Parts of the Palestinian resistance movement opposed the agreement and tried to violate the ceasefire. In April 1978, second-level Fatah leader Mohammad Daoud Oudeh (Abu Daoud) organized cells of about 70 to 80 fighters with the intention of breaking the ceasefire. Arafat and Khalil Wazir ordered the arrest of all involved and Abu Daoud was later accused of collaborating with Fatah renegade Abu Nidal to break the ceasefire.

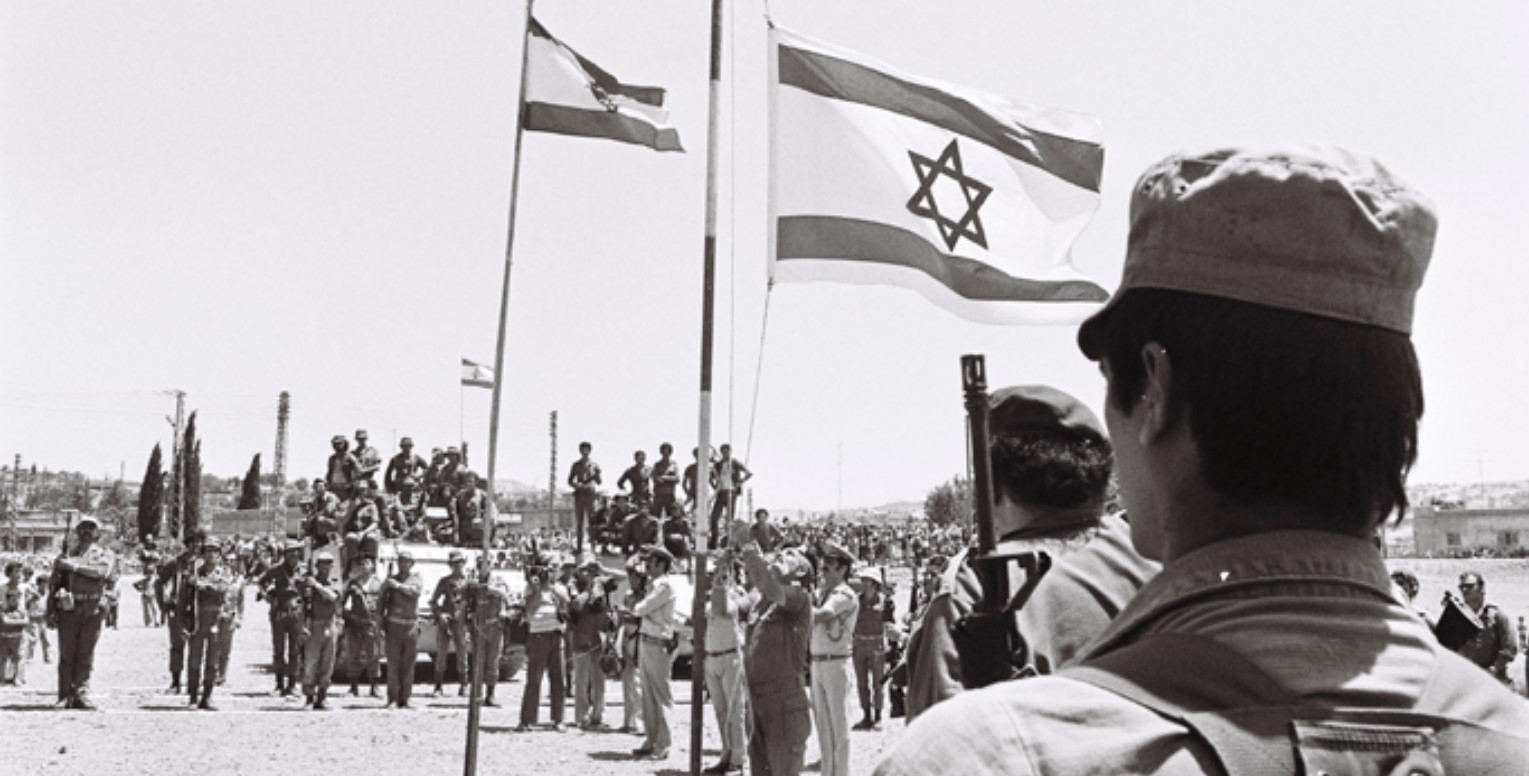
Transfer of the area of Lebanon occupied by the Israeli army to its auxiliaries in the South Lebanon Army, led by Saad Haddad, June 1978

Israeli forces withdrew later in 1978, turning over positions inside Lebanon to their ally, the South Lebanon Army (SLA) militia under the leadership of Maj. Saad Haddad. On 19 April 1978, the SLA shelled UNIFIL headquarters, wounding 8 UN soldiers (Fisk, 138). In April 1980, three Irish UN soldiers (Privates Barrett, Smallhorne and O'Mahoney) were kidnapped and two of them murdered by Christian gunmen. Private O'Mahoney survived (being shot by a sub-machine gun during the incident) in SLA territory; in a separate incident another Irish soldier, Private S. Griffin, was shot by Haddad's men, and was evacuated to Israel where he subsequently died during medical treatment. The Israeli press at the time, particularly The Jerusalem Post, accused the Irish of pro-PLO bias. (Fisk, 152–154).

Palestinian factions also attacked UNIFIL, kidnapping an Irish UNIFIL soldier in 1981 and continuing to occupy areas in southern Lebanon.

Hostilities continued as the Lebanese civil war escalated as fighting intensified in the south. Continued attacks in Israel from the Lebanese based PLO culminated in a second Israeli invasion in 1982 resulting in a flare-up that persisted over the next decade.

== Israeli withdrawal ==
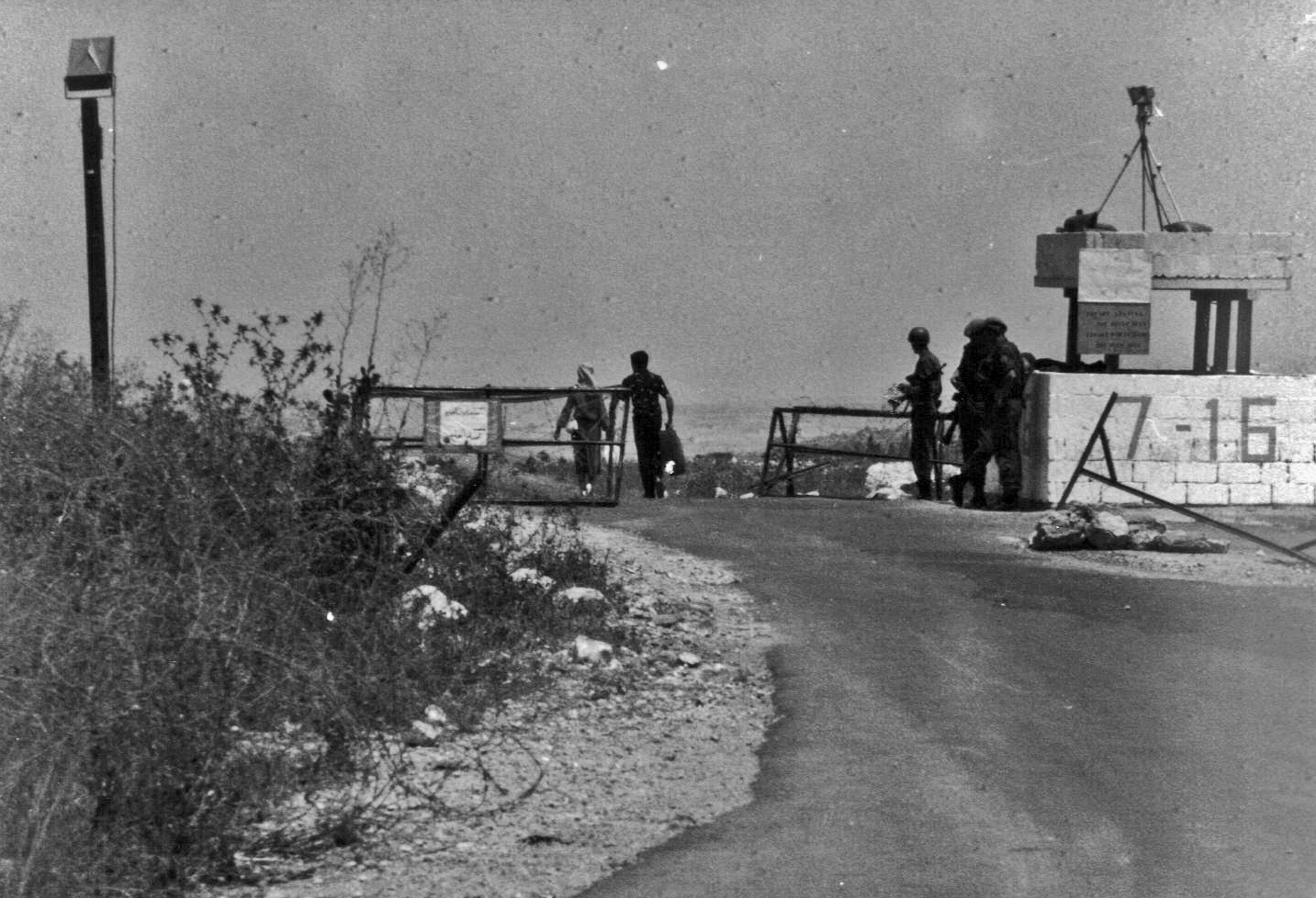
UNIFIL road block in Lebanon, 1981

In 2000, the UN Security Council concluded that, as of 16 June 2000, Israel had withdrawn its forces from Lebanon in accordance with Resolution 425.

Lebanon has not extended control over south Lebanon, though it was called on to do so by Resolution 1391 of 2002 and urged by Resolution 1496. Israel has lodged multiple complaints regarding Lebanon's conduct.

Hezbollah's claim that Israel has not fully withdrawn (see Shebaa Farms) was explicitly rejected by the UN's Secretary-General's report which led to Resolution 1583. The Syrian occupation of Lebanon led to UN Security Council Resolution 1559 demanding the remaining 14,000 (of 50,000 originally) Syrian troop withdrawal and the dismantling of Hezbollah and Palestinian militias. On 26 April 2005, after 29 years of Syrian military presence in Lebanon, the last of the Syrian troops withdrew in accordance with the resolution.

== See also ==
- 1982 Lebanon War
- 2006 Lebanon War
- History of Lebanon
- Israel-Lebanon conflict
- Israeli casualties of war
- Israeli occupation of southern Lebanon
- Lebanese Civil War
- Operation Accountability
- Operation Grapes of Wrath
- List of extrajudicial killings and political violence in Lebanon
