= United Nations Security Council Resolution 450 =

UN Security Council Resolution 450
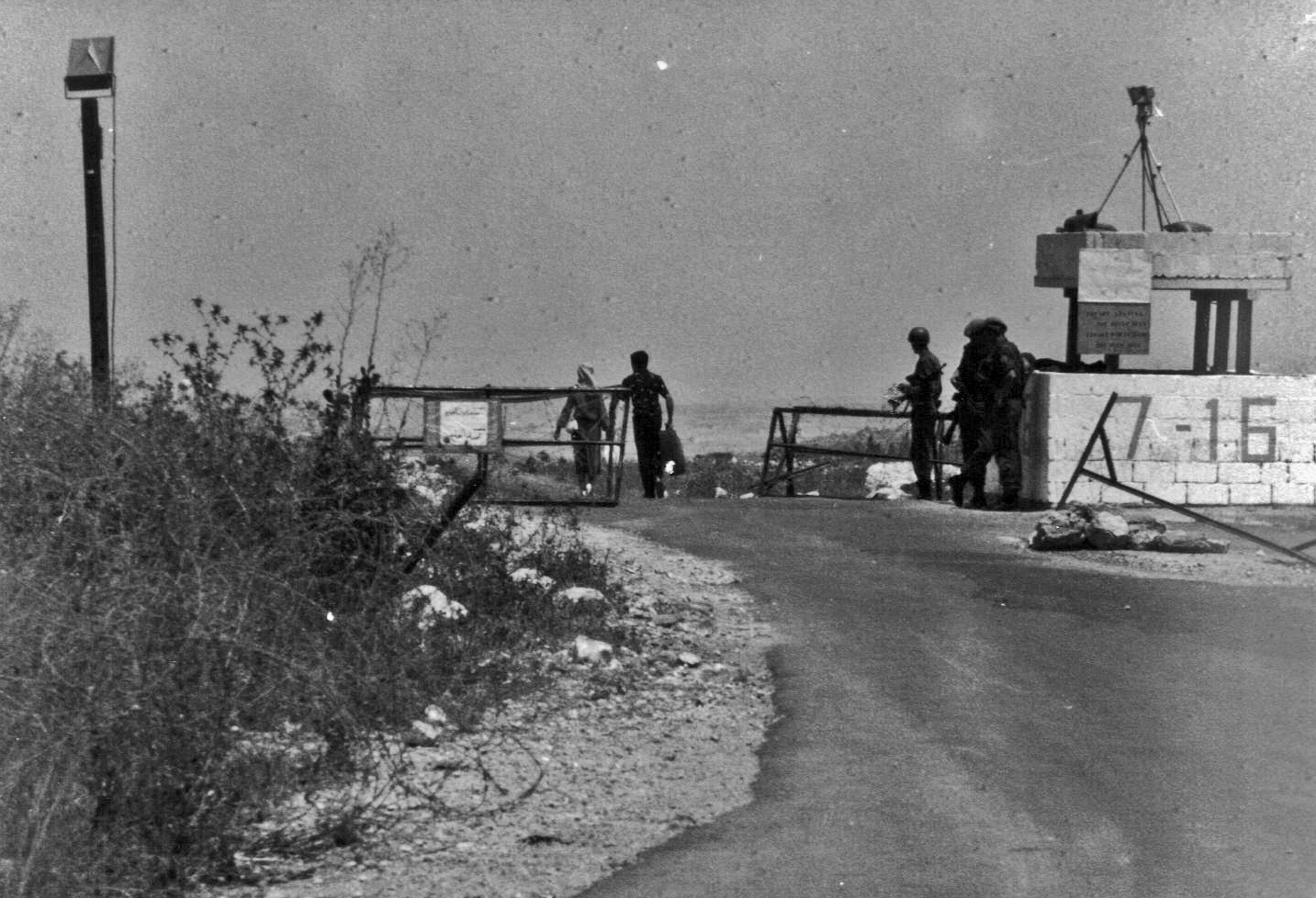
- UNIFIL roadblock
- Date: 14 June 1979
- Meeting no.: 2,149
- Code: S/RES/450 (Document)
- Subject: Israel-Lebanon
- Voting summary: 12 voted for; None voted against; 2 abstained
- Result: Adopted

Security Council composition
- Permanent members: China; France; Soviet Union; United Kingdom; United States
- Non-permanent members: Bangladesh; Bolivia; Czechoslovakia; Gabon; Jamaica; Kuwait; Nigeria; Norway; Portugal; Zambia

United Nations Security Council resolution 450, adopted on 14 June 1979, after recalling resolutions 425 (1978), 426 (1978), 427 (1978), 434 (1978) and 444 (1979) and considering the report from the Secretary-General on the United Nations Interim Force in Lebanon (UNIFIL), the Council condemned attacks by Israel against Lebanon that had displaced civilians, caused deaths and destruction. It called on Israel to cease its actions against the country.

The Council then reiterated the objectives of the Force, set out in resolutions 425, 426 and 444 which must be attained. The resolution commended the work of UNIFIL, adding that it must enjoy freedom of movement and communications to implement the resolution. It also reaffirmed the validity of the General Armistice Agreement between Israel and Lebanon, calling on both parties to reactivate the Mixed Armistice Commissions, and extended the mandate of UNIFIL until 19 December 1979.

The resolution was adopted by 12 votes to none, while Czechoslovakia and the Soviet Union abstained, and China did not participate.

== See also ==
- Blue Line
- Israel–Lebanon conflict
- List of United Nations Security Council Resolutions 401 to 500 (1976–1982)
