= United Nations Security Council Resolution 444 =

UN Security Council Resolution 444
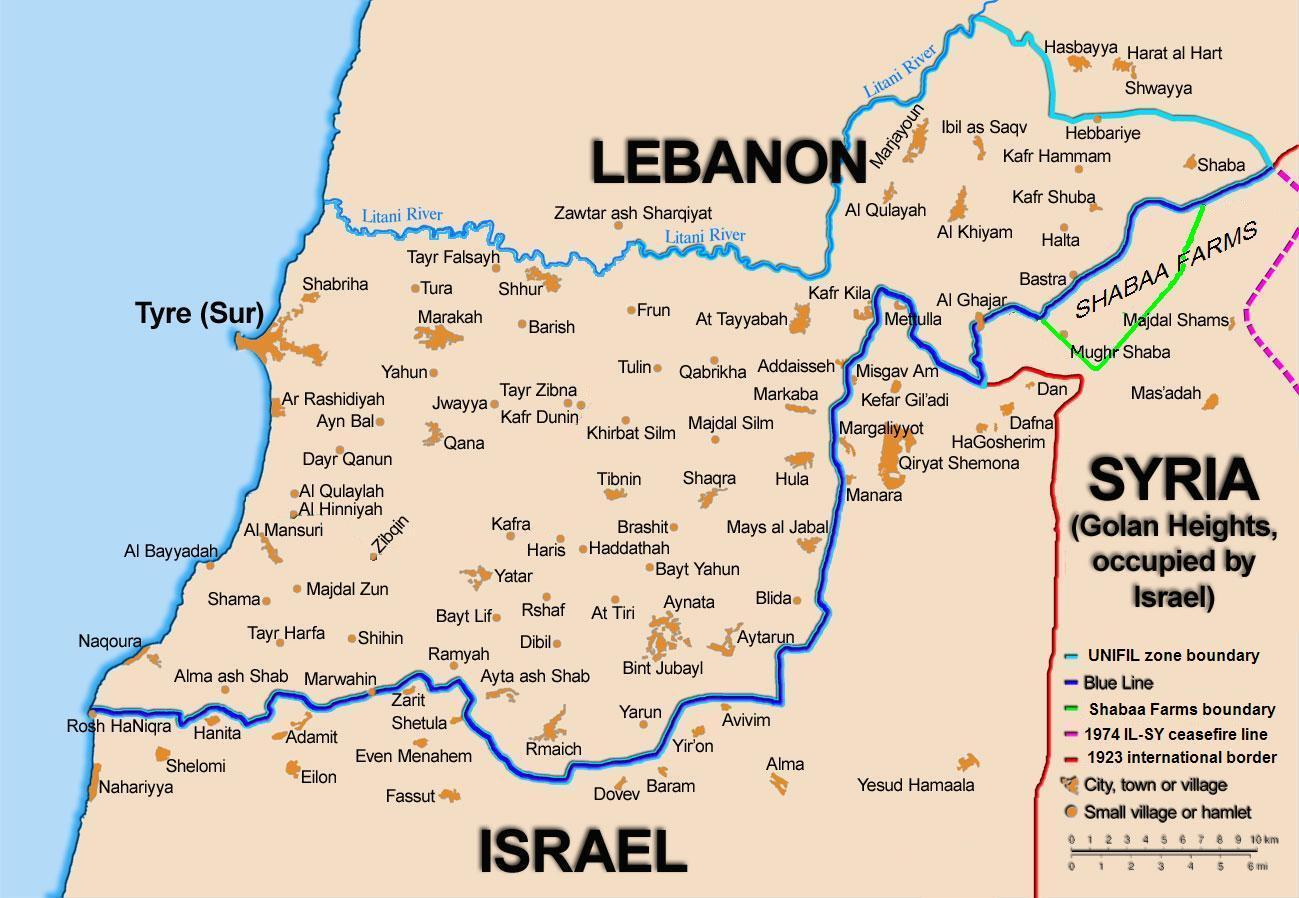
- Blue Line
- Date: 19 January 1979
- Meeting no.: 2,113
- Code: S/RES/444 (Document)
- Subject: Israel–Lebanon
- Voting summary: 12 voted for; None voted against; 2 abstained
- Result: Adopted

Security Council composition
- Permanent members: China; France; Soviet Union; United Kingdom; United States
- Non-permanent members: Bangladesh; Bolivia; Czechoslovakia; Gabon; Jamaica; Kuwait; Nigeria; Norway; Portugal; Zambia

In United Nations Security Council resolution 444, adopted on 19 January 1979, after recalling resolutions 425 (1978), 426 (1978), 427 (1978) and 434 (1978), and considering the report from the Secretary-General on the United Nations Interim Force in Lebanon (UNIFIL), the Council expressed its concern at the situation in Southern Lebanon and noted that UNIFIL had been unable to complete tasks at the end of its second mandate.

The Council went on to condemn the lack of cooperation from Lebanon and particularly Israel with UNIFIL regarding the implementation of its mandate. Resolution 444 also commended the Government of Lebanon for its attempts to re-establish authority in Southern Lebanon. This came in the context of the Lebanese Civil War

By extending the mandate of the Force until 19 June 1979, the resolution asked UNIFIL, in conjunction with the Secretary-General, to help restore order and authority in the region, including the full implementation of Resolution 425.

The resolution was adopted by 12 votes to none, while Czechoslovakia and the Soviet Union abstained, and China did not participate.

== See also ==
- 1978 South Lebanon conflict
- Blue Line
- List of United Nations Security Council Resolutions 401 to 500 (1976–1982)
