= United Nations Security Council Resolution 1310 =

UN Security Council Resolution 1310
- UNIFIL ribbon bar
- Date: 27 July 2000
- Meeting no.: 4,177
- Code: S/RES/1310 (Document)
- Subject: The situation in the Middle East
- Voting summary: 15 voted for; None voted against; None abstained
- Result: Adopted

Security Council composition
- Permanent members: China; France; Russia; United Kingdom; United States
- Non-permanent members: Argentina; Bangladesh; Canada; Jamaica; Malaysia; Mali; Namibia; Netherlands; Tunisia; Ukraine

United Nations Security Council resolution 1310, adopted unanimously on 27 July 2000, after recalling previous resolutions on Israel and Lebanon, including resolutions 425 (1978), 426 (1978), 501 (1982), 508 (1982), 509 (1982) and 520 (1982), as well as Resolution 1308 (2000), the Council decided to extend the mandate of the United Nations Interim Force in Lebanon (UNIFIL) for a further six months until 31 January 2001.

The security council recalled the Secretary-General Kofi Annan's conclusion that Israel had withdrawn its forces from Lebanon as of 16 June 2000, in accordance with Resolution 425. It endorsed the understanding in the report of the Secretary-General that UNIFIL would deploy fully throughout its area of operation and the Government of Lebanon would strengthen its presence in the area. The council also welcomed the removal of violations of the withdrawal line by the Government of Israel and called on the parties to respect the line.

The Lebanese government was called upon to create a calm environment and restore its authority in southern Lebanon and welcomed the establishment of checkpoints in the region. The Council emphasised the interim nature of UNIFIL, and anticipated its early fulfilment. It welcomed the intention of the Secretary-General to submit a report by 31 October 2000 on progress towards achieving the objectives of Resolution 425 and the original tasks assigned to UNIFIL. The situation would be reviewed by early November 2000.

Finally, the resolution concluded by stressing the importance of a just and lasting peace in the Middle East based on relevant Security Council resolutions including 242 (1967) and 338 (1973).

== See also ==
- List of United Nations Security Council Resolutions 1301 to 1400 (2000–2002)
- South Lebanon conflict (1985–2000)
