= United Nations Security Council Resolution 434 =

UN Security Council Resolution 434
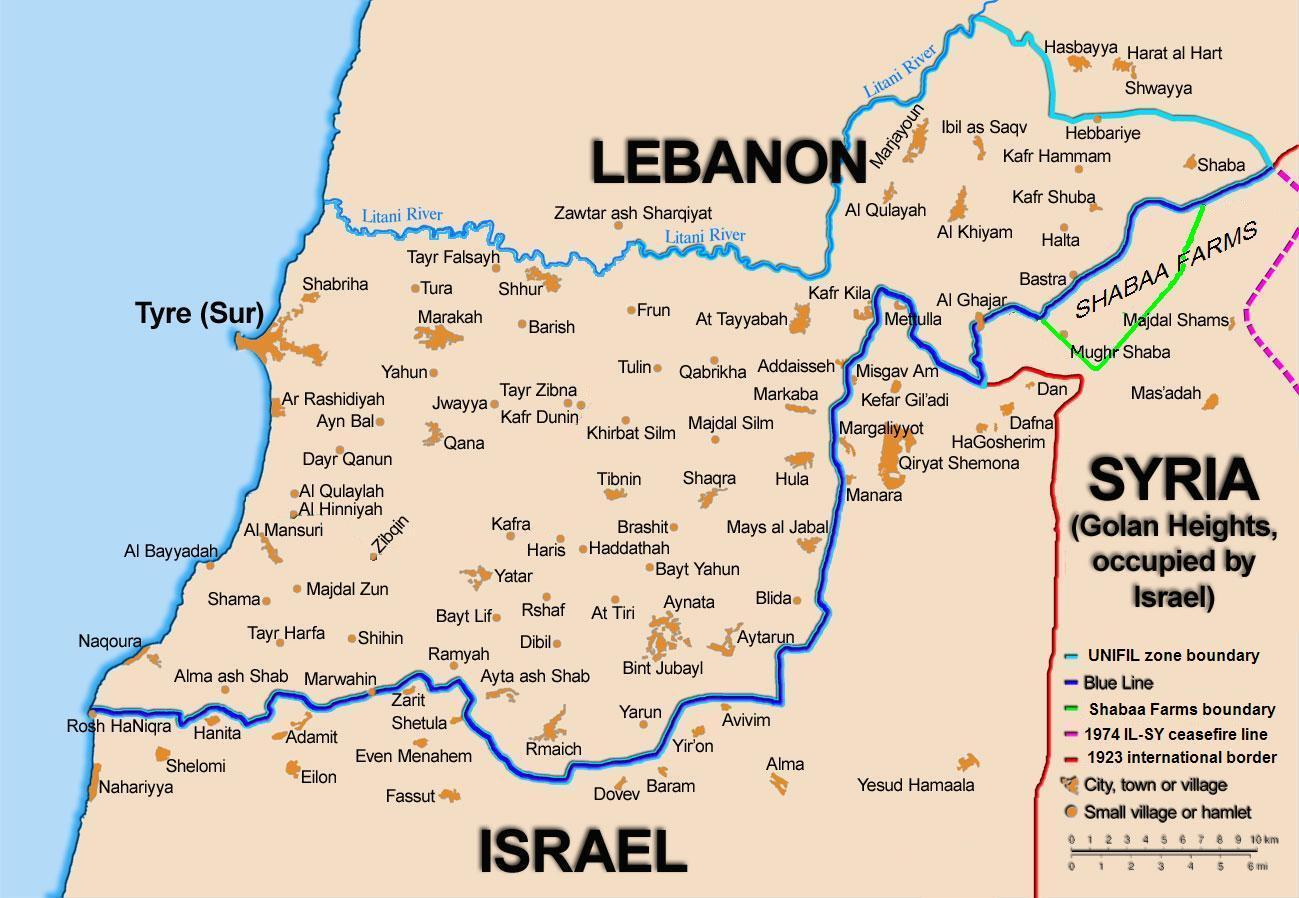
- Blue Line
- Date: 18 September 1978
- Meeting no.: 2,085
- Code: S/RES/434 (Document)
- Subject: Israel-Lebanon
- Voting summary: 12 voted for; None voted against; 2 abstained
- Result: Adopted

Security Council composition
- Permanent members: China; France; Soviet Union; United Kingdom; United States
- Non-permanent members: Bolivia; Canada; Czechoslovakia; Gabon; India; Kuwait; Mauritius; Nigeria; Venezuela; West Germany

United Nations Security Council Resolution 434, adopted on September 18, 1978, after reaffirming previous resolutions, including 425 (1978), 426 (1978) and 427 (1978), the Council commended the United Nations Interim Force in Lebanon for its work in Southern Lebanon, but expressed concern for the situation in Lebanon as a whole. The decision came in the context of the Lebanese Civil War and Palestinian insurgency in South Lebanon.

The council also noted with concern the fact that the UN Interim Force could not operate freely throughout the area, while expressing grief at the loss of some of its members. Therefore, in response to a request from the Government of Lebanon, the council:

(a) renewed the mandate of United Nations Interim Force for four months until January 19, 1979;
(b) called upon Israel, Lebanon and others to implement the prior resolutions;
(c) requested the Secretary-General to report in two months on the progress made on implementing the resolution.

Resolution 434 was adopted by 12 votes to none, while Czechoslovakia and the Soviet Union abstained, and China did not participate.

== See also ==
- 1978 South Lebanon conflict
- Blue Line
- History of Lebanon
- List of United Nations Security Council Resolutions 401 to 500 (1976–1982)
