= United Nations Security Council Resolution 427 =

UN Security Council Resolution 427
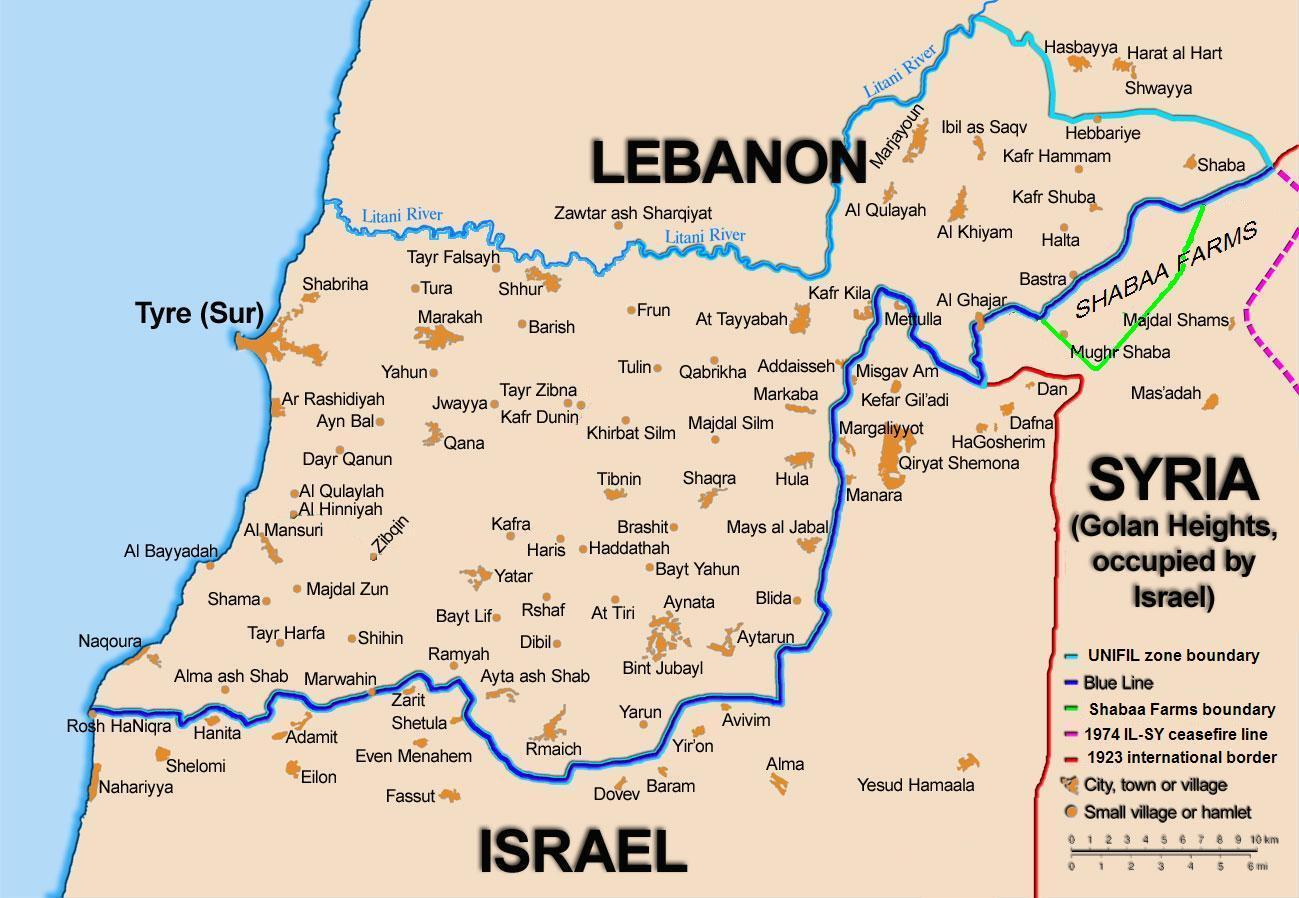
- Location of the Blue Line
- Date: 3 May 1978
- Meeting no.: 2,076
- Code: S/RES/427 (Document)
- Subject: Israel-Lebanon
- Voting summary: 12 voted for; None voted against; 2 abstained
- Result: Adopted

Security Council composition
- Permanent members: China; France; Soviet Union; United Kingdom; United States
- Non-permanent members: Bolivia; Canada; Czechoslovakia; Gabon; India; Kuwait; Mauritius; Nigeria; Venezuela; West Germany

United Nations Security Council Resolution 427, adopted on May 3, 1978, after considering a letter by the Secretary-General, the council decided to increase the strength of the United Nations Interim Force in Lebanon (UNIFIL) from 4,000 to 6,000 troops.

While noting that some Israeli troops had withdrawn from Lebanon, it asked Israel to complete its withdrawal without further delay. The resolution went on to condemn all attacks by both parties on the UNIFIL peacekeeping force and demanded respect for the force. The decision came in the aftermath of the 1978 South Lebanon conflict during Lebanese Civil War.

The resolution was adopted by 12 votes to none; Czechoslovakia and the Soviet Union abstained while the People's Republic of China did not participate in voting.

== See also ==
- Palestinian insurgency in South Lebanon
- Blue Line
- History of Lebanon
- List of United Nations Security Council Resolutions 401 to 500 (1976–1982)
