= United Nations Security Council Resolution 425 =

1978 UNSC resolution on the Israeli invasion of Lebanon during the Lebanese Civil War

UN Security Council Resolution 425
- Middle East
- Date: 19 March 1978
- Meeting no.: 2,074
- Code: S/RES/425 (Document)
- Subject: Israel-Lebanon
- Voting summary: 12 voted for; None voted against; 2 abstained
- Result: Adopted

Security Council composition
- Permanent members: China; France; Soviet Union; United Kingdom; United States
- Non-permanent members: Bolivia; Canada; Czechoslovakia; Gabon; India; Kuwait; Mauritius; Nigeria; Venezuela; West Germany

United Nations Security Council Resolution 425, adopted on 19 March 1978, five days after the Israeli invasion of Lebanon in the context of Palestinian insurgency in South Lebanon and the Lebanese Civil War, called on Israel to withdraw immediately its forces from Lebanon and established the United Nations Interim Force In Lebanon (UNIFIL). It was adopted by 12 votes to none; Czechoslovakia and the Soviet Union abstained, and China did not participate.

== Background ==
On 11 March 1978, Palestine Liberation Organization (PLO) operatives, led by Dalal Mugrabi, carried out the Coastal Road massacre within Israel which resulted in the deaths of 37 Israelis, including 13 children, and 76 wounded. In response, Israeli forces invaded southern Lebanon from which the PLO operated regularly during the 1970s. Starting on the night of 14–15 March and culminating a few days later, Israel Defense Forces (IDF) troops occupied the entire southern part of the country except for the city of Tyre and its surrounding area. This operation is known in Israel as Operation Litani, the stated objective of which was to clear out PLO bases in Lebanon south of the Litani River, in order to better secure northern Israel and to support the Christian Lebanese militias in the course of the Lebanese Civil War - most notably the Free Lebanon Army. On 15 March 1978 the Lebanese government submitted a strong protest to the United Nations Security Council against the Israeli invasion, stating that it had no connection with the Palestinian operation.

On 19 March 1978 the U.N. Security Council adopted Resolution 425, in which it called upon Israel to cease immediately its military action and withdraw its forces from Lebanese territory. It also established the United Nations Interim Force in Lebanon (UNIFIL), the objective of which was to bring about and confirm withdrawal of Israeli forces, restore international peace and security, and to help the Lebanese Government restore its effective authority in southern Lebanon.

== The resolution text ==
The Security Council,

Taking note of the letters from the Permanent Representative of Lebanon and from the Permanent Representative of Israel,
Having heard the statement of the Permanent Representatives of Lebanon and Israel,
Gravely concerned at the deterioration of the situation in the Middle East and its consequences to the maintenance of international peace,
Convinced that the present situation impedes the achievement of a just peace in the Middle East,

1. Calls for strict respect for the territorial integrity, sovereignty and political independence of Lebanon within its internationally recognized boundaries;
2. Calls upon Israel immediately to cease its military action against Lebanese territorial integrity and withdraw forthwith its forces from all Lebanese territory;
3. Decides, in the light of the request of the Government of Lebanon, to establish immediately under its authority a United Nations interim force for Southern Lebanon for the purpose of confirming the withdrawal of Israeli forces, restoring international peace and security and assisting the Government of Lebanon in ensuring the return of its effective authority in the area, the Force to be composed of personnel drawn from Member States;
4. Requests the Secretary-General to report to the Council within twenty-four hours on the implementation of the present resolution.

== Implementation ==
The first UNIFIL troops arrived in Lebanon on 23 March 1978, just four days after the resolution was passed, and Israel withdrew its forces by June 1978. Israel maintained a presence through its proxy South Lebanon Army.

== Aftermath ==
PLO attacks from south Lebanon continued, and Israel launched a larger-scale invasion in June 1982 in which Israeli and Lebanese Christian forces occupied the Lebanese capital city of Beirut in the 1982 Lebanon War. In the aftermath of the IDF’s retreat south Israel maintained a security zone inside Lebanon. In May 2000, Israel withdrew its troops from southern Lebanon. Before the withdrawal, opposition voices inside Israel pressured the government to withdraw, as they saw no valid reason to stay there and sustain Lebanese attacks.

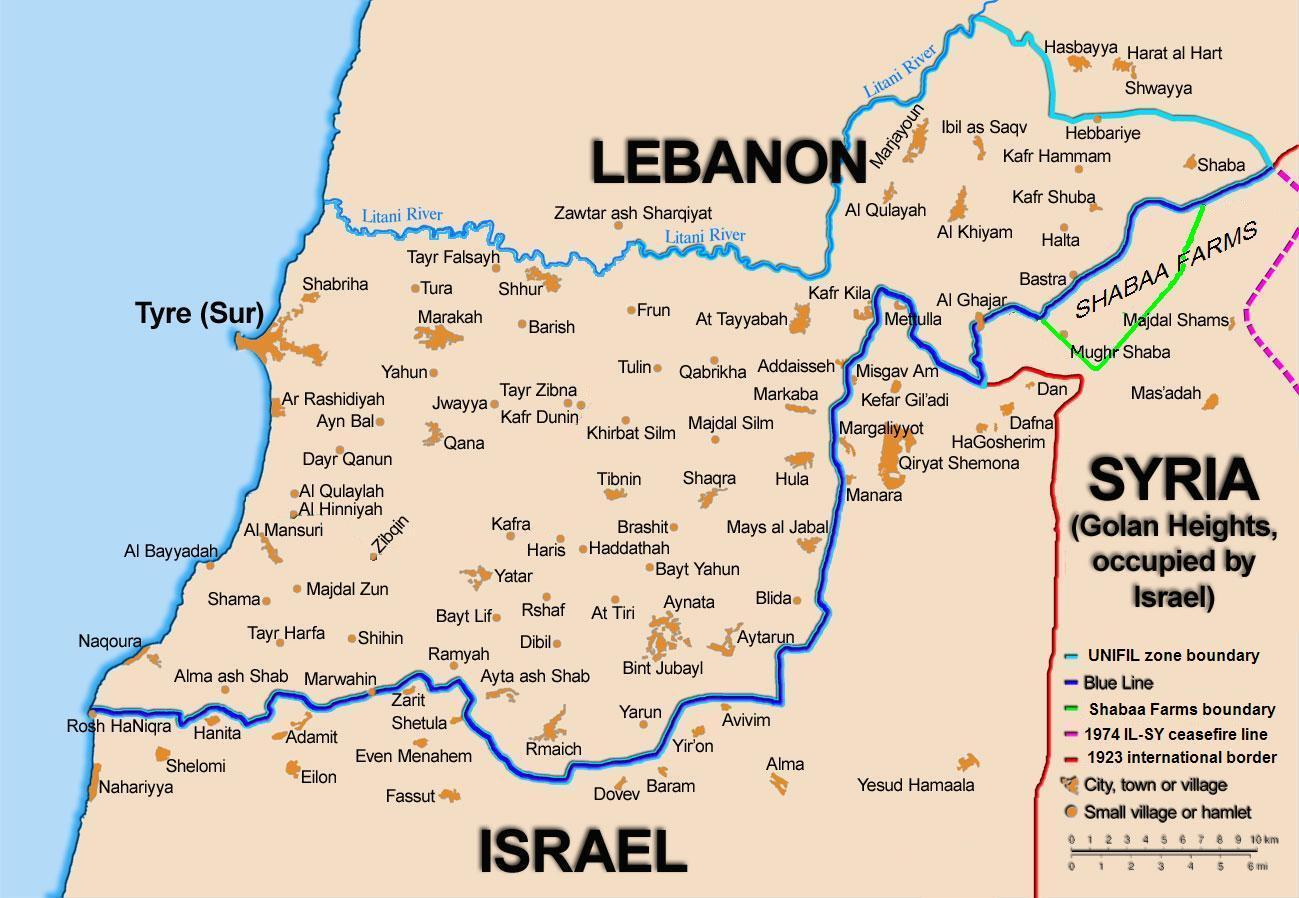
The Blue Line covers the Lebanese-Israeli border; an extension covers the Lebanese-Golan Heights border.

The UN Secretary-General concluded that, as of 16 June 2000, Israel had indeed withdrawn its forces from Lebanon, in accordance with resolution 425 (1978). The border recognized by the UN is known as the "Blue Line".

Some Lebanese parties (most notably Iranian proxy Hezbollah), however, claim that Israel is still keeping Lebanese land under its occupation, mainly in Shebaa Farms. Israel and the UN concur that Shebaa Farms is part of the Golan (annexed in Israel’s view, occupied in eyes of UN), and therefore it is not included under resolution 425.

Since the adoption of the Resolution and Israel’s withdrawal from Southern Lebanon, there have been a number of cross-border incidents.

As at August 2021, Lebanon had not extended effective control over southern Lebanon, as it had been called upon since 1978, and repeated by UN Resolution 1391 of 2002, UN Resolution 1496 of 2003 and UN Resolution 1701 after the second Lebanese War in 2006. Hezbollah has periodically attacked Israel from Lebanon. Israel has lodged multiple complaints regarding Lebanon's failure to take control of southern Lebanon.

== See also ==
- Blue Line – Israel–Lebanon border demarcated by the United Nations in 2000
- History of Lebanon
- List of United Nations Security Council Resolutions 401 to 500 (1976–1982)
- South Lebanon Army – Lebanese Christian-dominated militia (1977–2000)
- United Nations Security Council Resolution 426
