= United Nations Security Council Resolution 426 =

UN Security Council Resolution 426
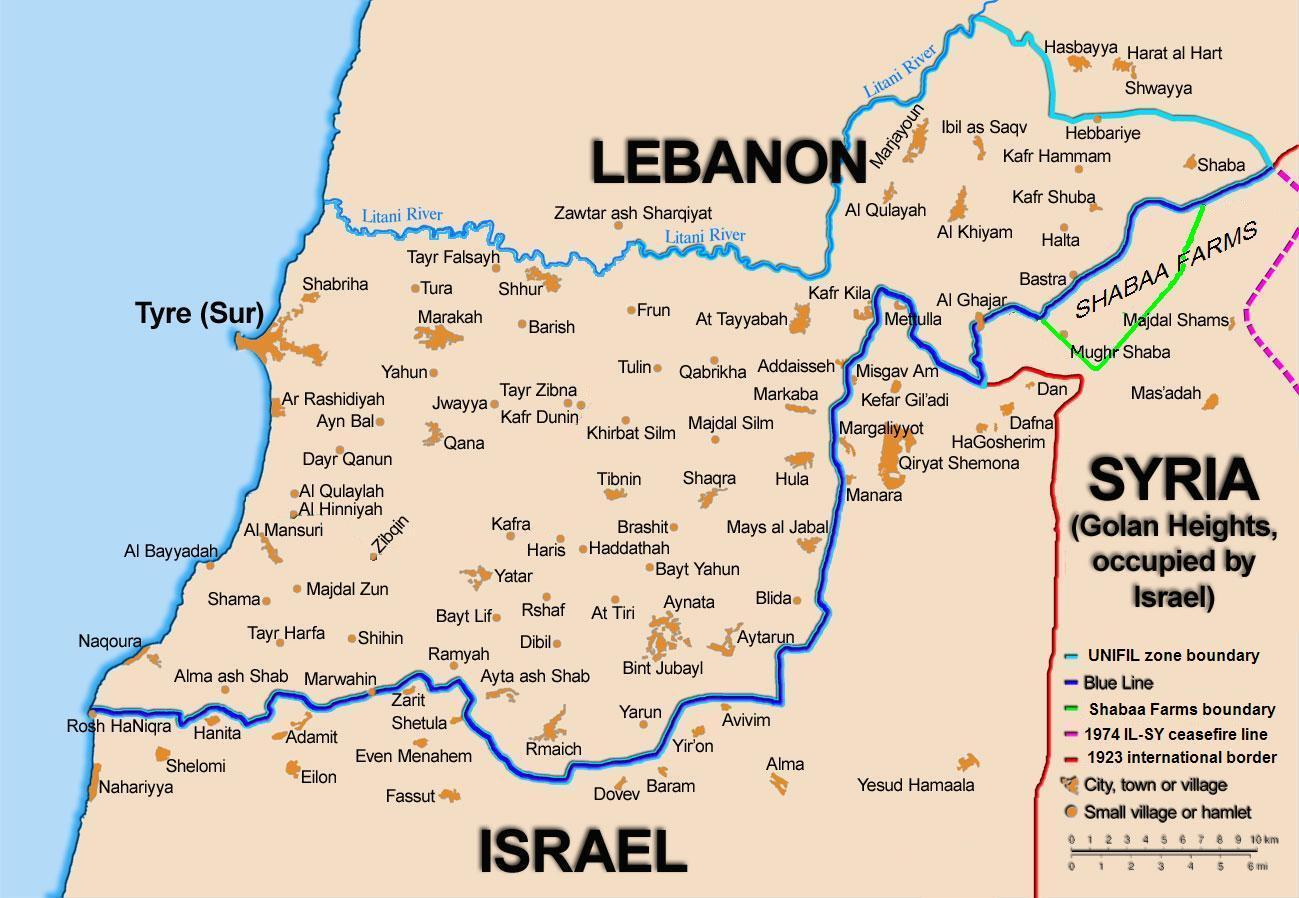
- Location of the Blue Line
- Date: 19 March 1978
- Meeting no.: 2,075
- Code: S/RES/426 (Document)
- Subject: Palestinian insurgency in South Lebanon
- Voting summary: 12 voted for; None voted against; 2 abstained
- Result: Adopted

Security Council composition
- Permanent members: China; France; Soviet Union; United Kingdom; United States
- Non-permanent members: Bolivia; Canada; Czechoslovakia; Gabon; India; Kuwait; Mauritius; Nigeria; Venezuela; West Germany

United Nations Security Council Resolution 426, adopted on 19 March 1978 at the 2075th meeting of the Security Council, is concerned with both the creation of the United Nations Interim Force in Lebanon (UNIFIL) and the duration of its mandate. It comes immediately after and complements Resolution 425, adopted during an earlier meeting on the same day.

The resolution was adopted by 12 votes to none; Czechoslovakia and the Soviet Union abstained and the People's Republic of China did not participate in voting.

== Historical and political context ==
UNSC Resolutions 425 and 426 were adopted during the first years of the Lebanese Civil War, which began in 1975.

Several militias – comprising Christian right groups along with previous members of the Lebanese army – placed themselves under the protection of the Israel Defence Forces (IDF) before coming together in 1978 to form the Free Lebanon Army (FLA), which later became the South Lebanon Army (SLA). Their common objective was to fight against the Palestine Liberation Organisation (PLO) and the leftist Lebanese who supported Palestinian refugees in South Lebanon.

On 14 March 1978, the Israel Defence Forces invaded South Lebanon, with the stated goal of stopping the cross-border attacks by Palestinian militants and the leftists who supported them. The invasion was called “Operation Litani” and the IDF received the help of the Christian militias already active in South Lebanon.

On 19 March 1978, the United Nations Security Council responded with the adoption of Resolutions 425 and 426. The former called upon Israel to withdraw immediately its forces from Lebanon, while the latter created formally the UN peacekeeping force in charge of ensuring the implementation of the decision. The United Nations Interim Force in Lebanon (UNIFIL) was created.

== The Resolution text ==
Resolution 426 (1978)

of 19 March 1978

The Security Council

1. Approves the report of the Secretary-General on the implementation of Security Council resolution 425 (1978), contained in document S/12611 of 19 March 1978;

2. Decides that the United Nations Interim Force in Lebanon shall be established in accordance with the above-mentioned report for an initial period of six months, and that it shall continue in operation thereafter, if required, provided the Security Council so decides.

== Legal status ==
A United Nations resolution is a formal text adopted by a United Nations (UN) body. Although any UN body can in theory issue resolutions, in practice most resolutions are issued by either the Security Council or the General Assembly.

There is an old debate surrounding the binding vs. recommendatory nature of UN resolutions. However, the consensus is that all decisions of the Security Council that fall under Chapter VII of the Charter of the UN are binding. This is obviously the case of UNSC Resolution 426 which deals with threats to the peace and provides for its own enforcement mechanism.

== Implementation and outcome ==
The meeting leading to the adoption of Resolution 426 was the consequence of two letters addressed to the President of the Security Council: one from the Permanent Representative of Lebanon to the UN and the other from the Permanent Representative of Israel to the UN. The Israeli letter condemned acts of terrorism launched from Southern Lebanon. The Security Council acknowledged both letters. In March 1978, after the UNSC resolution was adopted, the Israeli delegate criticized the resolution as “inadequate and hardly sufficient in that it does not condemn terrorism”. The Resolution failed to prevent the PLO and other Palestinian organisations conducting rocket attacks against Israeli territory from Lebanon.

On 3 May 1978, Resolution 427 modifies Resolution 426 by changing the number of troops initially requested for the UNIFIL from 4,000 to 6,000. It also reiterates the demand that Israel should leave South Lebanon without any further delay.

On 13 June 1978, a few months after the adoption of Resolution 426, the Israel Defence Forces withdrew from South Lebanon but UNSC Resolutions 425 and 426 were still a long way from being implemented. Instead of giving up their positions to the UNIFIL, they transferred them to Major Saad Haddad, head of the Christian South Lebanon Army in Lebanon and a man who had been working closely with Israel for years and was then regarded by Israel as a member of their forces.

During the 1990s, the UN was facing an insufficient capacity of peacekeeping operations to implement Security Council resolutions, a fact that partly explains the indefinitely protracted situation in South Lebanon. Implementation issues related to Resolution 426 illustrate the complexity of peacebuilding missions and the time they can take. Indeed, it was not before May 2000 that Israeli troops effectively left Lebanon's territory.

Despite the dispositions concerning the transitional and provisional nature of UNIFIL in Resolution 426, the Force still exists and operates in Lebanon to this day, with enhanced roles and annually renewed mandates.

== See also ==
- Palestinian insurgency in South Lebanon
- Blue Line
- History of Lebanon
- List of United Nations Security Council Resolutions 401 to 500 (1976–1982)
- United Nations Security Council Resolution 425
