= Hassan Nasrallah =

Secretary-General of Hezbollah from 1992 to 2024

Sayyid Hassan Nasrallah
- حسن نصر الله
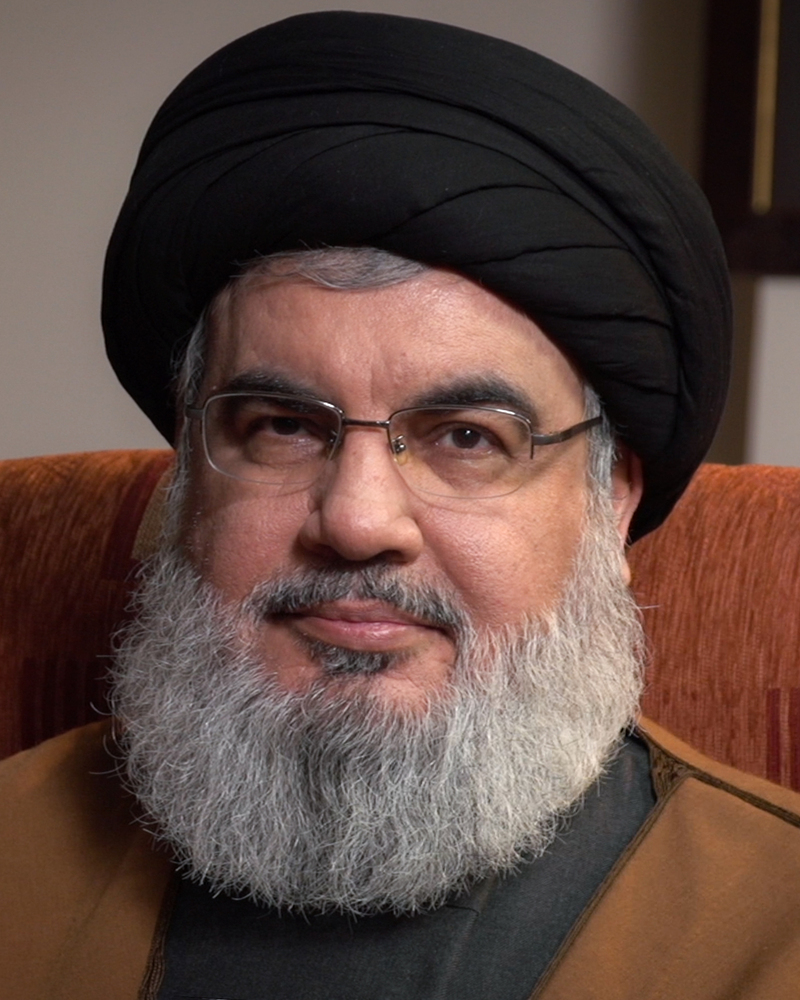
- Nasrallah in 2019

3rd Secretary-General of Hezbollah
- In office 16 February 1992 – 27 September 2024
- Deputy: Naim Qassem
- Preceded by: Abbas al-Musawi
- Succeeded by: Naim Qassem

Personal details
- Born: 31 August 1960 Bourj Hammoud, Lebanon
- Died: 27 September 2024 (aged 64) Haret Hreik, Lebanon
- Cause of death: Assassination by airstrike
- Party: Hezbollah (1982–2024)
- Other political affiliations: Amal (1978–1982)
- Spouse: Fatima Mustafa Yassine (m. 1978)
- Children: 5
- Relatives: Hashem Safieddine (cousin)
- Occupation: Shia clergy; politician

Hassan Nasrallah (Note: Arabic: حسن نصر الله, romanized: Ḥasan Naṣr-Allāh, pronounced [ˈħasan nɑsˤˈrɑl.lɑ]) (31 August 1960 – 27 September 2024) was a Lebanese Shia cleric, a militant, and politician who served as the third secretary-general of Hezbollah, a Shia Islamist political party and militia, from 1992 until his assassination in 2024.

Born into a Shia family in the suburbs of Beirut in 1960, Nasrallah finished his education in Tyre, when he briefly joined the Amal Movement, and afterward at a Shia seminary in Baalbek. He later studied and taught at an Amal school. In 1982, Nasrallah served as a founding member of Hezbollah, which was formed to fight the 1982 Israeli invasion of Lebanon, declaring that its confrontation with Israel "should only end when it has been removed from existence". After a brief period of religious studies in Iran, Nasrallah returned to Lebanon and became Hezbollah's leader after his predecessor, Abbas al-Musawi, was assassinated by an Israeli airstrike in 1992.

Under Nasrallah's leadership, Hezbollah acquired rockets with a longer range, which allowed them to strike at northern Israel. Israel withdrew its forces in 2000 after the 18-year occupation of southern Lebanon, a decision widely considered in Lebanon to have been due to Hezbollah's attacks. The date of Israeli withdrawal is celebrated as a public holiday in Lebanon. Hezbollah cultivated Nasrallah's media image as a charismatic authority, though this image was later weakened. Hezbollah's role in ambushing an Israeli border patrol unit, leading up to the 2006 Lebanon War, was subject to criticism, though Nasrallah projected the end of the war as a Lebanese and Arab victory.

During the Syrian civil war, Hezbollah fought on the side of the Bashar al-Assad's government against what Nasrallah termed "Islamist extremists" and "takfiris". However, several figures and organizations asserted that Nasrallah was responsible for massacres of Sunni Muslims. Nasrallah also promoted the "Axis of Resistance", an informal coalition of Iran-backed groups focused on opposing Israel and the United States. After the Hamas-led October 7 attacks on Israel followed by war, Hezbollah engaged in ongoing conflict that impacted both sides of the Israeli–Lebanese border, which it said was in solidarity with Palestinians. On 27 September 2024, Nasrallah was killed when the Israeli air force attacked Hezbollah's headquarters.

== Early life and education ==
Hassan Nasrallah was born the ninth of ten children into a Shia family in Bourj Hammoud, Matn District (an eastern suburb of Beirut), on 31 August 1960. His father, Abdul Karim Nasrallah, was born in Al-Bazouriyah, a village in Jabal Amel (Southern Lebanon) located near Tyre, and worked as a fruit and vegetables seller. Although his family was not particularly religious, Hassan was interested in theological studies. He attended the al-Najah school and later on, a public school in the predominantly Christian neighborhood of Sin el Fil.

In 1975, the outbreak of the Lebanese Civil War forced the family, including Nasrallah, who was 15 at the time, to move to their ancestral home in Bazourieh, where Nasrallah completed his secondary education at the public school in Tyre. There, he briefly joined the Amal Movement, a Lebanese Shia political group.

Nasrallah studied at the Shia seminary in the Beqaa Valley town of Baalbek. The school followed the teachings of Iraqi Shi'ite scholar Mohammad Baqir al-Sadr, who founded the Dawa movement in Najaf, Iraq, during the early 1960s. In 1976, at 16, Nasrallah traveled to Iraq where he was admitted into al-Sadr's seminary in Najaf. It is said that Al-Sadr recognized Nasrallah's qualities and Al-Sadr is quoted as saying "I scent in you the aroma of leadership; you are one of the Ansar [followers] of the Mahdi...". Nasrallah was expelled from Iraq, along with dozens of other Lebanese students in 1978. Al-Sadr was imprisoned, tortured, and brutally murdered. Nasrallah was forced to return to Lebanon in 1979, by that time having completed the first part of his study, as Saddam Hussein was expelling many Shias including the future Iranian supreme leader, Ruhollah Khomeini, and also Abbas Musawi.

Back in Lebanon, Nasrallah studied and taught at the school of Amal's leader Abbas al-Musawi, later being selected as Amal's political delegate in Beqaa, and making him a member of the central political office. Around the same time, in 1980, Al-Sadr was executed by Hussein.

== Early activities ==
In 1982, Nasrallah helped organize the group that would become Hezbollah, which was formed initially to repel the 1982 Israeli invasion of Lebanon. In 1989, Hassan Nasrallah traveled to Qom, Iran, where he furthered his religious studies.

Nasrallah believed that Islam holds the solution to the problems of any society, once saying, "With respect to us, briefly, Islam is not a simple religion including only prayers and praises, rather it is a divine message that was designed for humanity, and it can answer any question man might ask concerning his general and personal life. Islam is a religion designed for a society that can revolt and build a community."

In 1991, Nasrallah returned to Lebanon and the next year replaced Musawi as Hezbollah's leader after the latter was killed by an Israeli airstrike.

== Political career ==
=== Leadership of Hezbollah ===
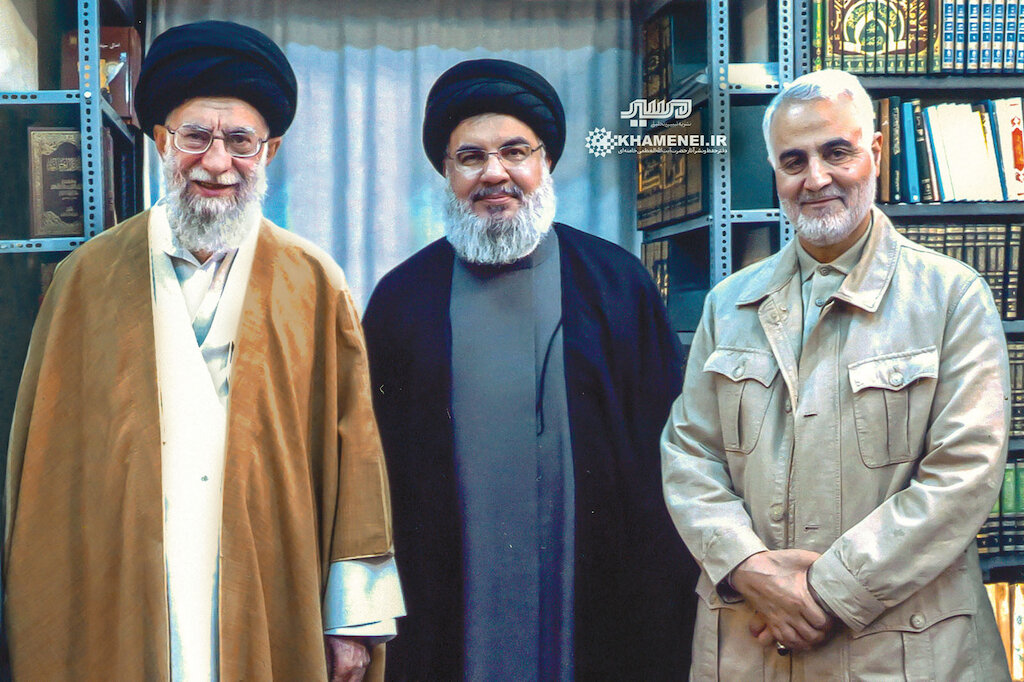
An undated photo of Nasrallah with Ali Khamenei and IRGC commander Qasem Soleimani thought to be taken in Khamenei's office in Tehran, published in 2019

Nasrallah became the leader of Hezbollah after the Israelis assassinated the previous leader, Musawi, in 1992. During Nasrallah's leadership, Hezbollah acquired rockets with a longer range, which allowed them to strike at northern Israel despite the Israeli occupation of southern Lebanon. In 1993, Israel carried out Operation Accountability which resulted in the destruction of much of Lebanon's infrastructure, and Israel claimed the operation was successful. An agreement was eventually reached whereby Israel ended its attacks in Lebanon and Hezbollah agreed to stop attacks on northern Israel.

After a short pause, hostilities resumed. In 1996 Israel launched Operation Grapes of Wrath, blocking important Lebanese harbour cities and bombing a Syrian military base. After 16 days of Israeli attacks in Lebanon, the Israeli–Lebanese Ceasefire Understanding was agreed upon. Again, Hezbollah agreed to stop rocket attacks in exchange for Israel halting its attacks. As in 1993, the peace did not last for long.

In September 1997, Nasrallah's public image changed dramatically with his speech about the news of his eldest son's killing by Israeli forces, along with his visits to other mourning families. Nasrallah's reaction became a media event that "served to bring Lebanese nationals together as a collective" and cast Nasrallah "as an extraordinarily selfless leader and an organic leader with deep roots in popular culture."

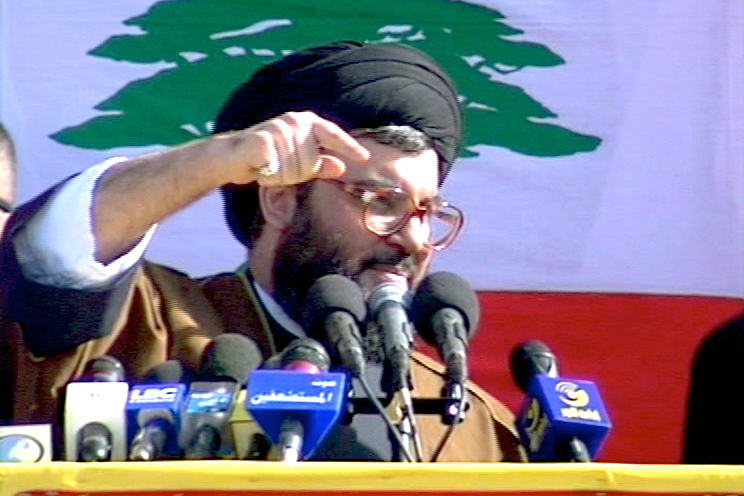
Nasrallah giving a speech in May 2000, just after the Israeli withdrawal

In Israel, it was increasingly debated whether the presence of Israeli forces in southern Lebanon was working, since it was clear that the 'security zone' could not stop Hezbollah rockets reaching into Israel. After heavy Israeli casualties in south Lebanon, some Israeli politicians argued that the conflict would only end if Israel withdrew from Lebanon. In 2000, Ehud Barak withdrew Israeli forces from Lebanon. After the Israeli withdrawal, the South Lebanon Army (SLA), which was supported by Israel, was quickly overrun by Hezbollah. Some SLA members escaped to Israel, but many were captured by Hezbollah. That success against Israel greatly increased Hezbollah's popularity within Lebanon and the Islamic world.

As a result, Nasrallah was credited in Lebanon and the Arab world for ending the Israeli occupation of the South of Lebanon, something which has greatly bolstered the party's political standing within Lebanon. Nasrallah played a major role in a complex prisoner exchange deal between Israel and Hezbollah in 2004, resulting in hundreds of Palestinian and Lebanese prisoners being freed and many human remains, including that of his son, being returned to Lebanon. The agreement was described across the Arab world as a magnificent victory for Hezbollah, and Nasrallah was personally praised for achieving these gains.

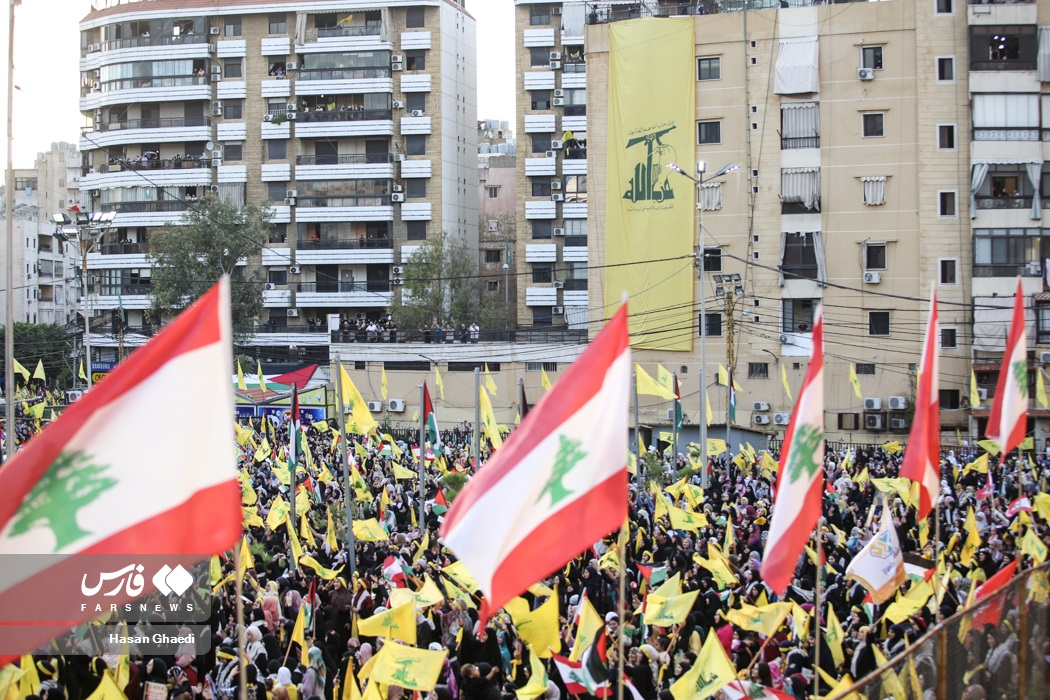
Hassan Nasrallah's speech in Beirut, November 2023

A December article in the London-based Asharq Al-Awsat said that command of the organization's military wing was transferred from Nasrallah to his deputy, Na'im Qasim in August 2007. Hezbollah denied the suggestion, declaring it an attempt to "weaken the popularity" of the movement. In October 2008, Hashem Safieddine, his cousin, was assigned to succeed Nasrallah as secretary general of Hezbollah. Widespread protests in Lebanon in October 2019 due to a deepening financial and economic crisis put pressure on the government leaders to resign, including Nasrallah himself.

Under his tenure, Hezbollah has been designated a terrorist organization, either wholly or in part, by the United States and other nations, as well as by the European Union. The Arab League designated Hezbollah a terrorist organization in 2016, but as of 2024 no longer views it as one. As of 2015, Russia was rejecting the claims that Hezbollah is a terrorist organization, and considered Hezbollah a legitimate sociopolitical organization. As of 2012, China remains neutral, and maintains contacts with Hezbollah.

=== Memorandum of Understanding with Free Patriotic Movement ===
Nasrallah negotiated a Memorandum of Understanding with the Free Patriotic Movement headed by Michel Aoun, the former premier and a Maronite Christian. Aoun described the ten-point MoU in an op-ed in The Wall Street Journal published in July 2006. Hezbollah agreed to disarm upon the return of its prisoners and the occupied Shebaa Farms. It also agreed to the pardon and return of fugitive South Lebanon Army (SLA) members.

The Free Patriotic Movement in turn agreed to work for reform of the confessional electoral system of the Parliament of Lebanon and move it in the direction of one man, one vote. Aoun made the point that the political process was in effect disarming Hezbollah without any loss in lives from unnecessary wars.

=== 2006 Lebanon War ===
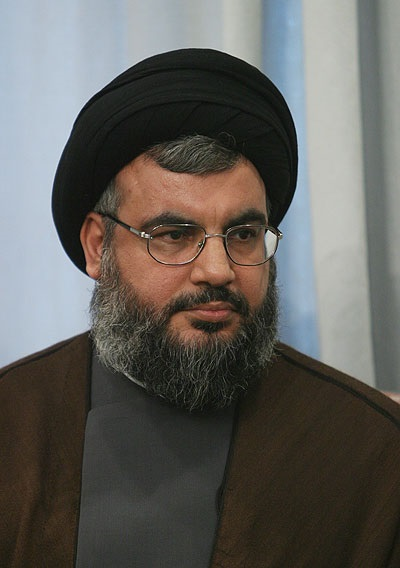
Nasrallah in 2005

Following an ambush by Hezbollah in Israeli territory that left three soldiers dead and two abducted, the 2006 Lebanon War started. During the war Israeli bombardments seeking Hezbollah targets caused damage in many parts of Beirut, especially the poorer and largely Shiite South Beirut, which is controlled by Hezbollah. On 3 August 2006, Hassan Nasrallah vowed to strike Tel Aviv in retaliation for Israel's bombardment of Lebanon's capital. "If you hit Beirut, the Islamic resistance will hit Tel Aviv and is able to do that with God's help," Nasrallah said in a televised address. He added that Hezbollah forces were inflicting heavy casualties on Israeli ground troops.

During the conflict, Nasrallah came under intense criticism from Arab countries, including Jordan, Egypt, and Saudi Arabia. Jordan's King Abdullah II and Egyptian President Hosni Mubarak warned on 14 July of the risk of "the region being dragged into adventurism that does not serve Arab interests," while the Saudi Foreign Minister Prince Saud Al-Faisal called the Hezbollah attacks "unexpected, inappropriate and irresponsible acts." He went further, saying, "These acts will pull the whole region back to years ago, and we cannot simply accept them."

Nasrallah also came under intense criticism from some in Lebanon. Walid Jumblatt, leader of the Progressive Socialist Party (PSP) and the most prominent leader of the Druze community, spoke out quite forcefully: "Great, so he's a hero. But I'd like to challenge this heroism of his. I have the right to challenge it, because my country is in flames. Besides, we did not agree". Jumblatt is also quoted as saying: "He is willing to let the Lebanese capital burn while he haggles over terms of surrender".

At the end of the 2006 war, Nasrallah's speech solidified his public image as a "charismatic leader in the media age," according to Dina Matar, a scholar of Arab media. The speech made him a "symbol of pan-Arab national heroism" and it included this appeal to the Lebanese nation:

Our victory is not the victory of the party... it is not the victory of a party or a community; rather it is a victory for Lebanon, for the real Lebanese people, and every free person in the world... Your resistance, which offered in the 2000 victory a model for liberation, offered in the year 2006 a model for steadfastness; legendary steadfastness and miraculous steadfastness. It is strong proof for all Arabs and Muslims, and all rulers, armies and peoples... The Lebanese resistance provided strong proof to all Arab and Islamic armies...

What is known as the "Green Flood" (Al-sayl al-akhdhar) came after the war, according to Iranian-born journalist Amir Taheri. "This refers to the massive amounts of U.S. dollar notes that Hezbollah is distributing among all the citizens that were effected from the war in Beirut and the south. The dollars from Iran are ferried to Beirut via Syria and distributed through networks of militants. Anyone who can prove that his home was damaged in the war receives $12,000, a tidy sum in wartorn Lebanon".

In a TV interview aired on Lebanon's New TV station on 27 August 2006, Nasrallah said that he would not have ordered the capture of two Israeli soldiers if he had known it would lead to such a war: "We do not think, even one percent, that the capture led to a war at this time and of this magnitude. I'm convinced and sure that this war was planned and that the capture of these hostages was just their excuse to start their pre-planned war, but if I had known on July 11... that the operation would lead to such a war, would I do it? I say no, absolutely not".

=== 2008 alleged assassination attempt ===
On 15 October 2008, Iraqi news source Almalaf, reported that Nasrallah had been poisoned the previous week, quoting sources in Lebanon, and that he was saved by Iranian doctors who went to Lebanon to treat him. The sources told the paper that a particularly poisonous chemical substance was used against the Shia militia leader. His medical condition was apparently critical for several days until Iranian doctors came and managed to save his life. Almalaf claimed that the sources believed it was highly likely that the poisoning was an Israeli assassination attempt.

Hezbollah denied that Nasrallah had been poisoned. Lebanese parliament member Al-Hajj Hassan, a member of Hezbollah, said: "This is a lie and a fabrication. It's true that I haven't seen Nasrallah this past week, but he's okay." The Iranian doctors arrived on Sunday at approximately 11:00 pm, apparently on a special military flight. According to Almalaf, officials considered flying Nasrallah to Iran for further treatment.

On 25 October 2008, in an interview with the Hezbollah-owned Al-Manar channel, Nasrallah denied the assassination attempt, accusing the Israelis and Americans of fabricating the story and considering it as part of the ongoing psychological war against Hezbollah that aimed to imply that the party was suffering from internal disputes and assassination plots.

Nasrallah also said that "if research was done on the internet websites posting such unfounded information, it would reveal that they are all being run from that same dark room, and that their aim is to serve American-Israeli interests." He added that at first the organization had considered denying the false information with a written message, "but when the news agencies began to publish it we decided to hold a televised interview, and here I am before you telling you I was not poisoned."

=== Syrian Civil War ===
On 25 May 2013, Nasrallah announced that Hezbollah is fighting in the Syrian civil war on the side of al-Assad government against "Islamist extremists" and "pledged that his group will not allow Syrian militants to control areas that border Lebanon". He confirmed that Hezbollah was fighting in the strategic Syrian town of Qusair on the same side as the Syrian army. In the televised address, he said, "If Syria falls in the hands of America, Israel and the takfiris, the people of our region will go into a dark period."

In July 2014, Nasrallah's nephew was killed fighting in Syria. On 27 September 2024, it was reported that his daughter, Zainab, was killed by an Israeli airstrike, however, that turned out to be false.

== Views on international politics ==
=== Approach to Israel and Anti-Semitism ===
In his anti-Israel statements, Nasrallah has called for the end of the State of Israel, and opposed reconciliation, as the only path to justice." He has also highlighted Israel's nuclear weapons as a security threat.

Despite declaring "death to Israel" and "death to America" in his public appearances, Nasrallah said in an interview to The New Yorker in 2003: "At the end of the road, no one can go to war on behalf of the Palestinians, even if that one is not in agreement with what the Palestinians agreed on." When asked in 2004 whether he was prepared to live with a two-state settlement between Israel and Palestine, he said he would not sabotage what is a "Palestinian matter", but that until such a settlement is reached, he will continue to encourage Palestinian resistance.

Lebanese writer, Amal Saad-Ghorayeb quotes Hassan Nasrallah as saying, "If we searched the entire world for a person more cowardly, despicable, weak and feeble in psyche, mind, ideology and religion, we would not find anyone like the Jew. Notice, I do not say the Israeli." Charles Glass questions the attribution of the quote to Nasrallah, noting that both the footnote in Saad-Ghorayeb's book and her original dissertation instead attribute the quote to an interview she conducted with a Hezbollah member of the Lebanese Parliament, Muhammad Fneish.

In a 1998 speech marking the Day of Ashura, and published in what was Hassan Nasrallah's official website at that time, Nasrallah referred to Israel as "the state of the grandsons of apes and pigs – the Zionist Jews" and condemned them as "the murderers of the prophets." The Committee for Accuracy in Middle East Reporting in America (CAMERA), a pro-Israel media watchdog group, MEMRI, and Shaul Shai interpret this language as broadly antisemitic. Nasrallah said in a speech delivered in Beirut and aired on Al-Manar TV on 28 September 2001: "What do the Jews want? They want security and money. Throughout history the Jews have been Allah's most cowardly and avaricious creatures. If you look all over the world, you will find no one more miserly or greedy than they are."

After the signing of the Hebron Agreement in 1998 between the Chairman of the PLO Yasser Arafat and Israel, Nasrallah called for Arafat's assassination saying Palestinian police must come out “like Khaled al-Islambuli" (the assassin of former Egyptian President Anwar Sadat) and said that Arafat’s presence on earth is a "disgrace”.

Journalist Badih Chayban in a 23 October 2002 article in The Daily Star wrote that Nasrallah said, "If they [the Jews] all gather in Israel, it will save us the trouble of going after them worldwide." Charles Glass believes that the quotation was likely a fabrication, citing other published accounts of Nasrallah's speech that had no reference to the anti-Semitic comment, and unconfirmed statements by an unnamed person who Glass said is the editor-in-chief of the Lebanese newspaper which published the quotes, that questioned both the translation and the "agenda of the translator." However, the Nasrallah speech in question is published on Hezbollah's website. Chayban shared the link with Glass, who did not correct his accusations accordingly. Glass also wrote that a Hezbollah spokeswoman, Wafa Hoteit, denied that Nasrallah made the statement. More recently, the relevant excerpt from the speech, along with Arabic transcription and English translation, have been published online.

While reading the party's new political manifesto in 2009, Nasrallah disavowed opposition to Jews, only to Israel: "Our problem with [the Israelis] is not that they are Jews, but that they are occupiers who are raping our land and holy places." Speaking on Al Quds Day on 2 August 2013, Nasrallah said that Israel "is a cancer that must be eradicated."

=== September 11 attacks ===
"What do the people who worked in those two World Trade Center towers, along with thousands of employees, women and men, have to do with war that is taking place in the Middle East?... Therefore we condemned this act—and any similar act we condemn... I said nothing about the Pentagon, meaning we remain silent. We neither favored nor opposed that act... Well, of course, the method of Osama bin Laden, and the fashion of bin Laden, we do not endorse them. And many of the operations that they have carried out, we condemned them very clearly."

=== October 7 attacks ===
While calling for the "liberation" of Jerusalem and mentioning Israel as a "Zionist existence", Nasrallah called the attacks of Hamas on Israel on 7 October 2023 a heroic operation. Nasrallah had said that Hezbollah's missile and drone attacks against northern Israel, which began immediately after 7 October, were carried out in solidarity with the Palestinians.

=== Islamist extremism ===
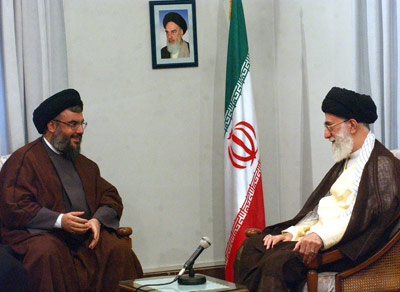
Nasrallah visiting Iranian Supreme Leader Ali Khamenei in Tehran on 1 August 2005

According to Saudi state-owned Al Arabiya, a video posted on their site is of Nasrallah giving a speech circa 1988 in which he states, "Our plan, to which we, as faithful believers, have no alternative, is to establish an Islamic state... Lebanon should not be an Islamic republic on its own, but rather, part of the Greater Islamic Republic, governed by the Master of Time [the Mahdi], and his rightful deputy, the Jurisprudent Ruler, Imam Khomeini,"

During the 2006 Jyllands-Posten Muhammad cartoons controversy, Nasrallah declared in a speech aired on Al-Manar TV and Al-Jazeera TV that: "If there had been a Muslim to carry out Imam Khomeini's fatwā against the renegade Salman Rushdie, this rabble who insult our Prophet Mohammed in Denmark, Norway and France would not have dared to do so. I am sure there are millions of Muslims who are ready to give their lives to defend our prophet's honour and we have to be ready to do anything for that."

On 24 February 2012, in a speech in Nabi Sheet for the "remembrance of the fallen martyrs Abbas al-Musawi, Ragheb Harb, and Imad Mughniyah," Hassan Nasrallah said, "I say that the American administration and the American mentality lacks nothing from Satanism. But that kind of behavior and that kind of mistreatment of holy books [referring to the Quran burning incident in Afghanistan in February 2012] and prophets, and the prophets' sanctities, and others' sanctities; this behavior is Israeli and let us say it is Jewish, between quotation marks–now they will say that this is anti-Semitism–[but] the Holy Quran told us about this people: how they attacked their prophets, and how they killed their prophets, and how they affronted their prophets, and how they affronted Jesus Christ, peace be upon him, and how they affronted Mary, peace be upon her, and how they affronted Allah's great messenger Mohammad, May God exalt and bring peace upon him and his family. This [behavior] pattern about affronting holy books, and prophets, and messengers, and sanctities; this is their mentality, and maybe they want to push things more and more toward a religious war worldwide."

=== Palestinian right of return ===
According to the pro-Israeli group CAMERA, Nasrallah said that "The Lebanese refuse to give the Palestinians residing in Lebanon Lebanese citizenship, and we refuse their resettlement in Lebanon. There is Lebanese consensus on this... we thank God that we all agree on one clear and definite result; namely, that we reject the resettlement of the Palestinians in Lebanon." There is broad consensus in Lebanon against the permanent resettlement of Palestinians, due to fears that it could reignite Lebanon's civil war. Likewise, Palestinian refugees in Lebanon consistently favor right of return over Lebanese naturalization.

== Assassination ==
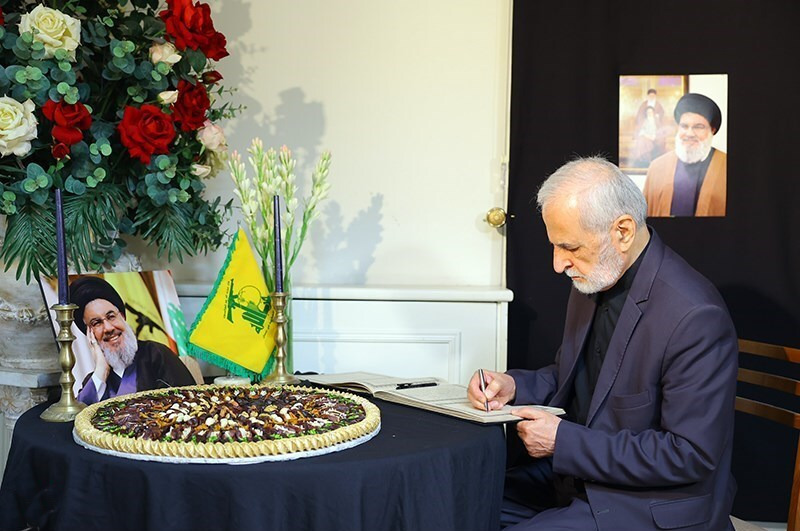
Iranian former foreign minister Kamal Kharazi paying respects to Nasrallah following his death

On the evening of 27 September 2024, the Israeli Air Force launched an airstrike on Hezbollah's headquarters in Dahieh, reportedly targeting Nasrallah. At least six people were killed and over 90 injured following the strike, with several missing. The following day, the Israel Defense Forces (IDF) stated that Nasrallah had died in the strike; Hezbollah and Lebanese authorities later confirmed his death and his body was later found under the rubble. He reportedly died from the toxic fumes he inhaled while under the rubble as he allegedly had not sustained physical wounds. Other sources suggested he had died from blunt force trauma sustained during the attack. Hashem Safieddine was assumed to be his successor but was killed by IDF airstrikes in Dahieh as well. Naim Qassem was elected secretary-general of Hezbollah on 29 October 2024. After his death, Nasrallah was temporarily buried in a secret location to avoid potential Israeli attacks on Hezbollah supporters during his funeral, which took place on 23 February 2025.

The Economist wrote in September 2024 that Nasrallah's death would "reshape" Lebanon and the Middle East in ways which "would have been unthinkable a year ago" and that the next leader of Hezbollah would face the "most precarious moment" in the organization's history owing to Israel's destruction of almost their entire leadership. The Economist felt the Lebanese public perceived the group as "humiliated" and had come to resent their domination of Lebanese politics.

=== Funeral ===
After the ceasefire and partial withdrawal of Israeli forces in Lebanon, a funeral for Nasrallah and Safieddine was held in the capital on 23 February 2025. With an estimate of 450,000 to 1,400,000 attended the funeral, which main event was held at the Camille Chamoun Sports City stadium, many of the attendees were flying the Hezbollah flag and held portraits of Nasrallah and Safieddine. Senior Hezbollah official Ali Daamoush claimed that about 800 personalities from 65 countries would attend the funeral, in addition to thousands of individuals and activists from around the world.

Representatives from Iran, Iraq and Yemen attended the funeral with Iran's Foreign Minister Abbas Araghchi described the leaders as "two heroes of the resistance" in a speech.

Hours before the funeral began at 13:00 local time, Israeli air forces launched air strikes in southern Lebanon targeting Hezbollah rocket launchers, and flew low over Beirut. Later Israel's Defence Minister Israel Katz wrote on X that Israeli planes were flying over the stadium while the funeral took place to "convey a clear message: whoever threatens to destroy Israel – that will be the end of them".

Nasrallah's body was then buried in Beirut, and Safieddine's in his hometown of Deir Qanoun an-Naher in Southern Lebanon.

== Legacy ==
=== Image ===
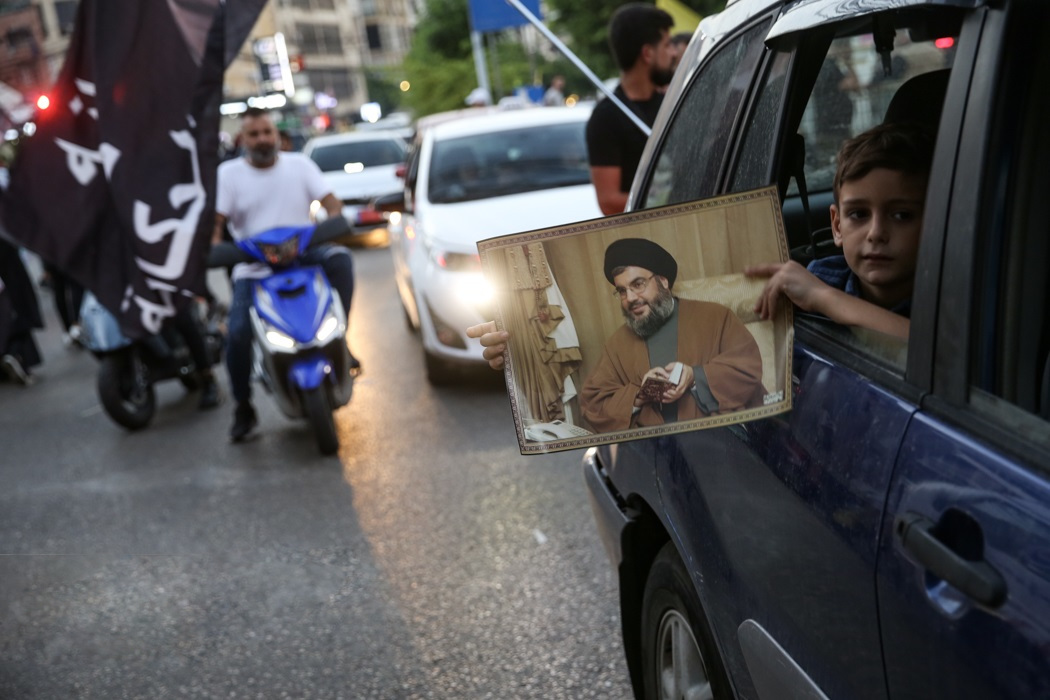
A child holding an image of Hassan Nasrallah at a parade during his speech

By playing a key part in ending the Israeli occupation, Nasrallah became a "national hero" in Lebanon. A New York Times article reported that an Arab politician called him as the "most powerful man in the Middle East" and the "only Arab leader who actually does what he says he's going to do". Al Jazeera compared him to other Arab leaders such as Yasser Arafat and Gamal Abdel Nasser, and leftist revolutionaries like Che Guevara and Fidel Castro, while journalist Annia Ciezadlo described him as an "emblem of Islam and Arab pride". Writer and analyst Amal Saad-Ghorayeb said that he is "passionate" but also "plainspoken and practical". American activist Osama Siblani praised Nasrallah as a "great leader" at a 2024 Gaza war protest rally in Dearborn, Michigan.

Nasrallah was often referred to as "al-Sayyid Hassan" (السيد حسن), the honorific "Sayyid" denoting a claim of descent from the Islamic prophet Muhammad through his grandson Husayn ibn Ali.

However, many Lebanese, especially Sunni Muslims and Christians, were not supportive of Nasrallah. He was often seen as an agent of Iranian interests in the region, as his close ties to Tehran led to perceptions that he prioritized Iranian objectives over Lebanese or Arab interests. Under Nasrallah's leadership, Hezbollah had been implicated in numerous assassinations against critics and Lebanese politicians of the March 14 Alliance, and the group has been referred to as a state within a state, serving as Iran's proxy.

Among anti-Assad Syrians, particularly those in areas held by the opposition to Assad such as Idlib, Nasrallah was often despised. Many saw him as being complicit in the atrocities committed by the Assad regime during the Syrian civil war. Following reports of Nasrallah's assassination, jubilant celebrations erupted in parts of Syria, especially among those opposed to the Assad regime.

=== In popular culture ===
Two popular songs were written about Nasrallah during the 2006 Israel–Hezbollah War, with vastly different views of the Hezbollah leader: "The Hawk of Lebanon" in the West Bank and Gaza Strip, and "Yalla Ya Nasrallah", against Nasrallah, in Israel.

In 2007, Lebanese singer Alaa Zalzali composed a tribute song entitled "Ya Nasrallah". Another popular song composed in tribute to him was by Lebanese Christian singer Julia Boutros, called "Ahebba'i", meaning "my loved ones", which was inspired by Nasrallah's words in a televised message he sent to Hezbollah fighters in southern Lebanon during the 2006 war.

== Personal life ==
Nasrallah married Fatima Mustafa Yassine in 1978. They had four sons and one daughter, namely Mohammad Hadi Hassan Nasrallah, Mohammad Jawad Hassan Nasrallah, Zeinab Hassan Nasrallah, Mohammad Ali Hassan Nasrallah, and Mohammad Mahdi Hassan Nasrallah.

On the night of 12 September 1997, four Hezbollah fighters were killed in an Israeli ambush near Mlikh. One of the dead was eighteen-year-old Muhammad Hadi, Nasrallah's eldest son. Five Lebanese soldiers and a woman were killed in a simultaneous airstrike north of the security zone. The attacks were seen as a response to the operation a week earlier in which twelve Israeli commandos were killed. Nasrallah was quoted as saying on receiving the news of his son's death: "I am proud to be the father of one of the martyrs".

When the IDF released photos of his son's body and offered to exchange it for body parts of those killed in the earlier ambush, Nasrallah responded: "Keep it. We have many more men like Hadi ready to offer themselves to the struggle". There was a seven-day mourning period held in south Beirut, which was attended by an estimated two hundred thousand people daily. His son's remains were returned to Lebanon in 2004, as part of the prisoner exchange deal between Israel and Hezbollah where Nasrallah played a major role. According to Syrian opposition media, Nasrallah was a brother-in-law of Hezbollah commander Wissam al-Tawil, who was killed in an Israeli airstrike in January 2024.

On 25 May 2024, Hezbollah media said that Nasrallah's mother, Hajja Umm Hassan, had died. Nasrallah's son-in-law Hassan Jaafar al-Qasir was killed by an Israeli strike on 2 October 2024, five days after Nasrallah's assassination.

== See also ==
- Bashar al-Assad
- Musa al-Sadr
- Ali al-Sistani
- Nabih Berri
- Mohammad Hussein Fadlallah
- Iran–Lebanon relations
- Ali Khamenei

== Sources ==
- Tucker, Spencer C.; Roberts, Priscilla (2008). The Encyclopedia of the Arab-Israeli Conflict: A Political, Social, and Military History [4 volumes]: A Political, Social, and Military History. ABC-CLIO. ISBN 978-1-85109-842-2.
- Young, Michael (2010). The Ghosts of Martyrs Square: An Eyewitness Account of Lebanon's Life Struggle. Simon and Schuster. ISBN 978-1-4391-0945-8.

Party political offices
Preceded by Abbas al-Musawi	Secretary-General of Hezbollah; 1992–2024	Succeeded by Naim Qassem
