= Subhi al-Tufayli =

First secretary-general of Hezbollah (born 1948)

- صبحي الطفيلي
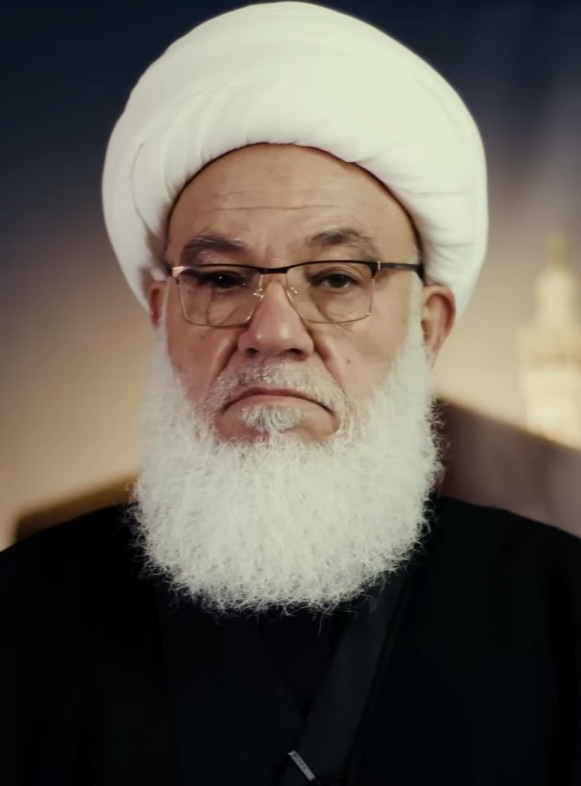
- Al-Tufayli in 2026

1st Secretary-General of Hezbollah
- In office 1989 – May 1991
- Preceded by: Position established
- Succeeded by: Abbas al-Musawi

Personal details
- Born: 1947 (age 78–79) Brital, Lebanon
- Party: Hezbollah (1982–1998)

Subhi al-Tufayli (Arabic: صبحي الطفيلي; born 1947) is a Lebanese senior Shi'ite cleric and politician who helped found Hezbollah in 1982 and served as its first secretary-general from 1989 until 1991. Early on, Tufayli was respected in the Lebanese Shi'ite community as a learned Shi'ite scholar.

Al-Tufayli is a vocal critic of Iran and the current Hezbollah leadership. Tufayli split with Hezbollah during the 1990s after the death of co-founder Abbas al-Mousawi, when the faction of Hassan Nasrallah favoured by Iran gained dominance. Tufayli claims that Hezbollah is engaging in politics rather than armed insurgency against Israel and using the Palestinians as a pawn. After violent confrontations between Tufayli's followers and Hezbollah members, he was expelled from Hezbollah in 1998.

Tufayli is against Iranian hegemony in the region.

== Early life and education ==
Al-Tufayli spent nine years studying theology in Najaf, Iraq where he met other Islamist clerics and was inspired by Lebanese cleric Musa al-Sadr. Returning to Lebanon, al-Tufayli joined with Abbas al-Musawi to help found the Shiite Islamic group of Hezbollah in the Beqaa Valley in 1982. Beqaa is one of Hezbollah's three main regions of support in Lebanon.

Tufayli attained a reputation as the most learned Shi'ite cleric in the Beqaa Valley from a comparatively young age. Viewing him as the top-ranking Shia religious cleric within its ranks, Hezbollah elected al-Tufayli as their "President of the Islamic Republic" of Ba'albek. Hezbollah militant units patrolled Beqaa valley, enforcing strict religious norms and dress-codes amongst its residents; and banned Western cultural trends.

== In Hezbollah ==
In 1984, al-Tufayli was replaced by Abbas al-Musawi as head of Hezbollah. Hezbollah's hostage-taking campaign had wound down since the "Kuwait 17" bombers of the 1983 Kuwait bombings who were linked to leading Hezbollah members were now free, and the Taif Agreement had essentially ended the Civil War in Lebanon.

After the death of Khomeini in 1989, Hezbollah saw increasing Iranian control and was made to undergo fundamental structural changes. During the first conclave of the organization in 1989, Al-Tufayli was chosen as the first secretary-general of Hezbollah, a position he held until 1991. However, the period was marked by heavy factionalism within the organization, between Tufayli's followers who pursued a more independent policy and the Nasrallah faction that toed a staunchly pro-Iranian line. Tufayli supporters got systematically sidelined and the Nasrallah faction steadily gained ascendency in the organization structures with the backing of Iranian Supreme Leader Ali Khamenei and Iranian President Rafsanjani. This culminated in the appointment of Khamenei loyalist Hassan Nasrallah as the third secretary-general of Hezbollah during its third conclave in 1993.

As flashpoint in the rivalry was Tufayli's opposition to Hezbollah's participation in 1992 general elections, which was supported by Ali Khamenei. Tufayli viewed this as a distraction from the more pressing armed struggle against "Zionist occupation of Southern Lebanon". Despite strong protests from the Tufayli faction, Hezbollah participated in elections, winning 12 seats and effectively transformed into a political party within the Lebanese system. By 1994, Tufayli had publicly admitted that he no longer any influence in the group:

"I am an ordinary militant, and I do not participate in decision-making. This has been true since the time of the legislative elections."

Al-Tufayli continued to oppose Hezbollah's participation in Lebanese national elections and its "moderation" toward the Lebanese state. He also disagreed with Hezbollah’s support of the Government crack down on drug cultivation. al-Tufayli himself however stated that the internal split in Hezbollah was caused by Iran's take over of Hezbollah from the original Lebanese leadership, and Iran's opposition to tactics under his leadership of violence against Israel and a demand to the end of the state of Israel; al Tufayli stated explicitly that Iran wanted to use Hezbollah as a "border guard" for Israel.

Al-Tufayli also promoted the cause against the corruption in South Lebanon, Beirut and the whole state, as Musa al-Sadr did, in his Movement of the 1970s. On 4 July 1997 he organised a protest demonstration in Baalbeck. Despite being banned and the army being deployed in attempt to prevent people attending, an estimated 10,000 people took part in the demonstration. The protest received support from Zahle and Dany Chamoun.

Al-Tufayli said it is "completely unacceptable that a human being could be humiliated because of poverty or because they were in need." In the autumn he organised demonstrations in sixty villages around Brital and Nabi Chit protesting neglect of rural areas and competition from imported crops. Roads were blocked with burning tyres and dumped farm produce. Around 3,000 troops were deployed and 23 protesters arrested. One of the triggers of the protest was the increase of school fees for the new academic year to $300 per child. At the time, the average annual per capita income in the Beqaa Valley was less than $500. Al-Tufayli advocated refusing to pay taxes and stopping repayment of UNDP soft loans.

== Post-Hezbollah ==
In January 1998 al-Tufayli and MP Khadr Tulays were expelled from Hezbollah. A week later, 30 January, al-Tufayli and a group of armed men took over a school in Baalbek where Hezbollah officials were meeting. There followed a two-hour shootout with the Lebanese Army which left two soldiers and three of al-Tufayli’s followers, including MP Tulays, dead. There were fifty civilian casualties, including a woman killed. Al-Tufayli and around thirty gunmen succeeded in escaping to his home village, Brital. Subsequently, his office in Beirut and radio station, “The Voice of the Resistance”, were closed down but al-Tufayli himself was not detained.

He created a breakaway group from Hezbollah with a more populist anti-corruption tone.

In February 2013, al-Tufayli berated Hezbollah for fighting on behalf of the Syrian government in the Syrian civil war. He said, "Hezbollah should not be defending the criminal regime that kills its own people and that has never fired a shot in defense of the Palestinians". al-Tufayli added: "those Hezbollah fighters who are killing children and terrorizing people and destroying houses in Syria will go to hell". He also berated the Lebanese Army for not stopping Lebanese citizens crossing the border to fight in Syria. He also claimed that ISIS was created by Iranian and Syrian Governments with help from Russia.

During the closing stages of the Battle of Aleppo in December 2016, al-Tufayli accused Syrian president Bashar al-Assad and his allies of "slaughtering thousands of Muslims", suggested they allowed the Islamic State to exist in order to undermine the Syrian opposition, and lamented what he described as a US-Russian alliance against Muslim interests.

== Views ==
In January 2007, al-Tufayli has stated that Hassan Nasrallah is implementing the agenda of the Supreme Leader of the Islamic Republic of Iran, Ali Khamenei, that the Islamic Republic's doctrine of "Rule of the Jurisprudent" (Wilayat al-Faqih) is un-Islamic and its government tyrannical. al-Tufayli claims that Hezbollah today is acting as border guards for Israel and mercenaries for Iran and the West.

Explaining his opposition to the Iranian regime and its geopolitical agenda, Tufayli states:

"[Khomeini's] successors who came after him built their politics on Persian identity... They exploited sectarianism for the benefit of their Persian project... They deceive the Shia in Lebanon, Syria, Iraq and everywhere else telling them ‘you are minorities in Sunni areas’ and this is not true."

He also has YouTube and Dailymotion accounts where he shares his views on current geopolitical events.

== See also ==
- Hezbollah
- Lebanon hostage crisis

== References and notes ==
Party political offices
Preceded by Position established	Secretary-General of Hezbollah; 1989–1991	Succeeded by Abbas al-Musawi
