= Assassination of Ehud Sadan =

1992 murder in Ankara, Turkey

- Part of the South Lebanon conflict (1985–2000)
- Location: Çankaya District, Ankara, Turkey
- Date: 7 March 1992 c. 3:00 p.m. EEST
- Target: Ehud Sadan
- Attack type: Car bombing
- Deaths: 1
- Injuries: 3
- Perpetrators: Islamic Jihad Organization and Islamic Revenge Organization (claimed responsibility); Hezbollah (suspected)
- Motive: Retaliation for the assassination of Abbas al-Musawi
- Convicted: 2

On 7 March 1992, a car bombing at a market in Ankara, Turkey, killed Ehud Sadan (Hebrew: אהוד סדן), the security chief of the city's Israeli embassy. Three others were injured in the explosion, including a 9-year-old boy. The attack, in retaliation to the assassination of Hezbollah secretary-general Abbas al-Musawi, was claimed by the Lebanese Shia militias Islamic Jihad Organization and Islamic Revenge Organization. Israel linked Hezbollah to the attack, although the group denied involvement.

== Ehud Sadan ==
Ehud Sadan was born in kibbutz Merhavia on 23 March 1955. He was enlisted in the Israel Defense Forces and served in the Combat Engineering Corps, being discharged as a lieutenant. In 1977, he joined the Israel Police as an assistant explosives officer, and later joined the criminal identification unit. He became the head of the police's Forensic Science Department. During his police service, he also attended Bar-Ilan University and graduated with a bachelor's degree in criminology and sociology. In 1990, Sadan became the security chief at the Israeli Embassy in Ankara. He had a wife and three daughters.

== Attack ==
At around 3:00 p.m. EEST on 7 March 1992, a bomb exploded Sadan's Renault sedan in Ankara's Çankaya District after he had finished shopping at a fruit and vegetable market, killing him instantly. The explosion took place in a residential area as Sadan started his engine. The bomb was either planted inside or under the vehicle. According to Turkish police, the attacker likely planted the bomb on Sadan's car while he was shopping. Police official Mustafa Aldan was quoted by Israeli Army Radio stating that Sadan "turned the key and was crushed in the car." The explosion caused a 16-inch crater under the car and scattered clothing, blood, and human remains over a large area. Debris was thrown over a 50-meter area, damaging six nearby parked cars and destroying all of the windows of three 13-story buildings. Three nearby Turkish citizens were injured, including a nine-year-old boy who was helping people park their cars in exchange for tips and a 20-year-old taxi driver. A third victim was unable to be identified due to the extent of their wounds.

The attack occurred two days after diplomatic relations were fully established between Israel and Turkey. Earlier that week, a Jewish man was injured in a grenade attack on the Neve Shalom Synagogue in Istanbul, which was blamed on Hezbollah. Sadan's assassination was the first attack on an Israeli official in Turkey since the killing of an El Al director in Istanbul in 1980, and the first killing of an Israeli embassy official since the killing of the wife of a diplomat in Cairo in 1986.

== Perpetrators ==
Immediately after the bombing, the Islamic Jihad Organization and the previously unknown Islamic Revenge Organization claimed responsibility in phone calls to several Turkish newspapers, including the Anadolu Agency and Milliyet. The Islamic Revenge Organization stated: "We have given an answer to the Israelis." Despite their claims, Haaretz reported that Israeli officials blamed the attack on Hezbollah, suspecting that it was in response to the assassination of its leader, Sheikh Abbas al-Musawi, and his family on 16 February by Israel, although the group denied involvement. Ariel Merari, an Israeli terrorism expert, said on Israeli Army Radio that pro-Iran Shiites were likely responsible for the attack.

Two Turkish citizens who were responsible for the bombing, named Farhan Osman and Nejadt Yoksal, were arrested by Turkish authorities in May 2000. They were tried beginning in August 2000 alongside 23 other Islamic extremists suspected of several murders in Turkey. The court accused them of attempting to undermine the secular Turkish government. Turkey also accused them of receiving assistance from Iran, which Iran denied. Osman and Nejadt belonged to an Islamist movement responsible for several other murders, and it was unclear if Sadan's murder was among the charges brought against them. In January 2002, an Ankara court sentenced Osman and Nejadt to death alongside a third unrelated man.

== Response ==
Sadan's body was transported to Israel on 8 March 1992, where a ceremony was held at Ben Gurion Airport. The body was then taken to Jerusalem on 9 March, where a state funeral was held. Sadan was buried in Mount Herzl.

=== Reactions ===
Barukh Binah, the spokesman for the Israeli Foreign Ministry, stated: "We express our shock and horror at this terrorist attack which took place only a very short time after a terrorist attack on the Jewish synagogue in Istanbul." Israel issued an appeal to protect Israeli personnel overseas.

Turkish premier Süleyman Demirel expressed "deep regret" over the attack in a statement to Israeli foreign minister David Levy, and vowed that Turkey's foreign minister would supervise the investigation.

== See also ==
- 1992 Buenos Aires Israeli embassy bombing, an attack on the Israeli embassy in Buenos Aires ten days later
- Assassination of Efraim Elrom
