= The Hawk of Lebanon =

Palestinian song about Hassan Nasrallah

"The Hawk of Lebanon" (Arabic: هلا يا صقر لبنان) is a popular song in the Arab world about Hezbollah leader Hassan Nasrallah. The song was written by little known Palestinian boy band Firkat al-Shamal (Band of the North) at the height of the 2006 Israel-Lebanon conflict.

The lyrics consist of constant repetition of a few simple rhymes: "Hey, you, hawk of Lebanon. Hey, you, Nasrallah. Your men are from Hezbollah and victory is yours with God's help." Lead singer and manager Alaa Abu al-Haija, 28, said he gives the audiences what they want to hear. "I see people turning toward Islam, so I have to sing to that," said Alaa.

Palestinian fever for the song brought together supporters of Hamas and Fatah who are usually divided in the Palestinian society.

== See also ==
- Yalla Ya Nasrallah, another song about Nasrallah, by an Israeli group called "Frishman and the Strikers" (also called "Frishman and the Pioneers"). However, this song has an alternate view of Hassan Nasrallah, calling him an orangutan with lice in his beard. The song also states that Nasrallah will "burn up in fire". The song was given renewed attention in 2024, following the assassination of Hassan Nasrallah.
