= Naim Qassem =

Secretary-General of Hezbollah since 2024

- نعيم قاسم
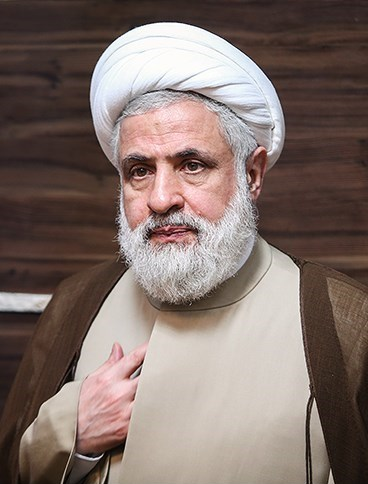
- Qassem in 2014

4th Secretary-General of Hezbollah
- Incumbent
- Assumed office 27 September 2024 (Note: Acting: 27 September – 29 October 2024)
- Deputy: Himself (Sep–Oct 2024); Vacant (Oct 2024–present)
- Preceded by: Hassan Nasrallah

1st Deputy Secretary-General of Hezbollah
- In office May 1991 – 29 October 2024
- Secretary-General: Abbas al-Musawi; Hassan Nasrallah; Himself (acting)
- Preceded by: Position established
- Succeeded by: Vacant

Personal details
- Born: Naim bin Muhammad Naim Qassem; February 1953 (age 73) Kfar Fila, Lebanon
- Party: Hezbollah (since 1982)
- Other political affiliations: Amal Movement (until 1979)
- Children: 6
- Education: Lebanese University

Naim Qassem (Note: Arabic: نعيم قاسم, romanized: Naʿīm Qāsim) (born February 1953) is a Lebanese Shia cleric and politician who is serving as the 4th secretary-general of Hezbollah since 29 October 2024. He participated in the founding of Hezbollah in 1982, and previously served as the first deputy secretary-general from 1991 to 2024.

Born in Kfar Kila, Qassem received a master's degree in chemistry from the Lebanese University in 1977. He worked as a chemistry teacher, before joining Amal, a political movement led by Musa al-Sadr. He studied theology under Mohammad Hussein Fadlallah.

Following the Iranian Revolution, he helped found Hezbollah. In 1991, he was appointed as deputy secretary-general under secretary-general Abbas al-Musawi, a role he retained under Al-Musawi's successor, Hassan Nasrallah. He led the party's electoral campaigns, and held a leading intellectual and ideological role.

Following the assassination of Hassan Nasrallah in September 2024, he was appointed acting secretary-general. A month later in October, Qassem was elected as secretary-general after Nasrallah's possible successor Hashem Safieddine was assassinated by Israeli strikes. On 7 March 2026, it was reported that Lebanese Minister of Justice is considering the option of prosecuting him.

== Early life and education ==
Qassem was born in February 1953 in Kfar Fila, into a Shiite family with origins in the town. He grew up in Beirut. He studied theology and his teacher was Mohammad Hussein Fadlallah. He received a bachelors and a master's degree in chemistry from the Lebanese University, completing his studies in 1977. He had studied the subject in French.

== Career ==
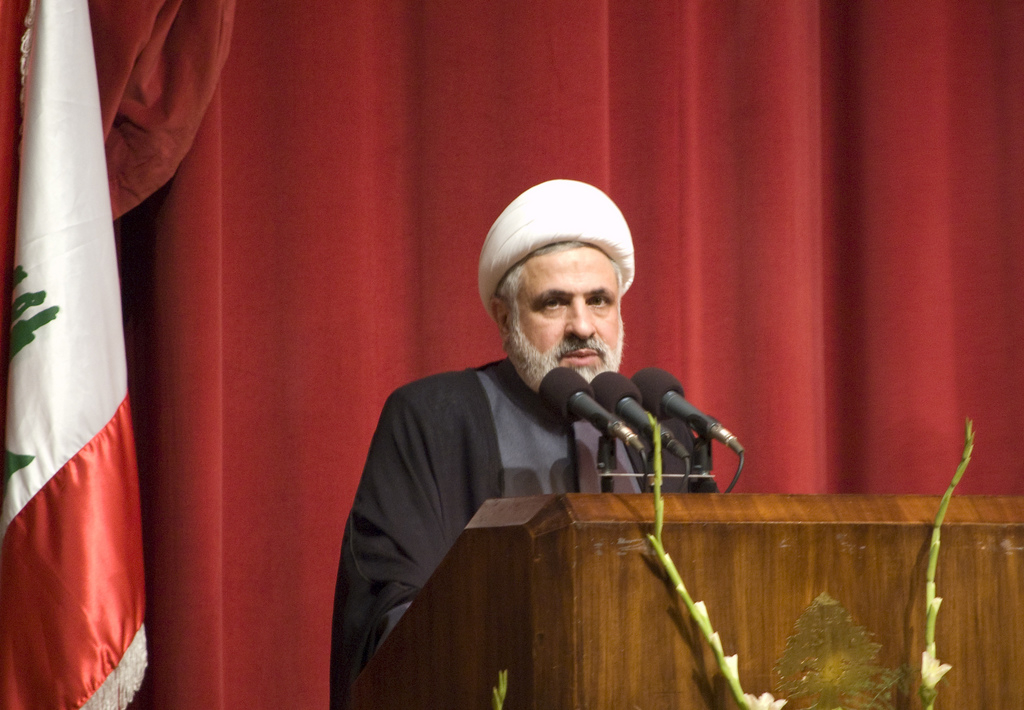
Qassem as Deputy Secretary-General of Hezbollah in 2009

Qassem began his career employed as a chemistry teacher in public schools for some six years.

Qassem was one of the founders of the Lebanese Union of Muslim Students that was established in the 1970s. He joined the Amal Movement when it was led by Musa al-Sadr, but left in 1979. Qassem was the head of the Association for Islamic Religious Education from 1974 to 1988. He also served as the advisor for al-Mustafa schools. Qassem participated in the foundational activities of Hezbollah.

In 1991, he became the deputy secretary-general of Hezbollah. Abbas al-Musawi appointed him to this role, which he retained when al-Musawi was succeeded by Hassan Nasrallah in 1992.

Qassem has handled Hezbollah's political campaigns for parliamentary elections since the 1992 Lebanese general election, which was their first time participating. In the years leading up to 2024, Qassem has "long been one of Hezbollah's leading spokesmen".

=== Secretary-General of Hezbollah ===
Following the 2024 Hezbollah headquarters strike, Qassem gave his first statement, claiming that “Hezbollah will go on with its goals and its battle,”, assuring that even after Nasrallah's death, the organization and its fighters remain strong.

Qassem was elected secretary-general of Hezbollah on 29 October 2024, following the Israeli assassination of the previous leader Hassan Nasrallah in the 2024 Hezbollah headquarters strike and his assumed successor Hashem Safieddine on 3 October.

On 7 August 2025, the Lebanese Council of Ministers approved the restriction of weapons to the exclusive possession of the state. In an appearance on 15 August, Qasim threatened that “there will be no life in Lebanon if the government tries to confront his party,” and expressed his readiness to wage a “Karbala-like battle” to challenge the decision to limit arms to the state and to disarm the defensive resistance.

On 7 March 2026, following his controversial remarks accusing the government of carrying out Israeli orders, Adel Nassar, Lebanon's Minister of Justice said he is considering taking legal action against him. On 18 March, he repeated that Hezbollah is loyal to Iran and supports it.

On 25 May 2026, the Al-Hadath news channel reported that Israel recently made two attempts to target Qassem. In a speech delivered on 4 August 2026, Qassem stated for the first time that he did not object to meeting with the new Syrian leadership.

== Works and views ==
In 2002, Qassem published a book, Hizbullah: The Story from Within, which was revised and updated four times, mostly recently in 2010. In August 2011, Qassem attended a ceremony for the eighth edition of his book, where he made the statement that "Billions of dollars have been offered to us to rebuild the deprived south Lebanon and in return to surrender our arms and stop the work of the resistance. But we told them we're not in need [of their money] and the resistance will go on regardless of the consequences."

In 2009, Mustafa Badreddine replaced Imad Mughniyeh as the head of Hezbollah's military activities. Qassem did not support the move, favoring his relative Samir Shehade.

In June 2013, he maintained that Hezbollah’s combat in Syria was 'to defend the resistance project and constitutes an integral part of the resistance against Israel, protecting our rear and the resistance's supply hub, preventing the Israeli threat from spreading to our homes, and severing links between terrorists.' He added that his party fights for no one else.

== Personal life ==
Qassem is married and has six children.

== Notes ==
Party political offices
Preceded by Hassan Nasrallah	Secretary-General of Hezbollah; 2024–present	Incumbent
