= Brital =

Brital بريتال
- Village
- Location in Lebanon
- Coordinates: 33°56′7″N 36°9′3″E
- Country: Lebanon
- Governorate: Baalbek-Hermel Governorate
- District: Baalbek District
- Elevation: 3,770 ft (1,150 m)
- Time zone: UTC+2 (EET)
  - Summer (DST): +3

Brital (Arabic: بريتال, romanized: Brītāl) is a village located in the Baalbek District of the Baalbek-Hermel Governorate in Lebanon.

== History ==
In 1838, Eli Smith noted Brital (under the name of Bereitan) as a Metawileh village in the Baalbek area.

Brital has been a well-known town for its rebellious people in the times before and after the creation of Lebanon in 1924. Due to the town's mountainous landscape, multiple revolutions against any occupation were born in Brital. The revolution against the French mandate was led by a prominent Britali and his local men (Melhem Kassem al-Masri), also Brital is the birthplace of the Amal movement and Hezbollah.

Brital is the home village of Sheikh Subhi Tufayli one of the early leaders of Hizbollah who was later expelled from the group and set up his own organisation, “the Hunger Revolution”.

Brital's municipal land boundaries span over vast areas of the Anti-Lebanon Mountains, east to Syria, south to Anjar and to Arsal in the north. Its population is made of a number of large families: Azki, Mazloum, Ismail, Saleh, Tlais, Jaafar, Masri, Affi, Ahmar, Youness and Ghadban are the main ones.

By the end of 2022, there were 4,224 Syrian refugees living in the settlement.

== Bibliography ==
- Robinson, E.; Smith, E. (1841). Biblical Researches in Palestine, Mount Sinai and Arabia Petraea: A Journal of Travels in the year 1838. Vol. 3. Boston: Crocker & Brewster.
