= 2024 Hezbollah headquarters strike =

Israeli airstrike in Beirut, Lebanon

Hezbollah headquarters strike
- Part of the September 2024 Lebanon strikes and the 2024 Lebanon war
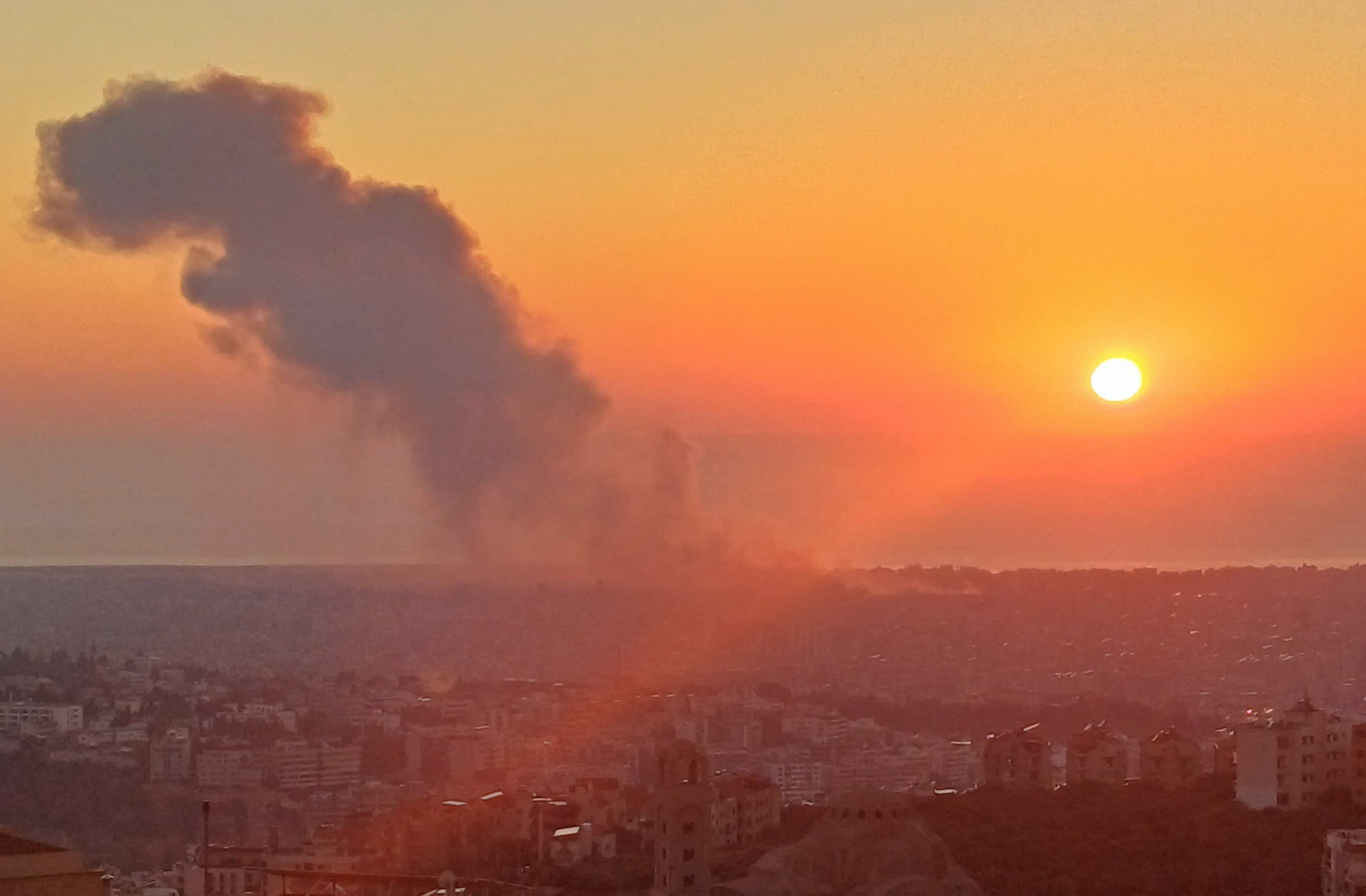
- Smoke rising from the Beirut suburbs after the airstrikes
- Type: Airstrike, targeted killing
- Location: Haret Hreik, Dahieh, Lebanon; 33°51′05″N 35°30′14″E
- Target: Hassan Nasrallah
- Date: 27 September 2024
- Executed by: Israeli Air Force
- Casualties: 33+ (including Nasrallah) killed 195+ injured
- Location within Lebanon

On 27 September 2024, Hassan Nasrallah, the secretary-general of Hezbollah, was assassinated in an Israeli airstrike in Beirut. The strike took place while Hezbollah leaders were meeting at a headquarters located 60 feet (18 m) underground beneath residential buildings in Haret Hreik in the Dahieh suburb. Conducted by the Israeli Air Force using F-15I fighters, the operation involved dropping more than 80 bombs, destroying the underground headquarters as well as nearby buildings. The Israel Defense Forces (IDF) codenamed the operation "New Order" (Hebrew: סדר חדש, romanized: Seder Hadash).

On 28 September 2024, the IDF announced Nasrallah's death; his body was recovered from the rubble the next day. The attack resulted in at least 33 fatalities and more than 195 injuries, including civilians. The fatalities included: Ali Karaki, the commander of Hezbollah's Southern Front; other senior Hezbollah commanders; and Abbas Nilforoushan, deputy commander of the Islamic Revolutionary Guard Corps (IRGC) and commander of the Quds Force in Lebanon.

Earlier in September, some of Hezbollah's most severe setbacks occurred, including the 17 and 18 September explosions of its handheld communication devices and the 20 September assassination of Ibrahim Aqil, commander of the elite Redwan Force. Between 23 September, when Israel began its airstrikes on Lebanon, and 26 September, the day before the headquarters strike, Israeli attacks had killed over 700 people, injured more than 5,000, and displaced hundreds of thousands of Lebanese civilians. On 27 September, Israeli prime minister Benjamin Netanyahu addressed the United Nations (UN), saying Israel was dedicated to peace, but would continue to pursue its ongoing campaign against Hezbollah. The headquarters strike occurred after Netanyahu concluded his speech.

Lebanese prime minister Najib Mikati condemned this and prior Israeli attacks on Lebanon, denouncing the ongoing Israeli attacks as "a war of extermination". On 27 November, a ceasefire agreement between Israel and Lebanon went into effect, although several violations have since occurred.

== Background ==
The day after Hamas's 7 October 2023 attacks on Israel, Hezbollah fired rockets at the Shebaa Farms, claiming solidarity with the "Palestinian people". This quickly escalated into regular cross-border military exchanges with Israel, impacting northern Israel, southern Lebanon and the Golan Heights. Hezbollah condemned the killing of civilians in Gaza, and said it aimed to pressure Israel by forcing it to fight on two fronts. Hezbollah offered an immediate ceasefire should a ceasefire also happen in Gaza. From 8 October 2023 to 20 September 2024, Hezbollah launched 1,900 cross border attacks, and Israel launched 8,300. The fighting killed 52 in Israel (including 27 civilians), 564 in Lebanon (including 133 civilians), and displaced entire communities in Israel and Lebanon, with significant damage to civilian infrastructure.

In July, another senior Hezbollah military leader, Fuad Shukr, was also assassinated in Beirut. On 10 September, the Israeli Defense Minister Yoav Gallant said Israel was shifting its focus from Gaza to the northern border.

On 17 and 18 September, thousands of handheld pagers and walkie-talkies exploded in a coordinated series of attacks. The explosions killed 42 people and injured at least 3,500, including many civilians. An unnamed Hezbollah official told Reuters 1,500 Hezbollah fighters were taken out of action by injuries. Despite Israel initially denying involvement with the attack, it was orchestrated by Israel's intelligence service (Mossad) and military.

In response, Hezbollah, who described the attack as a possible declaration of war by Israel, launched a rocket attack on northern Israel a few days later. On 20 September 2024, tensions further rose after Ibrahim Aqil was killed in an Israeli strike in Beirut, along with other senior commanders from the unit. After advising Lebanese citizens to evacuate, Israel began airstrikes on 23 September.

Since 23 September 2024, when Israel began its airstrikes on Lebanon, Israeli attacks have killed over 700 people, injured more than 5,000, and displaced hundreds of thousands of Lebanese civilians.

On 25 September, the United States and the European Union released a statement calling for a 21-day ceasefire. The statement was also signed by Australia, Canada, France, Germany, Italy, Japan, Saudi Arabia, the United Arab Emirates, the United Kingdom, and Qatar. US officials said that Netanyahu had agreed to this, but the next day Netanyahu denied any involvement in this plan, leaving US officials reportedly "furious". Netanyahu later backtracked, saying he shared the aims of the US proposal. According to Lebanese Foreign Minister Abdallah Bou Habib, Nasrallah had agreed to the temporary ceasefire days before the assassination.

=== Hassan Nasrallah ===
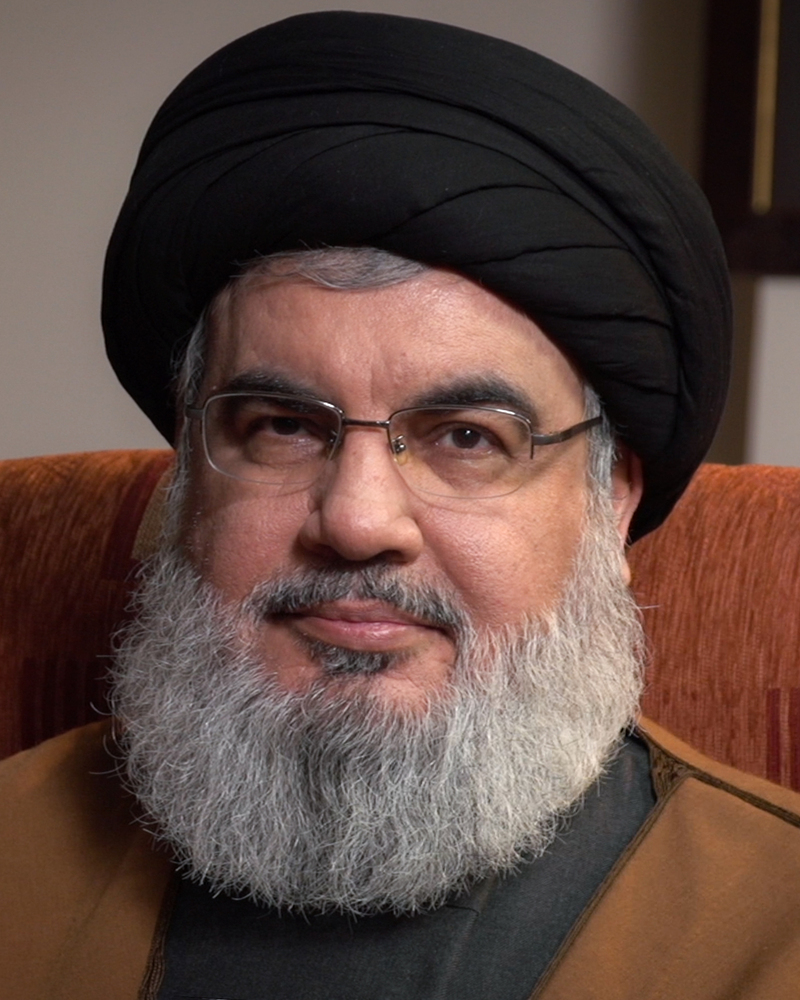
Nasrallah, pictured in 2019

Hassan Nasrallah was a political leader in the Amal Movement, but left after the 1982 Israeli invasion of Lebanon began. He joined Hezbollah shortly after it was formed, and was elected the secretary-general of Hezbollah in 1992. He immediately set out to focus Hezbollah on fighting the Israeli occupation of southern Lebanon. He led Hezbollah to fight against the 1993 and 1996 Israeli military operations, and after the Qana massacre, his popularity skyrocketed in Lebanon. His time in command transformed Hezbollah into the world's most heavily armed non-state actor, with its paramilitary wing surpassing the Lebanese Army in strength. His speeches frequently included anti-Israeli and anti-Western sentiments. Nasrallah also closely aligned with Iran, and influenced Hezbollah in other significant ways throughout his tenure.

In the 1990s, Nasrallah was popular among Lebanese Shi'ites—and to a certain extent in the Arab and Muslim worlds—but he was much disliked by the Israeli and American governments. However, Hezbollah's role in ambushing an Israeli border patrol unit leading up to the 2006 Lebanon War was subject to local and regional criticism. During the Syrian civil war, Hezbollah fought on the side of Bashar al-Assad. While Hezbollah helped Assad stay in power, Hezbollah's popularity sharply declined given that Assad had become a pariah in the Arab world.

Under his leadership, Hezbollah faced criticism for its alleged involvement in the 2005 assassination of Lebanese PM Rafic Hariri and the 2020 Beirut port explosion. He has also consistently promoted the "Axis of Resistance," a network of Iran-supported militias focused on opposing Israel and the United States. Hezbollah's popularity surged again after the start of the Israel-Hezbollah hostilities in October 2023.

In October 1992, Israel tried to assassinate Nasrallah. In May 2004, Lebanese officials said they foiled an Israeli plot to kill Nasrallah. In the 2006 war, Israel dropped many bombs on buildings that may have housed Nasrallah.

A US official told ABC News that Nasrallah and several associates were in Beirut for a brief visit during the strike. According to The New York Times, Israeli leaders had tracked Hassan Nasrallah's location for months and opted to target him a week before the assassination, believing they had a limited timeframe before he moved elsewhere. Iranian officials told Reuters that after the pager attacks, Ali Khamenei sent Abbas Nilforoushan to Nasrallah, warning him that his life was in danger and asking him to flee to Iran; Nasrallah trusted his security and inner circle and refused.

== Attack ==
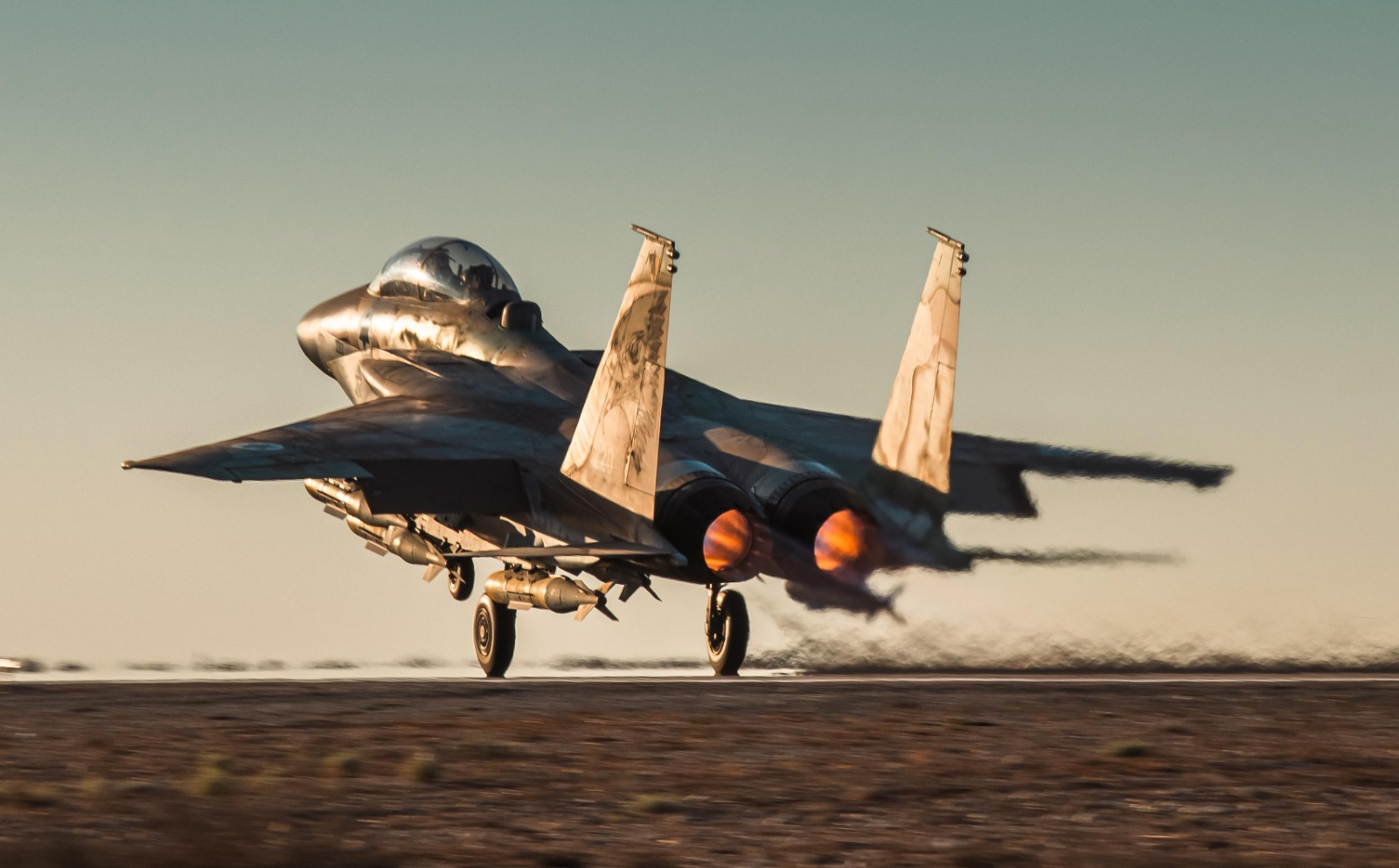
An IAF F-15I loaded with guided bombs as it is taking-off for the airstrike on 27 September 2024

External videos
- Security camera footage from the site of the attack

In the early evening of 27 September 2024, the Israeli Air Force (IAF) conducted an airstrike on Hezbollah's central headquarters located in the Haret Hreik neighborhood, in the Dahieh suburb of Beirut. Media reports confirmed that Hezbollah leader Hassan Nasrallah was the target of the airstrike. Nasrallah and other senior Hezbollah leaders were meeting in a bunker more than 60 feet (18 m) underground. According to Le Parisien, citing a Lebanese security source, an Iranian mole was responsible for informing the IDF of Nasrallah's whereabouts before the strike occurred.

The strike was either conducted by the 119th "Bat" Squadron with F-16I Sufa jet-fighters or by the 69th Squadron with F-15I Ra'ams. Two officials said that over 80 bombs were dropped within minutes during the operation, though they did not specify the bombs' weight or type. Another official stated the munition was dropped within 10 seconds and were priced at 25 million Shekels.

The strike occurred shortly after Israeli Prime Minister Benjamin Netanyahu addressed the United Nations General Assembly to say that Israel's campaign against Hezbollah would continue. The Prime Minister's Office shared a photo that it says shows Netanyahu approving the airstrike. The image reportedly features Netanyahu in his New York hotel with his military secretary and chief of staff, prior to addressing the UN.

There was no immediate information on casualties in the strike. IDF spokesperson Rear Admiral Daniel Hagari stated Hezbollah's main headquarters were the target, located beneath residential buildings. Hezbollah's Al-Manar TV reported that four buildings were reduced to rubble as a result of the explosion, which was so powerful that tremors were felt up to 30 kilometres (19 mi) north of Beirut. Ambulances were seen heading to the scene, accompanied by wailing sirens. According to the National News Agency, the raids created a belt of fire that extended from the outskirts of Bourj el-Barajneh to Haret Hreik. Footage taken shortly after the explosion revealed a large crater.

== Aftermath ==
=== Confirmation of Nasrallah's death ===
On 28 September 2024, Nasrallah's death was announced by the IDF. Hezbollah confirmed it later that day, ending the uncertainty over his condition. On 29 September 2024, Nasrallah's body was recovered with no obvious wounds; according to Reuters, two sources suggested he had died from blunt force trauma sustained during the attack.

=== Other casualties ===
The area struck by Israel is known to be densely populated. The impacted area consisted of civilian apartment buildings built over subterranean Hezbollah facilities; several structures were completely reduced to rubble and widespread destruction could be seen in the aftermath of the strike. The Lebanese health ministry reported at least 33 fatalities and 195 injuries as of 28 September, though most of the rubble has not been searched yet, and the number is almost certain to rise as dozens are missing.

Hezbollah also confirmed the death of Ali Karaki, commander of Hezbollah's Southern Front, along with other senior commanders. Abbas Nilforoushan, deputy commander of the Islamic Revolutionary Guard Corps (IRGC) and commander of the Quds Force in Lebanon, was also killed.

=== Succession ===
Immediately following the announcement of Nasrallah's death, Naim Qassem was named as the interim leader of Hezbollah. Three possible permanent successors were identified: Qassem; Ibrahim Amin al-Sayyed, head of the Political Council of Hezbollah; and Hashem Safieddine, Hezbollah's second in command, Nasrallah's cousin and also a cleric, who reportedly survived the attack on the Hezbollah headquarters.

On 29 September 2024, Al Arabiya reported that Safieddine had been named the new secretary-general of Hezbollah, which Hezbollah denied. Reuters reported that Hezbollah may have been reluctant to officially name a successor for fear he would be targeted by Israel for assassination. Four days later, Safieddine was assassinated during an Israeli airstrike in Beirut on 3 October, and Hezbollah confirmed his death on 23 October after his body was found. Qassem was then elected secretary-general of Hezbollah on 29 October 2024.

=== Funerals ===
The bodies of Nasrallah and Safieddine were secretly buried in temporary locations before their official funeral ceremonies, which were held on 23 February 2025.

== Reactions ==
=== Domestic ===
==== Hezbollah and allies ====
Hezbollah said it would continue its fight against Israel. After the announcement of Nasrallah's death, the Hezbollah-affiliated Al-Manar TV aired Quran verses. Hezbollah supporters took to the streets mourning his death and gunfire was heard. On 30 September, Hezbollah's acting leader, Naim Qassem, said the group's struggle would continue, and that it was prepared to face an Israeli ground assault.

The Amal Movement, another Shia political group in Lebanon, said that the death of Nasrallah would not weaken the resistance. It called Nasrallah a "martyr" and pledged to remain "shoulder to shoulder, heart to heart, and arm to arm" against Israel. Hezbollah's Christian ally Michel Aoun gave condolences to Nasrallah's family, saying: "Lebanon has lost an exceptional leader who led the national resistance."

==== Lebanese government ====
Lebanese caretaker Prime Minister Najib Mikati denounced the attack, calling Lebanese civilians to "stand united in the face of aggression". He declared three days of mourning in Lebanon, beginning on 30 September, with flags to fly at half-staff on public buildings.

In Beirut, Lebanese army tanks were deployed near the Burj Al Ghazal bridge to prevent clashes between Shia and Christian neighborhoods. In the eastern part of the city, where Hezbollah's political rivals hold influence, some residents reacted to Nasrallah's death with a mix of surprise and celebration.

=== Iran ===
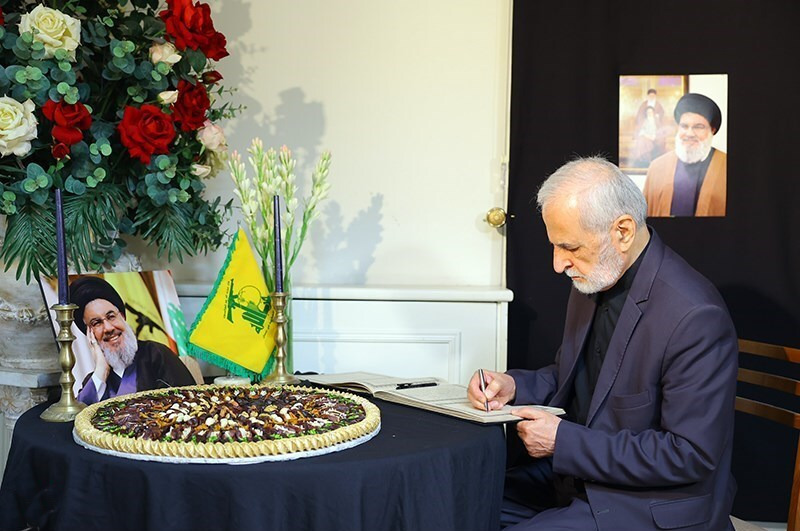
An Iranian official paying respects to Nasrallah following his death

Following the strike on 27 September, The New York Times reported that Supreme Leader Ali Khamenei convened an emergency meeting of the Supreme National Security Council at his residence. Reuters reported that Khamenei had moved to a secure location in Iran under increased security measures and that authorities were investigating senior security officials and Revolutionary Guards officers, with some arrested as suspected Mossad spies.

On 28 September, in response to the IDF's announcement of Nasrallah's assassination, Khamenei urged Muslims to support Hezbollah and the Lebanese people in confronting Israel's "wicked regime". Khamenei declared five days of mourning across the country for Nasrallah. President Masoud Pezeshkian said the attack would only "strengthen the resistance" and that the international community would not forget that the "terrorist attack" was ordered from New York, where Netanyahu was at the time of the attack. Some in Iran gathered in central locations to perform Shia mourning rituals, waving Hezbollah flags and chanting ballads.

On 29 September, the New York Times reported that Iranian officials debated how to respond to Nasrallah's death. At a high-level meeting, conservative members, including Saeed Jalili, urged a swift retaliatory strike on Israel as deterrence. President Pezeshkian reportedly cautioned against falling into a trap for a larger war. Other moderates warned that attacking Israel could lead to devastating strikes on Iran's infrastructure, given the country's struggling economy.

Iran cited the attack on Hezbollah headquarters as one of the causes of the October 2024 Iranian strikes against Israel.

=== Israel ===
IDF Chief of Staff Herzi Halevi stated, "This is not the end of our toolbox," adding that "those who threaten the citizens of the State of Israel – we will know how to reach them – in the North, in the South, and even in more distant places."

After the attack, Israel reportedly hacked Beirut airport's control tower, warning an Iranian cargo plane not to land under threat of attack. The Lebanese Transport Minister said he intervened promptly and prevented the aircraft from landing.

=== International ===
- China: The Foreign Ministry said that Israel is violating Lebanese sovereignty after the attacks.
- Cuba: President Miguel Díaz-Canel condemned the "cowardly selective murder" of Nasrallah.
- France: The Ministry for Europe and Foreign Affairs stated they were contacting the Lebanese authority to avoid further instability after the attack.
- Germany: Foreign Minister Annalena Baerbock said the attack was "highly dangerous" and risked destabilising Lebanon, adding this was "in no way in Israel's security interest".
- Iraq: Prime Minister Mohammed Shia' Al Sudani and cleric Muqtada al-Sadr declared three days of mourning across the country. Demonstrations in support of Nasrallah broke out in Basra and Karbala Governorates and in Baghdad, blocking roads to the Green Zone. The Grand Ayatollah of Iraq Ali al-Sistani condemned the killing, saying Nasrallah was important for Palestinian resistance and the fight against ISIS.
- Pakistan: In Karachi, people went to the streets to protest against the assassination of Nasrallah, culminating in clashes with the police.
- Palestine: Mahmoud Abbas, president of the Palestinian Authority offered his condolences after the attack. The Executive Committee of the Palestine Liberation Organization offered condolences for the "martyrdom of Sayyed Hassan Nasrallah and the civilian victims killed by the Israeli occupation's onslaught". Hamas issued a statement mourning Nasrallah.
- Russia: The Foreign Ministry condemned Israel's assassination, warning it could escalate violence in the Middle East, and called for an immediate halt to hostilities. Foreign Minister Sergey Lavrov said the country was concerned about the Israeli airstrike which killed Nasrallah.
- South Africa: The Foreign Ministry condemned the "extrajudicial killings" and stated its solidarity with the Lebanese authorities.
- (Ba'athist Syria) Syria: The Foreign Ministry condemned the attack. The Syrian Social Nationalist Party released a statement mourning Nasrallah. In rebel-controlled Idlib, locals celebrated Nasrallah's death for the suffering and deaths caused during the Syrian civil war.
- Turkey: Foreign Minister Hakan Fidan said Nasrallah was an important figure for Lebanon and the Middle East and will be hard to replace.
- United States: President Joe Biden said Nasrallah's death "was a measure of justice for his many victims", including thousands of civilians in the United States, Israel, and Lebanon. He reiterated the US' support for Israel against "Iranian-supported terrorist groups." Biden said the defense secretary would bolster US military forces in the Middle East to prevent a regional war, while maintaining diplomatic efforts to de-escalate the conflicts in Gaza and Lebanon. Vice President Kamala Harris expressed support for Israel's attack on Hezbollah headquarters.
- Venezuela: President Nicolás Maduro condemned the killing and called on the "Arab people to raise their voice."

=== Militant groups ===
The Yemeni Houthi movement issued statements mourning Nasrallah. A surface-to-surface ballistic missile launched from Yemen towards central Israel was shot down by the Arrow defense system.

Kata'ib Hezbollah blamed "Zionist-American aggression" for Nasrallah's death while Ashab al Kahf warned that any participants or backers of the attack were part of its "upcoming target bank."

== Analysis ==
US analysts initially believed the IDF dropped more than fifteen US-made bombs (either BLU-109s or Mark 84s weighing 2,000 pounds (910 kg) each), with a Joint Direct Attack Munition (JDAM) kit, to kill Nasrallah. However, Israel Hayom later reported that the attack was carried out using Israeli-manufactured bombs.

The Economist noted that "Nasrallah's death will reshape Lebanon, and the region, in ways that would have been unthinkable a year ago." According to the newspaper, "Whoever takes the reins will face the most precarious moment in Hezbollah's four-decade history. It is not just that Israel has wiped out almost its entire military leadership, erasing centuries of experience in a matter of two months. It is also that the group stands humiliated in front of a Lebanese public that had already come to resent Hezbollah for its heavy-handed domination of politics."

Writing in The New York Times, Farnaz Fassihi said the assassination of Nasrallah eliminated a key figure of Supreme Leader Ali Khamenei's inner circle, as Iran had spent forty years developing Hezbollah as a frontline defense against Israel. Fassihi said that Iran had, over time, activated a broader network of militant groups, including Hezbollah, to open multiple fronts against Israel, aiming to create regional chaos and pressure both the U.S. and Israel into negotiating a ceasefire with Hamas.

Writing for The Wall Street Journal, Yaroslav Trofimov reported that Israel's assaults on Hezbollah, marked by significant intelligence penetration and culminating in Nasrallah's death, highlight the group's miscalculation regarding both Israel's resilience and Iran's power. According to their analysis, "In retrospect, this was the outcome of Nasrallah’s making two strategic mistakes: grossly underestimating Israel, his foe, and overestimating the abilities of his patron, Iran, and its network of allied militant groups in the region."

In The Guardian, Peter Beaumont said the killing had raised questions about the effectiveness of Israel’s "campaign of assassinations", noting that the 1992 killing of Abbas al-Musawi, secretary general of Hezbollah, only led to the succession of Hassan Nasrallah. He said it "may take months" to see any impact from Israel's assassinations upon Hezbollah.

According to The Washington Post, the killing of Nasrallah "left a shaken Lebanon ... a void the militant group might struggle to fill, and its battle with Israel on an uncertain and possibly more violent path." In The Daily Telegraph, Adrian Blomfield stated that the assassination "may forever cripple Hezbollah, weaken Iranian influence and potentially even reshape the Middle East itself." He added that the recent strikes showed Hezbollah had been "clearly infiltrated at all levels" by Israel, and that Hezbollah and Iran "might possibly be facing a slow but terminal decline". Reuters observed that the assassination had caused a loss of trust within Iran's and Hezbollah's establishments as well as between them.

== See also ==
- 20 September 2024 Beirut attack
- Assassination of Abbas al-Musawi
- Assassination of Imad Mughniyeh
- Assassination of Saleh al-Arouri
- Assassination of Ismail Haniyeh
- Assassination of Qasem Soleimani
- Killing of Yahya Sinwar
- September 2024 Lebanon strikes
- Assassination of Ali Khamenei

== Sources ==
- Daher, Aurélie (2019). Hezbollah: Mobilization and Power. Translated by Henry W. Randolph. New York: Oxford University Press. ISBN 9780190092634. OCLC 1104064646.
