= Organization of the Oppressed on Earth =

Paramilitary group in Lebanon in the 1980s

The Organization of the Oppressed on Earth is a group that claimed responsibility for kidnappings, bombings, and executions in Lebanon in the 1980s. It was considered a precursor to, or another name for, Islamic Jihad and Hezbollah.

== Connection to Hezbollah ==
The US, Israel, and Canada consider the names "Islamic Jihad Organization", "Organization of the Oppressed on Earth" and the "Revolutionary Justice Organization" to be synonymous with Hezbollah.

Jeffrey Goldberg wrote in the New York Post:

Using various names, including the Islamic Jihad Organization and the Organization of the Oppressed on Earth, Hezbollah remained underground until 1985, when it published a manifesto condemning the West, and proclaiming, "Allah is behind us supporting and protecting us while instilling fear in the hearts of our enemies."

== Activities ==
=== Bombings ===
The group claimed responsibility for a 1985 bombing attack against the Madrid offices of British Airways and Trans World Airlines.

=== Kidnappings ===
The group kidnapped 4 Jews in 1985, including Isaac Sasson, leader of the Jewish community in Lebanon, and Dr. Ellie Hallaq, the community doctor. Sasson (Arabic: إسحق ساسون) was taken at gunpoint March 31, 1985, on his way from the Beirut International Airport, after a trip to Abu Dhabi. The group killed the abductees one-by-one.

In 1987, the group kidnapped British citizen Terry Waite who was in Lebanon as a hostage negotiator. Waite was retained in captivity for 1,763 days, the first four years of which were spent in solitary confinement. He was finally released on 18 November 1991.

In 1989, the group kidnapped and then later hung United States Lieutenant Colonel Richard Higgins. Higgins was a member of the United Nations Truce Supervisory Organization observer unit and was accused of spying by his captors. A videotape was released July 31, showing his body hanging from a gallows.
