= Assassination of Abbas al-Musawi =

1992 assassination in Lebanon

- Part of the South Lebanon conflict (1985–2000)
- Location within Lebanon
- Location: Al-Sharqiyah, Lebanon
- Date: 16 February 1992
- Target: Abbas al-Musawi
- Attack type: Airstrike
- Deaths: 8
- Injuries: 10
- Perpetrator: Israeli Air Force

On 16 February 1992, Abbas al-Musawi, the secretary-general of Hezbollah, was assassinated in an Israeli airstrike on his vehicle in southern Lebanon, as part of the South Lebanon conflict (1985–2000). Israel code-named the operation Night Time Operation (Hebrew: מבצע שעת לילה).

== Background ==
After the disappearance of Israeli Air Force officer, Ron Arad, the head of the Israeli Military Intelligence Directorate (Aman), Uri Sagi, directed that plans be developed to kidnap Musawi, a high-ranking figure in Hezbollah, to use as leverage for potential future prisoner exchange deals. The operation nicknamed "Night Time" (Hebrew: שעת לילה) was to be conducted by the Sayeret Matkal and Shayetet 13, two IDF special units.

Preparations for the operation were set to culminate on February 16, 1992. However, on the day of the planned abduction, it was discovered that Musawi was surrounded by a large crowd, making the kidnapping impractical. In response, the IDF's Intelligence Directorate recommended converting the mission into a targeted strike instead.

== Assassination ==
Before the assassination was approved, two Israeli Air Force AH-64 Apache helicopters were deployed and hovered near the border. The pilots weren't told who their target was. Meanwhile, Chief of Staff Ehud Barak spoke with Defense Minister Moshe Arens in order to convince him to approve the assassination, saying that "Israel wouldn't have another chance to take out Musawi". Arens eventually approved after some hesitation. Following his approval, the head of the Israeli Military Intelligence Directorate, Uri Sagi, and Barak, authorized the strike targeting a convoy in southern Lebanon.

Al-Musawi was traveling in a three-vehicle motorcade consisting of a Mercedes-Benz limousine carrying him and his family, and two Range Rovers carrying his armed bodyguards. He was returning to Beirut after attending a ceremony in Jibshit, Nabatieh, marking the eighth anniversary of the assassination of a Hezbollah founder. At around 4:30 p.m., Israeli Apache helicopters fired Hellfire missiles at the convoy near Al-Sharqiyah, destroying the three cars and killing al-Musawi, his wife, his five-year-old son, and four of his bodyguards. At least ten others in the convoy were injured. A Hezbollah spokesperson said that al-Musawi and his family were burned alive in their car. A helicopter carrying the dead later came under fire by an Israeli helicopter, and there were also reports that survivors attempting to leave the scene were fired at by automatic weapons. Israel later confirmed that the operation was a pre-planned targeted assassination, making it the IDF's first targeted killing.

== Response ==
Israeli Defense Minister Moshe Arens condemned Hezbollah as a "murderous, terrorist organization," and said al-Musawi was "a man with lots of blood on his hands." Hezbollah meanwhile condemned the assassination as "a vengeful, cowardly assault."

Following the assassination, Islamic Jihad Organization and other operatives have orchestrated the assassination of Ehud Sadan, the 1992 Buenos Aires Israeli embassy bombing, and the AMIA bombing in 1994. The embassy bombing resulted in the deaths of 28 people, including four employees of the Israeli Ministry of Foreign Affairs and four Jewish women. The AMIA bombing, which occurred two years later, claimed the lives of 85 individuals. An Argentine intelligence report concluded that Imad Mughniyeh, the head of Hezbollah's military wing, was a key figure in planning the AMIA bombing, alongside other Hezbollah operatives and Iranian officials.

== See also ==
- Assassination of Imad Mughniyeh
- Fuad Shukr
- Assassination of Hassan Nasrallah
