= Secretary-General of Hezbollah =

Highest position within Hezbollah

- الأمين العام لحزب الله (Arabic)
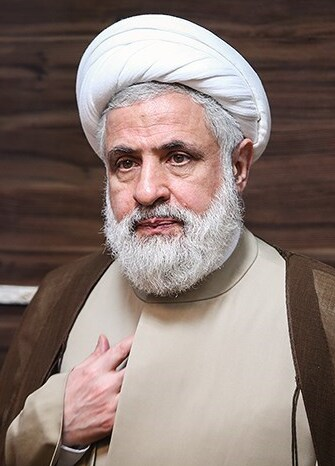
- Incumbent; Naim Qassem since 29 October 2024
- Style: His Excellency
- Status: Party leader
- Seat: Beirut, Lebanon
- Appointer: Hezbollah
- Formation: 1989; 37 years ago
- First holder: Subhi al-Tufayli
- Deputy: Deputy Secretary-General

The secretary-general of Hezbollah (Arabic: الأمين العام لحزب الله, romanized: al-’amīn al-‘ām li-Ḥizb Allāh) is the highest position within Hezbollah, a Lebanese Shia Islamist political party and paramilitary group.

The current holder of the position is Naim Qassem, who was appointed on 29 October 2024, a month after the assassination of his predecessor, Hassan Nasrallah, whom Qassem served as deputy secretary-general under.

== List of officeholders ==
No.	Portrait	Secretary-General	Took office	Left office	Time in office	Ref.
1	Subhi al-Tufayli	Subhi al-Tufayli (born 1948)	1989	May 1991	1–2 years	–
2	Abbas al-Musawi	Abbas al-Musawi (1952–1992)	May 1991	16 February 1992 X	291 days	
3	Hassan Nasrallah	Hassan Nasrallah (1960–2024)	16 February 1992	27 September 2024 X	32 years, 224 days	
4	Naim Qassem	Naim Qassem (born 1953)	29 October 2024	Incumbent	2 years, 7 days	

== Deputy Secretary-General ==
Deputy Secretary-General of Hezbollah
- نائب الأمين العام لحزب الله
- Style: His Excellency
- Status: Deputy leader
- Reports to: Secretary-General
- Seat: Beirut, Lebanon
- Appointer: Secretary-General
- Term length: At the pleasure of the secretary-general
- Formation: May 1991; 35 years ago
- First holder: Naim Qassem

The deputy secretary-general of Hezbollah (Arabic: نائب الأمين العام لحزب الله, romanised: Nayib al'amin aleamu Lihizb Allah) is the second highest position within the Lebanon's Hezbollah, after the secretary-general. The position has been vacant since 29 October 2024. The only office holder has been:

No.	Portrait	Deputy Secretary-General	Took office	Left office	Time in office	Ref.
1	Naim Qassem	Naim Qassem (born 1953)	May 1991	29 October 2024	33 years, 5 months	
Position vacant (since 29 October 2024)

== See also ==
- Axis of Resistance
- Jihad Council
