= Kfar Fila =

Kfar Fila كفرفيلا
- Municipality
- Location in Lebanon
- Coordinates: 33°28′56″N 35°29′58″E
- Grid position: 127/171 L
- Country: Lebanon
- Governorate: Nabatieh Governorate
- District: Nabatieh District
- Time zone: UTC+2 (EET)
  - Summer (DST): +3

Kfar Fila or Kfarfila (Arabic: كفرفيلا, romanized: Kfarfīlā), is a municipality in the Nabatieh Governorate, (Arabic: النبطية) al-Nabatiya, or Nabatiye southern Lebanon. It is one of the 243 towns of Nabatieh Governorate, situated at the northern region of this district, at the other side of Al-Kateh(The cutter); a shallow but wide valley, separating a group of 32 towns from the Sidon District.

Kfar Fila sits at the bottom of Iqlim al-Tuffah mountains and supervised by Jbaa, Ain Qana and Ain Bouswar, rising from sea level to over 582 meters, and away from the town of Nabatieh about 22 km, and about 60 km from the capital of Beirut, The Town's area real estate is 3,500 dunums (3.5 km^{2}). The population is about 2,500 people half residing in the town and the other half mainly works and lives in Beirut and neighborliness, the number of voters are 950 (regulations from 1998) and the number of housing units are 445 units.

== Etymology ==
Anis Freiha says in his book "The Miagam" that the name is Aramaic, which means "the elephant's village" other meaning of the name is the village of the rift or crude. The latter title perhaps due to the presence of a crack or alleged crack (called Umm Zein) in the higher east part of the town (called Hawara) resulting from an old earthquake according to the elderly parents, which caused a permanent spring giving life to most of the town's agricultural and named Ibn al-Aqil.

== History ==
There are many caves in the town that date back to the Phoenician era and most of them are cemetery types the first one is located in a place called "Al-srag" and falls northwest of the town and the other three are found to the east of the town including one that has three internal holes and each has two graves inside). In the south part of the town there is a longsheng pottery, colored glass cups and there is a number of mills, one of them still stands (Kfar Fila river) one of the Zahrani river streams.

== Demographics ==
In 2014 Muslims made up 99.28% of registered voters in Kfar Fila. 96.49% of the voters were Shia Muslims.

== Schools ==
There is an old mosque in the town said that it was a religious school in the early 20th century and was sponsored by scholars of a religion, but the school did not last long, then in the early 1950s it was re-used as the official school of the town, Before the 1950 period the education to the sons of the town families of Reading in the 1930s and 1940s was attended by Ali Abdul-Mageed Ousairan, Sheikh Mohiuddin Elhur, Abdul Ghani Fakih, Sheikh Salman Taki and then Sheikh Mohamed Taki. The official beginning of the school year to the reintroduction in 1944 with a single teacher Moussa Hussein Hammoud, from the town of Kfarmilky followed in the early 1950s Sheikh Aref Elhour. In the early 1960s, presented to the school by teachers Jameel Jizzini, Wafiq Kassem, Muqallad Muqalled, Tawfiq Elhour, Saleh Al-Khayyat, and completed the primary 1970 mm and is now the director Professor Hani Muhammad Elhour and then his successor Professor Ibrahim Fayyad for the year 1987. The current director is Professor nazih Khavaja with the knowledge that the school is the only elementary, There is also a branch of the Al Mahdi private schools as of the year 1997.

== Landmarks ==
The most famous landmark is the many caves in the town which date back to the Phoenicians' time and were built northwest of the town.

== Economy ==
=== Onions ===
The town is known for the cultivation of different kind of onions and foremost the white fancy kind which has been a must for the people of the various areas of the whole country as far as Tyre, Zahlé, Tripoli, Sidon and Nabatieh. The annual production is more than twenty eight tons.

=== Olives ===
Although the mountainous profile of this town is harsh, the cultivation of olive trees is common, with high quality of olive oil, extracted with the traditional Koranian cold technique, Kfar Fila is also popular with its fruits as it is known to most locals as the large garden of fruit trees. As the homes rimmed with gardens and trees spread to its own shops, and miscellaneous Dakkakin on both sides of the main road to the town (saha).
