= Ariel Merari =

Israeli professor (born 1939)

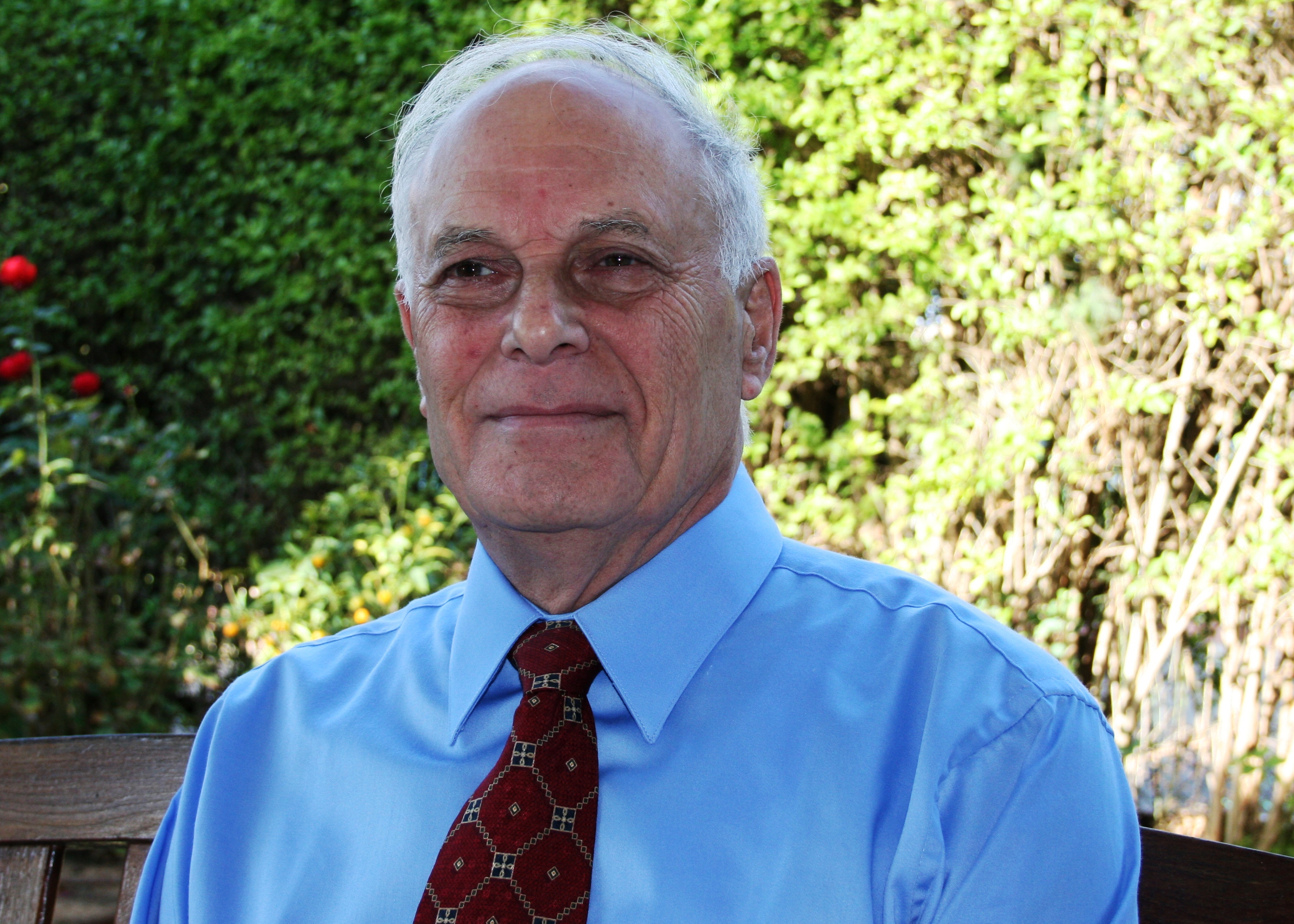
Ariel Merari in 2009

Ariel Merari (Hebrew: אריאל מררי; born 1939) is a retired Israeli professor and terrorism expert.

== Biography ==
He received a B.A. degree in psychology and in economics from Hebrew University in Jerusalem, and a Ph.D. in psychology from University of California, Berkeley. He taught at Tel Aviv University from 1975 to 2006.

On 1 December 1989, he appeared on the celebrated British television programme After Dark to discuss terrorism, alongside Fred Holroyd, Richard Clutterbuck, Jillian Becker, Gordon Liddy, Yehudi Menuhin and others.

== Books ==
- Elad, S. and Merari, A. The Soviet Bloc and World Terrorism. Tel Aviv University: The Jaffee Center for Strategic Studies Paper No. 26, 1984 (81 pp.). Also published in Hebrew in: J. Alpher (ed.) Strategic Annual 1986. Tel Aviv: Hakibutz Hameukhad, 1986, pp. 154–213.
- Merari, A. and Elad, S. The International Dimension of Palestinian Terrorism . Boulder, Colorado: Westview Press, 1987 (147 pp.)
- Published in Hebrew by: Ariel Merari, Shlomi Elad. Abroad: Foreign Palestinian Terrorism 1986-1968. Bnei Brak: United Kibbutz Publishers, 1986.
- Merari, A. Driven to Death: Psychological and Social Aspects of Suicide Terrorism. New York: Oxford University Press, 2010 (315 pp.).
- Merari, A. (Ed.). On Terrorism and Combating Terrorism. Frederick, Maryland: University Publications of America, 1985.
