= Islamic Jihad Organization =

1983–1992 Lebanese Shia militia

- Leader: Imad Mughniyeh
- Dates active: Early 1983–1992
- Merged into: Hezbollah
- Headquarters: Beirut and Baalbek
- Ideology: Pan-Islamism; Shia Islamism; Khomeinism; Jihadism; Anti-Zionism
- Part of: Hezbollah (from 1985)
- Wars: Lebanese Civil War

The Islamic Jihad Organization (IJO; French: Organisation du Jihad Islamique (OJI); Arabic: حركة الجهاد الإسلامي, romanized: Ḥarakat al-Jihād al-'Islāmiyy, lit. 'Islamic Jihad Movement') was a Shia Lebanese militia known for its activities in the 1980s during the Lebanese Civil War.

The organization, advocating for the withdrawal of all Americans from Lebanon, claimed responsibility for a number of kidnappings, assassinations, and bombings of embassies and peacekeeping troops which killed several hundred people. Their deadliest attacks were in 1983, when they carried out the bombing of the barracks of French and U.S. MNF peacekeeping troops, and that of the United States embassy in Beirut.

Adam Shatz described Islamic Jihad as "a precursor to Hezbollah, which did not yet officially exist" at the time of the bombing it took credit for.

== Origins ==
Possibly formed in early 1983 and reportedly led by Imad Mughniyah, a former Lebanese Shi'ite member of Palestinian Fatah's Force 17, the IJO was not a militia but rather a typical underground urban guerrilla organization. Based at Baalbek in the Beqaa valley, the group aligned 200 Lebanese Shi'ite militants financed by Iran and trained by the Iranian Revolutionary Guards' contingent previously sent by Ayatollah Khomeini to fight the June 1982 Israeli invasion of Lebanon. However, senior Iranian officials denied the alleged connections. For instance, Mehdi Karroubi claimed that Iran had not been related to the group.

== Existence ==
Initially the group was described as "a mysterious group about which virtually nothing was known," one whose "only members" seemed to be the "anonymous callers" taking credit for the bombings, or one that simply didn't exist. After the MNF bombing, The New York Times reported that "Lebanese police sources, Western intelligence sources, Israeli Government sources and leading Shi'ite Muslim religious leaders in Beirut are all convinced that there is no such thing as Islamic Jihad," as an organization, no membership, no writings, etc.

Lebanese journalist Hala Jaber compared it to "a phony company which rents office space for a month and then vanishes," existing "only when it was committing an atrocity against its targets ..." Journalist Robin Wright has described it as "more of an information network for a variety of cells of movements", rather than a centralized organization. Not all of IJ's claims of responsibility were credible, as "in some cases, the callers seemed to be exploiting the activities of groups that had no apparent ties to Islamic Jihad," while working with some success to create "an aura of a single omnipotent force in the region." Wright has compared Islamic Jihad to the Black September wing of the Palestinian Fatah, serving the function of providing its controlling organization, in this case Hezbollah, with some distance and plausible deniability from acts that might provoke retaliation or other problems.

Adam Shatz of The Nation magazine has described Islamic Jihad as "a precursor to Hezbollah, which did not yet officially exist" at the time of the bombings Islamic Jihad took credit for. Jeffrey Goldberg states "Using various names, including the Islamic Jihad Organization and the Organization of the Oppressed on Earth, Hezbollah remained underground until 1985, when it published a manifesto condemning the West, and proclaiming, '.... Allah is behind us supporting and protecting us while instilling fear in the hearts of our enemies.'"

According to investigative journalist Ronen Bergman, "Islamic Jihad" was one of many aliases used by Hezbollah. A 2003 decision by an American court named Islamic Jihad as the name used by Hezbollah for its attacks in Lebanon, and parts of the Middle East, and Europe. Hezbollah itself uses the name "Islamic Resistance" (al-Muqawama al-Islamiyya) in its attacks against Israel.

According to Marius Deeb, by the mid-1980s Hezbollah leaders are reported to have admitted their involvement in the attacks and the nominal nature of "Islamic Jihad", that it was merely a "telephone organisation," and whose name was "used by those involved to disguise their true identity."

Former CIA operative and author Robert Baer describes it as the cover name used by the Iranian Islamic Revolutionary Guard Corps (IRGC). Baer claims the order for 1983 US embassy bombing is widely believed to have originated high up in the Iranian leadership hierarchy. According to Baer it is "a very distinct organization, which was separate from Hezbollah because you had the [Hezbollah] consultative council which only had a vague idea of what the hostage-takers were doing."

Hala Jaber calls it a name "deliberately contrived by the Iranian Revolutionary Guards and their recruits to cast confusion." However, Wright is more circumspect saying: "Islamic Jihad was clearly pro-Iranian in ideology, but some doubts existed among both Muslim moderates and Western diplomats about whether it was actually directed by Iran rather than home-grown."

More recently authors such as researcher Robert A. Pape and journalist Lawrence Wright have made no mention of Islamic Jihad and simply name Hezbollah as the author of Lebanese terror attacks claimed or attributed to Islamic Jihad: "From 1982 to 1986, Hezbollah conducted 36 suicide terrorist attacks involving a total of 41 attackers against American, French, and Israeli political and military targets in Lebanon ... Altogether, these attacks killed 659 people ..."

== Actions ==
=== Bombings and assassinations ===
- 24 May 1982. Car bomb attack on French Embassy in Beirut killing 12 and wounding 27. Islamic Jihad is one of several groups taking responsibility. Anger over France's providing of arms to Iran's enemy Iraq is thought to be the motivating factor.
- 18 April 1983. Bombing of U.S. Embassy in Beirut. Detonated in a delivery van driven by a suicide bomber, carrying about 2000 pounds of explosives. The bomb killed 63 people, 17 of them Americans, including 9 CIA agents in Beirut for a meeting.
- 23 October 1983. MNF barracks bombing in Beirut. Two truck bombs struck buildings in Beirut housing U.S. and French members of the Multinational Force in Lebanon, killing 241 American servicemen and 58 French paratroopers. Islamic Jihad claims responsibility in a statement to Agence France Presse: "We are the soldiers of God, ... We are neither Iranians, Syrian nor Palestinians, but Muslims who follow the precepts of the Koran ... We said after that [April embassy bombing] that we would strike more violently still. Now they understand with what they are dealing. Violence will remain our only way."
- 12 December 1983. 1983 Kuwait bombings. Two months after the Beirut barracks bombing. The 90-minute coordinated attack of six key foreign and Kuwaiti installations including two embassies, the airport and the country's main petro-chemical plant, was more notable for the damage it might have caused than what was actually destroyed. What might have been "the worst terrorist episode of the twentieth century in the Middle East," succeeding in killing only six people because of the bombs faulty rigging.
- 18 January 1984. Malcolm H. Kerr, president of the American University in Beirut (AUB), was assassinated near his office. He had replaced AUB president David Dodge, who was kidnapped six months earlier. A telephone message claiming to represent Islamic Jihad proclaimed: "We are responsible of the assassination of the president of AUB ... We also vow that not a single American or French will remain on this soil. We shall take no different course. And we shall not waver."
- 7 February 1984. Gholam Ali Oveisi, former military governor of Tehran, and his brother were assassinated in Paris where they were in exile. An anonymous person called and told the UPI in London that the group perpetrated the assassination, stating "...we shall do this wherever our opposition is abroad."
- 20 September 1984. 1984 U.S. embassy annex bombing. In Christian East Beirut the US embassy was bombed by a suicide van bomber with 3000 pounds of explosives. 14 were killed, including two Americans, and dozens were injured. They had moved to a "quiet residential suburb of hillside villas and luxury apartments" after the 1983 bombing. Ambassador Reginald Bartholomew and visiting British Ambassador David Miers were buried under rubble but rescued with only minor injuries. Islamic Jihad took credit in an anonymous phone call vowing, "The operation comes to prove that we will carry out our previous promise not to allow a single American to remain on Lebanese soil. ... we mean every inch of Lebanese territory. ..."
- 12 April 1985. 1985 El Descanso bombing. The IJO claims a bombing of a Spanish restaurant aimed at American military personnel. The bomb killed 18 Spaniards and injured 82 others, including 11 American servicemen.
- 25 May 1985. Attempted assassination of Kuwaiti ruler (Emir) Sheikh Jaber Al-Ahmad Al-Jaber Al-Sabah, by suicide car bomber attack of the Emir's motorcade. Two bodyguards and a passerby are killed. Islamic Jihad claimed responsibility and again demands the terrorists release.
- 22 July 1985. 1985 Copenhagen bombings. Two bombs exploded in a terrorist attack in Copenhagen, Denmark. One of the bombs exploded near the Great Synagogue and a Jewish nursing home and kindergarten, and another at the offices of Northwest Orient Airlines.
- 7 March 1992. Assassination of Ehud Sadan. A booby-trapped car exploded in Ankara, Turkey, killing Ehud Sadan, the security chief of the Israeli embassy, and wounding three bystanders. Islamic Jihad claimed responsibility alongside the previously-unknown Islamic Revenge Organization.
- 17 March 1992. 1992 Israeli Embassy attack in Buenos Aires. A suicide truck bomber smashes into the front of the Israeli Embassy destroying the embassy, a Catholic church, and a nearby school building. 29 are killed and 242 wounded, mostly Argentinian civilians, many of them children. As of 2006 it remains the deadliest attack on an Israeli diplomatic mission. Islamic Jihad, claims responsibility, stating the attack was in retaliation for Israel's assassination of Hezbollah leader Sayed Abbas al-Musawi.

=== Unverified claims ===
- 12 December 1985. Arrow Air Flight 1285 taking off from Gander, Newfoundland, crashes and burns about half a mile from the runway, killing all 256 passengers and crew on board. An anonymous caller to a French news agency in Beirut claimed that Islamic Jihad destroyed the plane to prove "our ability to strike at the Americans anywhere." An investigation by the Canadian Aviation Safety Board (CASB) found that the crash was most likely an accident. However, the minority report speculated that the in-flight fire "may have resulted from detonations of undetermined origin".

=== Kidnappings ===
- 16 March 1984. William Francis Buckley, Central Intelligence Agency (CIA) Beirut chief of station, was abducted on this date. Islamic Jihad claims to have killed him on 3 October 1985, and later released to a Beirut newspaper a photograph purporting to depict his corpse. Press reports stated that Buckley had been transferred to Iran, where he was tortured and killed.
- May 1984. Presbyterian minister Benjamin Weir is kidnapped by three armed men. Weir may have thought he was safe from harm from Muslims because he had lived in Lebanon since 1958. He lived in Shiite West Beirut working "closely with various Muslim-oriented charity and relief groups". Two days after his abduction, a telephone message allegedly from Islamic Jihad, claiming responsibility for the abduction "in order to renew our acceptance of Reagan's challenge and to confirm our commitment of the statement ... that we will not leave any American on Lebanese soil." Weir was freed sixteen months later.
- 10 February 1986. Islamic Jihad released a photograph that claimed to show the (dead) body of French citizen Michel Seurat, who had been kidnapped earlier.
- In January 1987, Terry Waite traveled to Beirut with the intention of negotiating with Islamic Jihad to release hostages. The group violated an agreement of safe passage and kidnapped him. He was kept as a hostage until 1991.

== Decline and demise, 1986–1992 ==
The IJO suffered a setback in 1986 when their temporary abduction of four Soviet diplomats carried out previously in September 1985 ended up in the assassination of one hostage. The KGB promptly retaliated with intimidation and by pressuring Syria to stop its operations in northern Lebanon in exchange for release of the remaining three hostages. This fiasco, coupled by the pressure resulting from tighter security measures and joint anti-militia sweeps implemented by the Syrian Army, the Lebanese Internal Security Forces (ISF) and the Shi'ite Amal militia at the Shia quarters of West Beirut in 1987–88, brought a steady decline in the organization's activities in Lebanon for the rest of the civil war.

The last recorded attack claimed by the IJO as an independent group took place outside the Middle East in March 1992, when the Israeli Embassy in Buenos Aires, Argentina, was blown up in retaliation for Israel's assassination of Hezbollah's secretary-general Abbas al-Musawi in February that year.

This organization is no longer active. Some reports indicate that they merged with Hezbollah afterwards, with their leader Imad Mughniyeh appointed head of that party's overseas security apparatus. In 2008 Mughniyeh was killed by a car bomb in Damascus, Syria as a part of a CIA and Mossad combined operation.

== See also ==
- Hezbollah
- Organization of the Oppressed on Earth
- Islamic terrorism
- Jihad
- Lebanese Civil War
