= Abbas al-Musawi =

Secretary-General of Hezbollah from 1991 to 1992

- عباس الموسوي
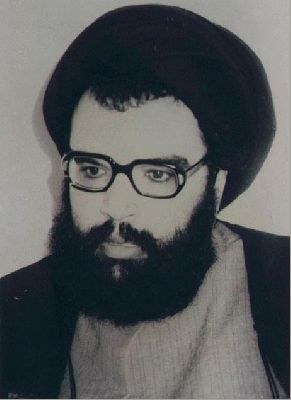
- al-Musawi, date unknown

2nd Secretary-General of Hezbollah
- In office May 1991 – 16 February 1992
- Deputy: Naim Qassem
- Preceded by: Subhi al-Tufayli
- Succeeded by: Hassan Nasrallah

Personal details
- Born: 26 October 1952 Al-Nabi Shayth, Lebanon
- Died: 16 February 1992 (aged 39) Nabatieh Governorate, Lebanon
- Cause of death: Assassination by airstrike
- Occupation: Shia cleric

Abbas al-Musawi (/əˈbɑːs əlmuːˈsɑːwi/ ə-BAHSS əl-moo-SAH-wee; Arabic: عباس الموسوي, romanized: ʿAbbās al-Mūsawī; 26 October 1952 – 16 February 1992) was a Lebanese Shia cleric who served as the second secretary-general of Hezbollah from 1991 until his assassination by Israel in 1992.

== Early life and education ==
Al-Musawi was born into a Shia family in the village of Al-Nabi Shayth in the Beqaa Valley in Lebanon on 26 October 1952. He spent eight years studying theology in a religious school in Najaf, Iraq, where he was deeply influenced by the views of Iranian religious leader Ruhollah Khomeini. Al-Musawi was a student, at the hawza in Najaf, of Muhammad Baqir al-Sadr, an influential Shi'a cleric, philosopher, political leader, and founder of the Da'wa Party of Iraq.

== Activities ==
Al-Musawi returned to Lebanon in 1978. Along with Subhi al-Tufayli he spearheaded the formation of Hezbollah movement in the Beqaa Valley in 1982, one of the three major areas of Shia population in Lebanon. From 1983 to 1985 he was reported to have served as operational head of the Hezbollah Special Security Apparatus. From late 1985 until April 1988 he was head of Hezbollah's military wing, the Islamic Resistance.

According to some reports (while others attribute the act to Subhi al-Tufayli), al-Musawi was responsible for the abduction of Lt. Col William Higgins while commander of Hezbollah's Islamic Resistance (military wing).

In 1991, Hezbollah had entered a new era with the end of both the Iran–Iraq War and Lebanese Civil War as well as the Taif Agreement and the release of the Kuwait 17 bombers. A new leader was thought to be needed to facilitate the release of the Western hostages held by Hezbollah and, more importantly, to shift Hezbollah's focus to resistance activity against Israel.

Al-Musawi also promised to "intensify [Hezbollah] military, political and popular action in order to undermine the peace-talks." He did not support entering mainstream politics. Unlike other Hezbollah figures, he advocated the acceptance of Taif Agreement, which was the rejection of a theocratic state in Lebanon.

== Assassination ==
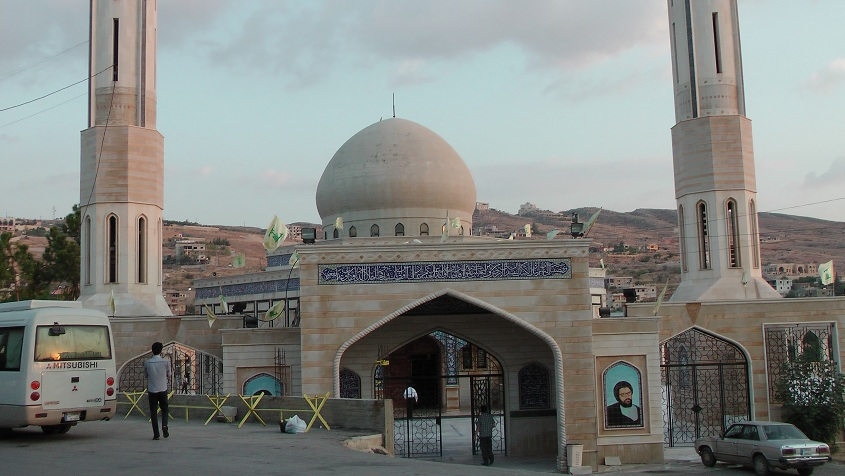
Abbas al-Musawi Shrine in Al-Nabi Shayth

On 16 February 1992, Israeli Apache helicopters fired missiles at the three vehicle motorcade of al-Musawi in southern Lebanon, killing al-Musawi, his wife, his five-year-old son, and four others. Israel said the attack had been planned as an assassination attempt in retaliation for the kidnapping and death of missing Israeli servicemen in 1986 and the abduction of US Marine and UN peace-keeping officer William R. Higgins in 1988.

Later it was revealed by Dieter Bednarz and Ronen Bergman that the original plan of Israel had been just to abduct al Musawi to ensure the release of Israeli prisoners. However, Ehud Barak, then Israeli chief of staff, convinced then Israeli Prime Minister Yitzhak Shamir to order his assassination. Bergman also said that some Israeli military officials had opposed the assassination, warning: "Hezbollah is not a one-man show, and Musawi is not the most extreme man in its leadership...[al-Musawi] would be replaced, perhaps by someone more radical.”

In retaliation, the Islamic Jihad Organization attacked the Israeli Embassy in Buenos Aires, killing 29 civilians. After the attack, the Islamic Jihad Organization declared that it was carried out as revenge for the martyr infant Hussein, al-Musawi's five-year-old son, who had been killed with his father.

On 7 February 1994, four Israeli soldiers were killed and three wounded in an ambush in southern Lebanon which Hezbollah announced was to mark the anniversary of al-Musawi’s death. There were no Hezbollah casualties in the attack.

Al-Musawi was succeeded as Secretary General of Hezbollah by Hassan Nasrallah. Nasrallah would prove to be a more effective leader than Al-Musawi, increasing Hezbollah's power and influence significantly. Nasrallah was assassinated in Beirut by an Israeli airstrike on 27 September 2024.

Party political offices
Preceded by Subhi al-Tufayli	Secretary-General of Hezbollah; 1991–1992	Succeeded by Hassan Nasrallah
