= Al-Nabi Shayth =

Al-Nabi Shayth ٱلنَّبِي شَيْت ٱلنَّبِي شِيْت Nabi Chit (based on French), Nabi Shith, Nabi Sheet
- Village
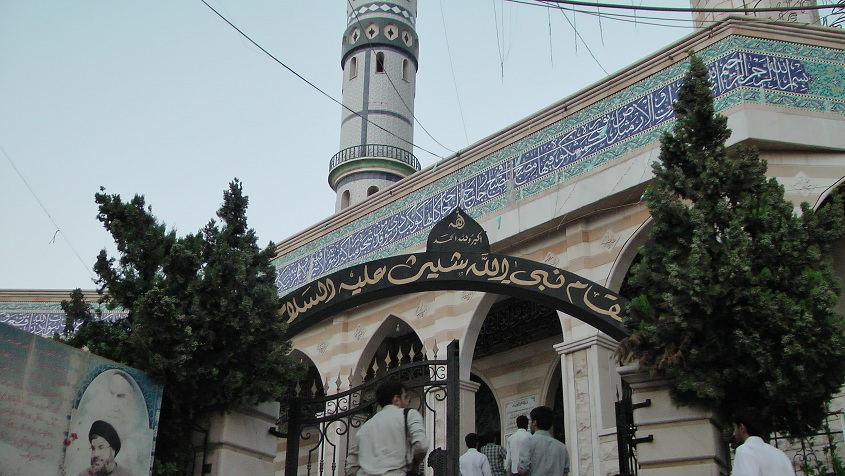
- Mosque of the Prophet Seth in the village of the same name

- Location in Lebanon Al-Nabi Shayth (Middle East) Al-Nabi Shayth (Asia)
- Coordinates: 33°52′20″N 36°06′46″E
- Country: Lebanon
- Governorate: Baalbek-Hermel
- District: Baalbek
- Elevation: 4,000 ft (1,220 m)

Al-Nabi Shayth (Arabic: ٱلنَّبِي شَيْت, romanized: An-Nabī Shayth, lit. Prophet Seth) is a village in eastern Lebanon, located in the Beqaa Valley and Baalbek District. The village's name comes from the claim that it is the burial site of Seth, the son of Adam. A mosque on the burial site contains the grave of Seth (though rival traditions place Seth's tomb in the Palestinian village of Bashsheet and in the Iraqi city of Mosul). The village is also the home town of Abbas al-Musawi, the second leader and co-founder of Hezbollah, as well as other senior Hezbollah leaders such as Fuad Shukr. The village of is predominantly inhabited by people with the surnames Helbawi, Al-Moussawi, Hazimeh and Chokr.

== History ==
Ibn Jubayr (1145–1217 CE) noted:

the two graves of Seth and Noah [..] are in the Bika', and two days' journey from Damascus. One who measured the tomb of Sheeth (Seth), reported to us that it was 40 fathoms (ba') long, and the tomb of Nuh (Noah) was 30. The tomb of Noah's son lies side-by-side with that of Noah. There is a building over the tombs, and an endowment for charitable purposes.

— Ibn Jubayr

In 1838, Eli Smith noted En-Neby Sheeth as a "Metawileh" village in the district of Baalbek.

On 22 December 1998 the Israeli Air Force bombed a farm house in al-Nabi Shayth killing a woman and six children. The target had been an antenna belonging to Hizbollah's Voice of the Oppressed radio station. Hizbollah responded by firing rockets into Northern Israel, injuring sixteen people. Two weeks later the IAF again tried to destroy the radio mast, injuring seven villagers. On April 14, 2024, the IDF carried out an airstrike on the settlement, saying that they were targeting a Hezbollah run weapons manufacturing site.

== See also ==
- Nabi Habeel Mosque, Syria
- Karak Nuh
- List of burial places of Abrahamic figures

== Bibliography ==
- Why They Died: Civilian Casualties in Lebanon During the 2006 War. HRW. 2007.
