= Shia clergy =

Religious authorities in a branch of Islam

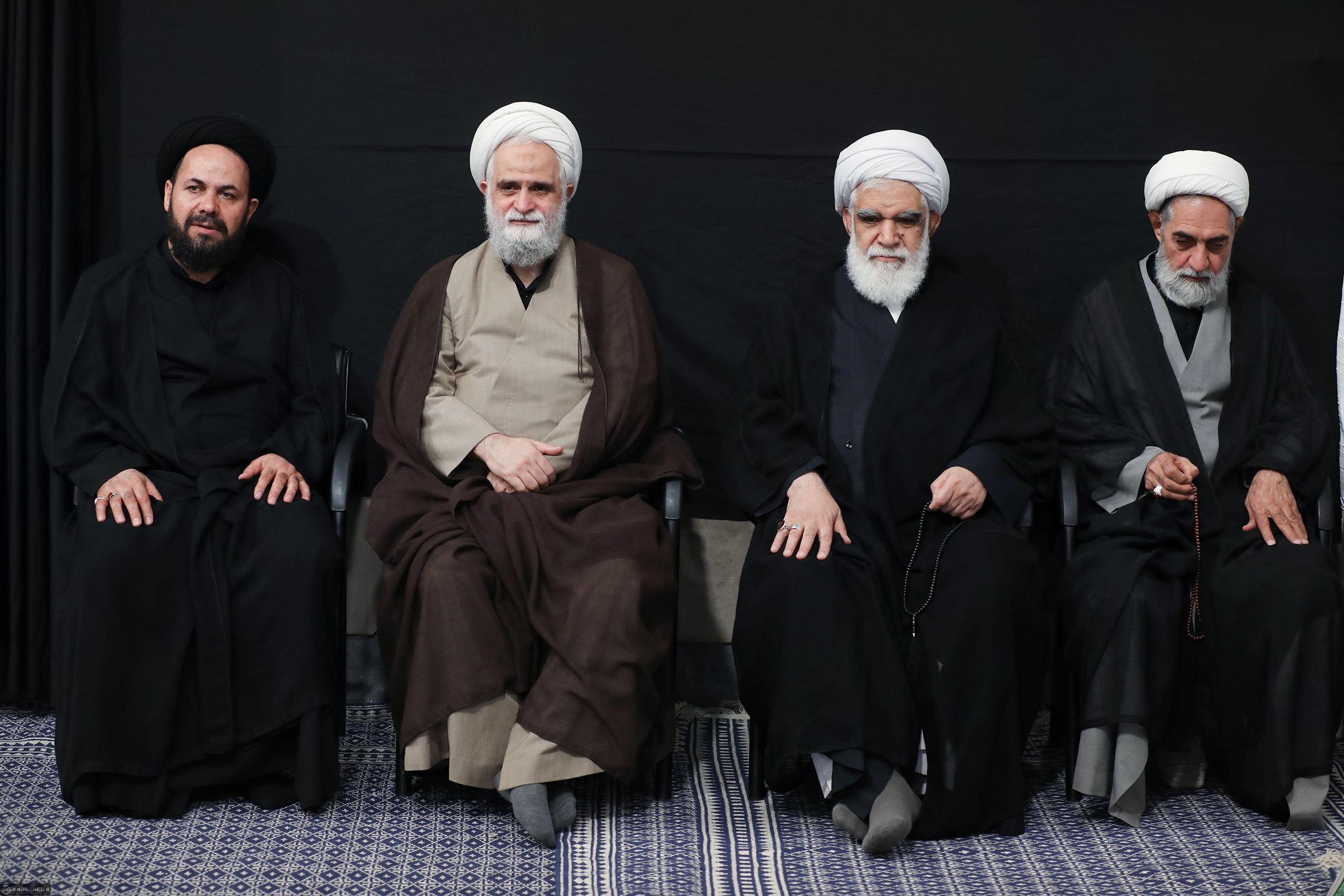
Clerics at the Office of the Supreme Leader of Iran during Ashura in 2025

The Shia clergy are the religious leaders of Shia Islam, who are educated in hawzas. Shia Islam places great importance on the guidance of clergy, and each branch of Shi'ism maintains its own clerical structure. The most well-known Shia clergy belongs to the largest branch of Shia Islam, Twelver Shi'ism. As in other branches of Islam, Shia scholars are collectively known as the ulema. Individual clerics are referred to as mullah or ākhūnd, but because those terms have developed "a somewhat pejorative connotation" since at least the 1980s, the term rūḥānī has been "promoted" as an alternative, "especially by the clerical class itself".

== Twelver ==
=== Usuli school ===
Among the different schools of Twelver Shi'i Islam are Usuli and Akhbari. In the late 18th and early 19th century, the Usuli "triumphed" over the Akhbari Twelver. Usuli Shia argued that "since only someone who has expended the time and effort to become a mujtahid could possibly know all the details of religious observances and law", it was obligatory for "anyone who was not himself a mujtahid to follow the rulings" of one so as to avoid committing religious errors. They believe the 12th Imam, ordered them to follow the scholars (Fuqaha) who "guard their soul, protect their religion, and follow the commandments of their master (Allah)". Consequently, the Usuli Shia community is divided into mujtahid (those who follow their own independent judgement in religious law) and muqallid (those who must follow the rulings of a mujtahid). The practice of following a mujtahid is called taqlid. Because of this, it can be said that clergy in the Usuli Twelver Shi'a have exerted much more authority in their religious community than the Sunni ulema (or Akhbari Shi'i ulema) in theirs.

Also as a consequence of the dominance of Usuli Shi'ism, mujtahid have risen in both importance and number. Up until the mid-19th century there were "three or four" mujtahid "anywhere at any one time"; by the end of the century there were several hundred. Also during the 19th century, improvements in communication technology gave a higher profile to the most eminent mujtahids, as "important or controversial questions" no longer had to be left to local mujtahids. In "this way a small number of eminent mujtahids in Najaf became regarded as being the marja' at-taqlid for a particular area to be referred to "by both "ordinary Shi'is and local mujtahids". As of 2014, there were over 60 recognized Marj in the Shia Muslim world. In Iran (the largest majority-Twelver Shi'i country) and "to a lesser extent" in other Shi'i communities, "the clerical class [ulema] constitutes a fairly distinctive entity".

Shia believe that the study of Islamic literature is a continual process, and is necessary for identifying all of God's laws. They believe that the process of finding God's laws from the available Islamic literature will facilitate dealing with any circumstance. They believe that they can interpret the Qur'an and the Twelver Shi'a traditions with the same authority as their predecessors. This process of ijtihad has provided a means to deal with current issues from an Islamic perspective.

=== Education ===
Traditionally (and as of 1985, at least in Iran) education of a member of the ulema (and many other people) began with primary school or maktab. After completing this, those who wanted to be members of the ulama attended madrasa (religious college, "collectively referred to as hawza", plural hawzat) situated in big cities. The most prestigious of them were located in the holy cities of Qum, Mashhad and Najaf. The madrasa course of study has three level:

1. Muqaddamat (preliminary level) where they would develop a "good grasp" of Arabic language and their teachers would be "senior students and assistants of the principal mujtahids". This level may take ten years or so.
2. As-Sutuh (the externals) here the teachers are usually recently minted mujtahids "seeking to build up their reputations", students may pick and choose lectures and develop a special interest, but must obtain "a thorough grasp" of the "two principal subjects", fiqh and usul al-fiqh to advance to the next level.
3. Dars al-Kharij (graduation classes), the students in their mid-twenties, and the teaching done by the principal mujtahids, there are "no set books", and the style of teaching often "dialectical involvement of the audience".

Tuition, room and board is provided for students from charitable contributions, if only at a very spartan level.

==== Ijaza ====
Unlike in most Western higher education programs (where failure to graduate is usually considered a failure on the part of some combination of the student, school or society), "only a small percentage" of talib who start out in a madrasa complete these courses and receive a ijaza. Instead, the number of talib thins out at each level of promotion, with the drop-outs going on to less demanding and prestigious, but still respected religious roles. Most drop out at some point out of "financial or personal considerations", lack of intellect, and/or lack of perseverance. To be considered for a ijaza (literally "permission, authorisation", i.e. authorisation to exercise ijtihad and thus can be called a mujtihad) a student (talib) must be

a. Maturity
b. Of the male sex
c. Legitimate birth
d. Faith
e. Intelligence
f. Justice (i.e. following Sharia in words and deeds, its obligations and prohibitions).

They must write a treatise on fiqh or usul al-fiqh and be granted the ijaza from a "recognized mujtahid". It is "uncommon" to obtain an ijaza before the age of 30, and "not uncommon" for 40 and 50-year-olds to still be students.

=== Hierarchy, types of ulama ===
The ulama is much larger than just "recognized" mujtahids (i.e. mujtahids who have a following of Muslims who are prepared to refer to them on matters of Islamic law). Below these are those who drop out of madrasa "consider themselves members of the ulama" although they make their livelihood in some non-religious occupation (merchant, craftsman, etc.). Others are talib who "obviously" did not have the ability to complete the course and become a mujtahid, in the eyes of their mujtihad and are asked by him to take up a position as a

- teacher for a maktab
- mullah for a village
- pīshnamāz (prayer leader)
- mutawallī (custodian) of a shrine or endowment

by a town that has asked the mujtihad to provide them with one. Other occupations often filled by drop outs -- though they "need not have attended a madrasa" to be one are

- wāʿiẓ (traveling preacher) or
- rawḍa-khān (narrator of the tragedy of Hussein at Karbalā).

In addition there are those who earned an ijaza but did not become "recognized", because they lacked the patronage of an eminent mujtahid, the prestige among other students, family connections, or talent for preaching and communicating. These are sometimes called mujtahid muḥtaṭ (mujtahid in abeyance). The hierarchy of Twelver Shi'i has been described as one of deference, that is the lower ranking ulama will defer to a higher ranking one—"a locally prominent mujtahid"—who will defer to an "eminent mujtahid" (marja' al-taqlid) in Najaf, Qum or Mashhad.

- Ayatollah (sign of God) is a fairly recent term, originating in the 20th century as a title for marja' at-taqlid, but suffering from inflation such that following the 1979 Iranian Revolution it was used "for any established mujtahid".
- Hujjatu'l-Islam (proof of Islam) originated as a title for certain high-level mujtahids in the 19th century (Sayyid Muhammad Baqir Shafti, Mirza-yi Shirazi); following the 1979 Iranian Revolution it was used for "aspiring mujtahid".

=== Devaluation trend ===
The title of Ayatollah (and other Iranian Shi'i titles) has been "cheapened" in recent decades. According to Michael M. J. Fischer, the Iranian revolution led to "rapid inflation of religious titles", and almost every senior cleric was called an Ayatollah. The same phenomenon happened to the title Hujjat al-Islam before, which is today a less prestigious title than Ayatollah. As of 19th century, it was given to people who were not only Mujtahids but also were the most distinguished clerics of that time. By the 21st century, there are "tens of thousands" called with that title (ayatollah), who are just aspiring to become a Mujtahid. This trend led to the invention of a new title called Ayatollah al-Uzma (lit. 'Great Sign of God'). In the beginning, about half a dozen people were addressed with the latter title; as of 2015, the number of people who claimed that title was reportedly over 50.

== Historical role in politics and society ==
=== Modern history ===
The Shia clerics in this period were closely tied with the bazaars that were in turn strongly linked with the artisans and farmers that together formed traditional socioeconomic communities and centers of associational life with Islamic occasions and functions tying them to clerics who interpreted Islamic laws to settle commercial disputes and taxed the well-to-do to provide welfare for devout poorer followers. A succession of prayer meetings and rituals were organized by both clergy and the laity. Bazaars also enjoyed ties with more modern sectors of Iranians society as many Iranian university students were from the merchant class. But since the 1970s, the Shah of Iran aroused the defense and oppositions of the bazaar by attempts at bring under control their autonomous councils and marginalizing the clergy by taking over their educational and welfare activities. This combined with the growing public and clerical dissatisfaction with Shah's secular policies and his reliance on foreign powers, particularly the United States, led to a nationwide revolution, that saw a high-ranking cleric Ayatollah Khomeini and his clerical disciples as its top leadership, that deposed the Pahlavi Shah and founded the Islamic Republic of Iran.

== Ismaili ==
The Imamate in Nizārī Ismā'īlī doctrine (Arabic: إمامة) is a concept in Nizari Isma'ilism which defines the political, religious and spiritual dimensions of authority concerning Islamic leadership over the nation of believers. The primary function of the Imamate is to establish an institution between an Imam who is present and living in the world and his following whereby each is granted rights and responsibilities. The term Dāʻī al-Mutlaq (Arabic: الداعي المطلق) literally means "the absolute or unrestricted missionary". In Ismā'īlī Islām, the term dāʻī has been used to refer to important religious leaders other than the hereditary Imāms and the Daʻwa or "Mission" is a clerical-style organization. The "Daʻwa" was a term for the Ismā'īlī faith itself from early on. The Dāʻīs are also called Syednas.

== See also ==
- Akhoond
- Hawza
- Imamzadeh
- List of ayatollahs
- Lists of maraji
- Ulama
