= Hezbollah cross-border raid =

Hezbollah cross-border raid may refer to:

- 2000 Hezbollah cross-border raid
- 2005 Hezbollah cross-border raid
- 2006 Hezbollah cross-border raid
