= 2000 Hezbollah cross-border raid =

2000 capture and killing of Israeli border troops by Lebanese militants

- Part of the 2000–2006 Shebaa Farms conflict, the Hezbollah–Israel conflict, the Israeli–Lebanese conflict and the Iran–Israel proxy conflict
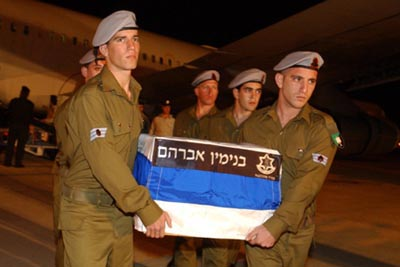
- Coffins of the Israeli soldiers abducted and killed by Hezbollah during the raid
Date	7 October 2000
Location	Israel–Lebanon border 33°17′0″N 35°42′0″E
Result	Hezbollah victory: Outbreak of 2-month-long exchanges of fire between Israel and Hezbollah on the border

Belligerents
Israel	Hezbollah

Casualties and losses
3 soldiers captured (later died)	Unknown

The 2000 Hezbollah cross-border raid occurred at the boundary between Lebanon and the Golan Heights (see Blue Line) on October 7. Hezbollah militants captured three Israeli soldiers while they were patrolling the security fence, and subsequently took them into Lebanon. While the time and circumstances of the three soldiers' deaths remain unknown, their bodies were returned to Israel in a prisoner exchange on 29 January 2004.

The abduction was the first incident between Israel and Lebanon after the Israeli withdrawal from southern Lebanon. It was followed by several other attempts by Hezbollah to abduct Israeli soldiers at the border; eventually, on 12 July 2006, the 2006 Hezbollah cross-border raid saw eight Israeli soldiers killed and another two abducted and later killed in Lebanon, which triggered the 2006 Lebanon War.

== The attack and abduction ==
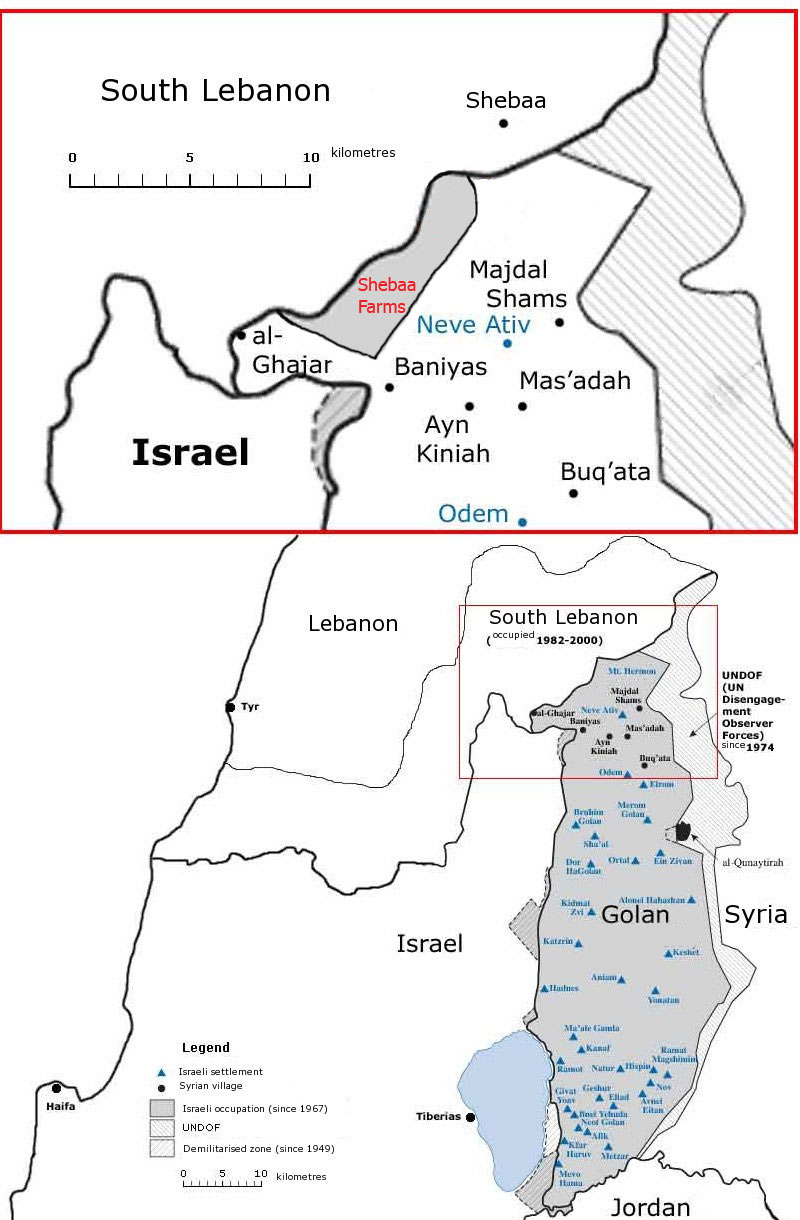
Map of the Sheeba Farms and surrounding area.

While patrolling the border near the Shebaa Farms, an IDF patrol manned by Staff Sgt. Adi Avitan (22), Staff Sgt. Benyamin Avraham (21), and Staff Sgt. Omar Sawaid (27), was ambushed by a Hezbollah squad. The patrol car was hit by a rocket. Having entered Israeli-occupied territory in a Range Rover, the Hezbollah squad blasted a gate in the fence, collected the captives and made a quick getaway.

Several factors contributed to the ease with which Hezbollah could carry out the abduction. The location of the abduction was situated between the 91st and the 36th Division. IDF bureaucracy prevented coordination and information sharing between the two. The IDF had received indications that Hezbollah was planning an abduction at the site. A patrol from the Egoz elite unit belonging to the 91st Division had observed Hezbollah activity in the area, which seemed to be an ideal place for an abduction. This information had not been passed on to the 36th Division. Neither the electronic border fence nor the surveillance cameras was functioning at the relevant section but was repaired only after the incident.

The bodies of the three captives were returned in a prisoner exchange in 2004. It is not known when or under what circumstances the three soldiers were killed. In October 2001, IDF stated that Israeli military intelligence estimated that "the three were either killed during the initial Hezbollah attack or immediately afterward."

Ya'akov Avitan, father of Adi Avitan, said that a video released by Hezbollah and broadcast by LBC indicates that, "the boys were alive when they were kidnapped... they [Hezbollah] murdered our boys in cold blood after the kidnap."

The Hannibal Directive was an IDF order stating that abductions of Israeli soldiers must be prevented by all means, including shooting at or shelling a get-away car, thereby risking the lives of the captives. When the abduction of the three soldiers became known, some say that the Hannibal directive was invoked, with Israeli attack helicopters firing at 26 cars moving in the area. The number of casualties, Hezbollah or civilian, is not known. There are however no clear indications that the captives were inside any of the attacked cars or were harmed in the attacks.

Hezbollah denied the International Committee of the Red Cross (ICRC) and other parties permission to visit the captives and to learn at first hand about their state of health and the conditions they were held in.

== Prisoner exchange ==
On November 9, 2003, the Government of Israel announced that an arrangement had been concluded regarding the return of the three missing IDF soldiers - as well as abducted Israeli businessman and reserve IDF colonel Elchanan Tenenbaum, who had been captured by Hezbollah after being lured to Dubai for a drug deal.

Hezbollah instigated negotiations over the release of 14 Lebanese prisoners, together with a number of Palestinian prisoners. On January 29, 2004, 30 Lebanese and Arab prisoners, 400 Palestinian prisoners, German national and Hezbollah member Steven Smyrek, and the remains of 59 Lebanese militants and civilians were transferred to Hezbollah, along with maps showing Israeli mines in South Lebanon, in exchange for Tenenbaum and the remains of the three dead soldiers.

Among the 435 people released by Israel were Mustafa Dirani and Sheik Abdel Karim Obeid. These two individuals were kidnapped, in 1994 and 1989 respectively, for use as bargaining chips in the effort to secure the release of the most famous of the Israeli MIAs, Ron Arad. Fearing the release of these men would end any hope of finding Arad, his family attempted to take legal action to prevent their release. Nothing came of this effort.

The bodies were positively identified and arrived during the evening hours in Israel. The soldiers were returned in an IAF aircraft along with an IDF delegation headed by Chief Military Rabbi, Brg. Gen. Israel Weiss. Upon the arrival of the coffins, a military ceremony took place in the presence of their families and commanders. The ceremony was attended by President Moshe Katsav, Prime Minister Ariel Sharon, Minister of Defense Shaul Mofaz, Knesset Speaker Reuven Rivlin and IDF Chief of Staff, Lt. Gen. Moshe Ya'alon.

== Post abduction events ==
- Hezbollah continued to attack IDF patrols in the Shebaa Farms area until the 2006 Lebanon War.
- Hezbollah's desire for Israeli prisoners that could be exchanged with Israel led to Hezbollah's abduction of Israeli soldiers, which triggered the 2006 Lebanon War.
- On July 16, 2008, Hezbollah exchanged the bodies of the two Israeli soldiers captured during the 2006 Lebanon War, Ehud Goldwasser and Eldad Regev, for Samir Kuntar, four Hezbollah militants captured by Israel during the 2006 Lebanon War (Khaled Zidan, Maher Kurani, Mohammed Sarur, and Hussein Suleiman), and the bodies of 200 Lebanese and Palestinians.

== See also ==
- Israeli–Lebanese conflict
- Iran–Israel proxy conflict
- 2000–2006 Shebaa Farms conflict
- 2005 Hezbollah cross-border raid
- 2006 Hezbollah cross-border raid
- 2006 Lebanon War
- United Nations Security Council Resolution 425
- United Nations Interim Force in Lebanon
- Israeli prisoner exchanges
- Israeli MIAs
