= Mohamad Issa =

Hezbollah military commander

Mohammad Ahmad Issa
- محمد أحمد عيسى

Hezbollah military commander

Personal details
- Born: 1972 Arabsalim, Lebanon
- Died: 18 January 2015 (aged 42–43) Quneitra Governorate, Syria
- Party: Hezbollah
- Nickname: Abu Issa

Mohammad Issa (Arabic: محمد أحمد عيسى; January 30, 1972 – January 18, 2015) was a Lebanese Hezbollah military commander and chief of operations in Southern Syria. He was killed by an Israeli drone strike in 2015 during the Syrian Civil War.

== Biography ==
Mohammed Issa, also known as Abu Issa, was from Arabsalim in the Nabatieh District of southern Lebanon. His father was Syrian and his mother Lebanese. He joined Hezbollah by the age of 15, and rose through the ranks and took a leadership in many battles with Israel, including the 2006 Lebanon War. He was said to be leading Hezbollah's operations in the Golan at the time of his death and was the only one officially identified by Hezbollah as a commander.

== Death ==
An Israeli drone strike killed Mohammad Issa, one Iranian brigadier general, Jihad Mughniyah and four Hezbollah Field Officers in Quneitra Governorate. They were driving in a convoy in Quneitra Province alongside Revolutionary Guard Council (IRGC) near the Israeli-occupied Golan Heights, and on 18 January 2015 the convoy was destroyed by an Israeli drone.

== See also ==
- Mustafa Badreddine
