= 2000–2006 Shebaa Farms conflict =

Low-level conflict between Hezbollah and Israel

- Part of the Israeli–Lebanese conflict, the Hezbollah–Israel conflict and the Iran–Israel proxy conflict
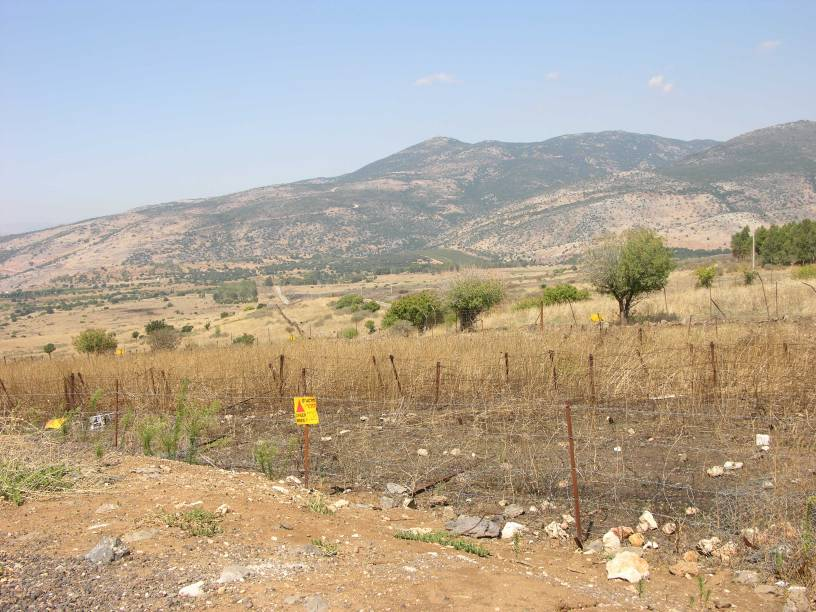
- Minefields at Tel Faher in the Golan Heights, with Shebaa Farms in the background (2009)
Date	7 October 2000 – 12 July 2006 (5 years, 9 months and 5 days)
Location	Shebaa Farms, Golan Heights–Lebanon border
Result	Beginning of the 2006 Lebanon War

Belligerents
Israel	Hezbollah

Commanders and leaders
Moshe Katsav; Ehud Barak; Ariel Sharon; Ehud Olmert	Hassan Nasrallah; Imad Mughniyah

Casualties and losses
(Israel) 16 killed (Israel) 37 wounded (Israel) 2 captured	13 killed (lowest estimate) and 2 officials assassinated 1 killed and 7 wounded
- 9 Israeli civilians killed and 8 wounded Unknown Lebanese civilian casualties 1 French UNIFIL soldier killed 1 Lebanese soldier wounded

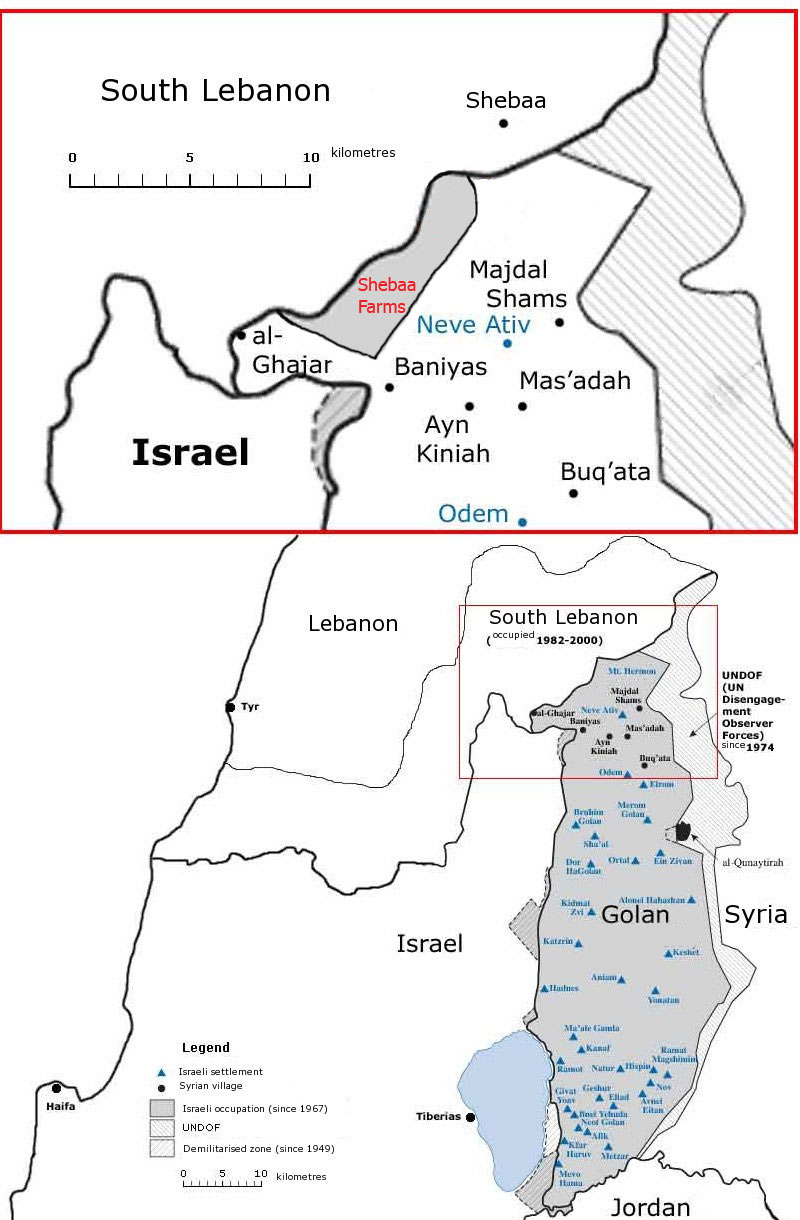
Map of the Shebaa Farms

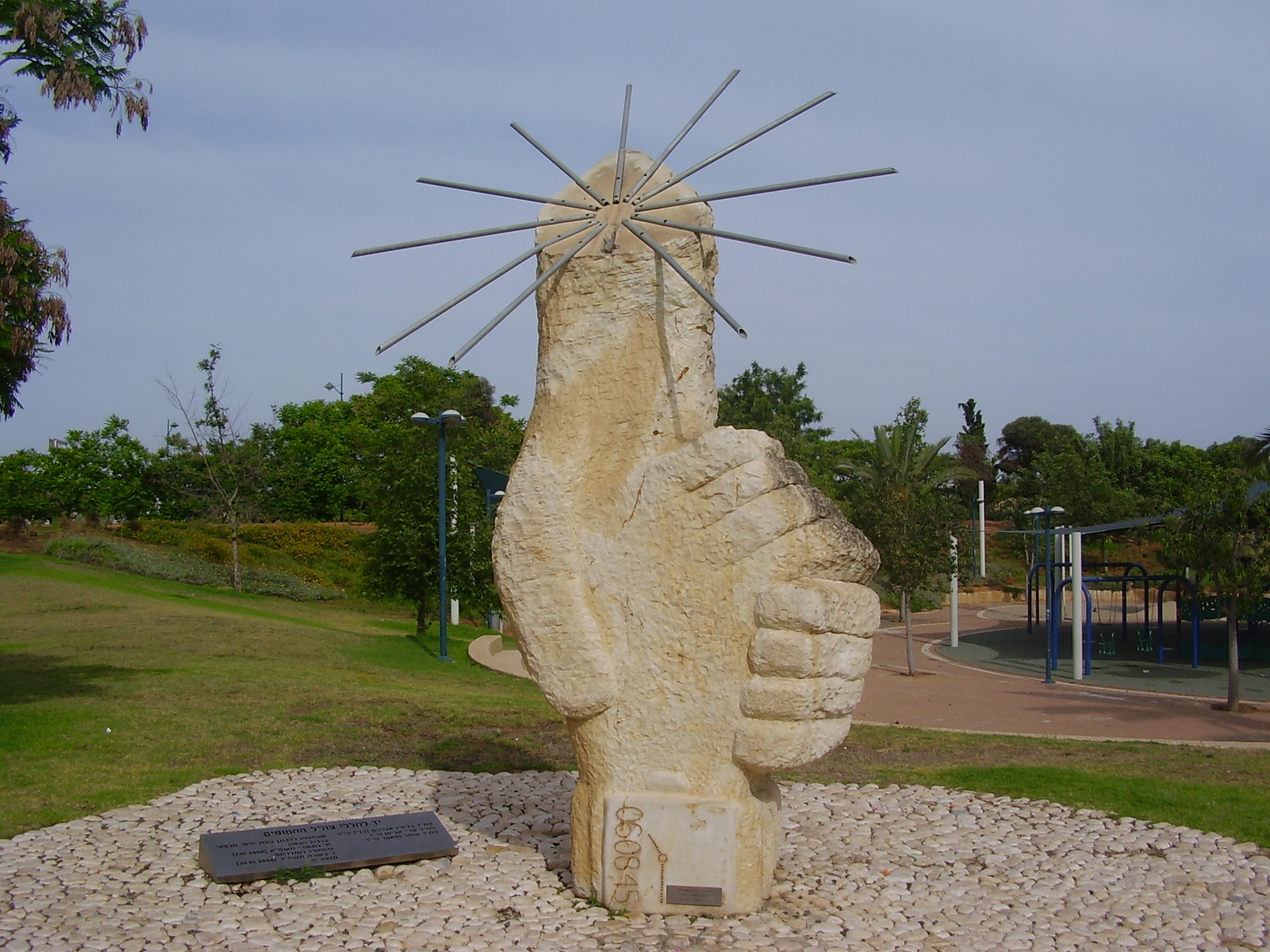
Memorial in Petah Tikva to 3 IDF soldiers, killed and kidnapped by Hezbollah in October 2000.

The 2000–2006 Shebaa Farms conflict was a low-level border conflict between Israel and Hezbollah for control of Shebaa Farms, a disputed territory located on the Golan Heights–Lebanon border. Fighting between the two sides primarily consisted of Hezbollah rocket and mortar attacks on Israel and Israeli artillery barrages and airstrikes on Hezbollah in southern Lebanon. Clashes began a few months after the 2000 Israeli withdrawal from Lebanon, which Hezbollah viewed as incomplete due to the presence of the Israel Defense Forces in Shebaa Farms. The conflict culminated in the 2006 Lebanon War; Israel retains control over the territory.

== Timeline of attacks ==
=== 2000 ===
- 7 October – Hezbollah launched a cross-border raid. Three IDF soldiers were killed and their bodies were captured. Five people were subsequently injured by Israeli artillery fire.
- 26 November – An explosive charge was detonated while an IDF force was on a road opening mission. One soldier was killed and two wounded.

=== 2001 ===
- 31 January – Six mortar bombs were fired at an Israeli outpost near the Lebanese border, causing no casualties.
- 16 February – Antitank fire hit an IDF convoy. One soldier was killed and three wounded. Israel responded with airstrikes on targets in South Lebanon.
- 14 April – An antitank missile was fired at an IDF tank, killing a soldier. In response, Israeli aircraft bombed a Syrian radar station in Lebanon, killing a Syrian soldier and injuring four others.
- 29 June – Hezbollah fighters fired antitank missiles and mortar shells at IDF positions, injuring two soldiers.
- 1 July – IAF warplanes bombed a Syrian radar station in Lebanon, wounding three Syrian soldiers and a Lebanese soldier. Hezbollah responded by shelling positions in northern Israel. IAF helicopter gunships then attacked Hezbollah positions.

=== 2002 ===
- 12 March – Hezbollah fire killed six Israeli civilians, including an off-duty IDF officer.
- 29 August – One IDF soldier was killed and two soldiers were injured in rocket fire.
- December – Israeli aircraft carried out numerous airstrikes throughout Lebanon. As well as targeting roads, bridges, and ammunition depots, they also bombed several power and electrical transformer stations throughout Lebanon, leaving large parts of Beirut and its suburbs, communities in the Chouf District, Baalbek, and Bint Jbeil without electricity. Meanwhile, Hezbollah rocket fire hit Kiryat Shmona, killing two Israeli civilians.

=== 2003 ===
- 7 May – Hezbollah attacked IDF positions in Shebaa farms with rockets, mortars, and small arms, killing a soldier and wounding five.
- 20 July – Hezbollah snipers killed two IDF soldiers at a border post. The IDF retaliated with tank fire at a Hezbollah position, killing a Hezbollah fighter. The IAF launched multiple flights over Lebanon, two of which generated powerful sonic booms over Beirut.
- 22 July – Two Israeli civilians in Shlomi were wounded by Hezbollah anti-aircraft shells fired at IAF warplanes over South Lebanon.
- 2 August – Hezbollah member Ali Hussein Saleh was assassinated by a car bomb in Beirut, allegedly by Israeli intelligence.
- 3 August – Hezbollah militants fired rockets and mortars at three Israeli military positions in Shebaa farms. Israel retaliated with airstrikes.
- 10 August – An Israeli teenager was killed and four civilians wounded by shrapnel from a Hezbollah anti-aircraft shell fired into northern Israel.
- 6 October – One IDF soldier was killed by Hezbollah gunfire. Hezbollah anti-tank missiles and rockets were also fired at an IDF post in the Reaches Ramim area.

=== 2004 ===
- 19 January – An Israeli soldier was killed and another severely wounded after a Hezbollah anti-tank missile struck an IDF armored bulldozer that crossed into Lebanon to clear explosives.
- 20 January – Israel bombed two Hezbollah bases in the Bekaa Valley, causing an unknown number of casualties.
- 7 May – Hezbollah fire killed one Israeli soldier and severely wounded two others. Afterward, both Israel and Hezbollah shelled each other across the border.
- 19 July – Hezbollah official Ghaleb Awwali was assassinated by a car bomb, allegedly by Israeli agents.
- 20 July – Hezbollah sniper fire killed two IDF soldiers at a border post. In retaliation, Israeli helicopter gunships fired missiles at Hezbollah positions, and an Israeli tank fired at a Hezbollah post near Ayta ash Shab, killing a Hezbollah fighter. Hezbollah fighters on the border returned fire, and subsequently came under attack from Israeli helicopters.

=== 2005 ===
- 9 January – A roadside bomb attack in northern Israel killed one soldier. Israel responded with shelling, during which a French officer serving with UNIFIL was killed and a Swedish officer and Lebanese civilian were wounded.
- 7 April – Two Israeli Arabs from Ghajar were kidnapped by Hezbollah and held for four days, interrogated, and released.
- June – An Israeli Paratrooper unit discovered three Hezbollah fighters attempting to infiltrate and opened fire, killing one.
- 29 June – After an Israeli soldier was killed and four wounded by Hezbollah mortar fire, Israeli warplanes and artillery launched attacks against Hezbollah in southern Lebanon.
- 30 June – Hezbollah guerrillas launched an attack on Israeli forces in Shebaa farms, wounding six soldiers. Israel responded with an airstrike that killed a Hezbollah fighter.
- 21 November – Five Hezbollah guerrillas crossed into the Israel-occupied Golan Heights using motorcycles and ATVs, and attacked an outpost in Ghajar manned by an IDF paratrooper unit. All five attackers were killed by a sniper from the paratrooper unit. In response, Israeli warplanes struck Hezbollah targets in southern Lebanon; Hezbollah responded by firing mortars and rockets at Israeli outposts and villages, wounding nine soldiers and two civilians.
- 28 December – After rocket fire from Lebanon hits Northern Israel, Israeli warplanes bombed a guerrilla base south of Beirut.

=== 2006 ===
- 27 May – In what was described as the most intense clash since the withdraw of Israeli troops in 2000, Hezbollah fired rockets into Northern Israel, wounding a soldier. Israel responded with airstrikes, killing two Hezbollah fighters. The Hezbollah attack may have been retaliation for the killing of Mahmoud al-Majzoub.
- 12 July – The 2006 Hezbollah cross-border raid marked the end of the 2000–2006 Shebaa Farms conflict and the beginning of the 2006 Lebanon War.

== Aftermath ==
Walid Jumblatt, a Lebanese Druze politician and leader of the Progressive Socialist Party, stated that Lebanon has no claims to the Shebaa Farms. The prime minister and president stated that Lebanon has a claim to the area.

Following the Israeli war against Hezbollah in 2006, U.N. Security Council Resolution 1701 called for the "Delineation of the international borders of Lebanon, especially in those areas where the border is disputed or uncertain, including in the Shebaa farms area."

On 28 August 2006, Hezbollah fighters withdrew from positions near the Shebaa Farms area.

== See also ==
- Israeli–Lebanese conflict
- Iran–Israel proxy conflict
- 2000 Hezbollah cross-border raid
- 2005 Hezbollah cross-border raid
- 2006 Hezbollah cross-border raid
- 2006 Lebanon War
- United Nations Security Council Resolution 425
- United Nations Interim Force in Lebanon
- Israeli MIAs
- List of Arab–Israeli prisoner exchanges
