= Imad Mughniyeh =

Lebanese militant leader (1962–2008)

- عماد مغنية
- Mughniyeh in the 2000s

Hezbollah Chief of Staff
- Preceded by: Unknown
- Succeeded by: Mustafa Badreddine

Personal details
- Born: 7 December 1962 Tayr Dibba, Lebanon
- Died: 12 February 2008 (aged 45) Kafr Sousa, Damascus, Syria
- Party: Hezbollah
- Children: 7, including Jihad, and Mustafa
- Occupation: Assassin, revolutionarist, militant jihadist

Imad Fayez Mughniyeh (Arabic: عماد فايز مغنية; 7 December 1962 – 12 February 2008), also known by his nom de guerre al-Hajj Radwan (الحاج رضوان), was a Lebanese militant leader who was the founding member of Lebanon's Islamic Jihad Organization and number two in Hezbollah's leadership. He is believed to have been Hezbollah's chief of staff and overseer of its military, intelligence, and security apparatus. He has been described as a skilled military tactician and a highly elusive figure. He was often referred to as an ‘untraceable ghost’.

U.S. and Israeli officials say Mughniyeh was directly and personally involved in terrorist attacks and was the mastermind of many suicide bombings, murders, kidnappings, and assassinations. Mughniyeh formed Unit 121 as Hezbollah's covert assassination squad and he was behind the 1983 Beirut barracks bombing and 1983 United States embassy bombing, in which over 350 people were killed, as well as the kidnapping of dozens of foreigners in Lebanon in the 1980s. He was indicted in Argentina for his role in the 1992 Israeli embassy attack in Buenos Aires. The highest-profile attacks he was involved in occurred in the early 1980s when Mughniyeh was in his early twenties. U.S. intelligence officials accused him of killing more United States citizens than any other man prior to the 11 September attacks.

Mughniyeh was known by his nom de guerre Al-Hajj Radwan. He was included in the European Union's list of wanted terrorists and had a US$5 million bounty on the FBI Most Wanted Terrorists list. To many in his home country, Lebanon and the Middle East, he is a national symbol and hero.

As part of a joint CIA–Mossad operation, Mughniyeh was assassinated on the night of 12 February 2008 by a car bomb that was detonated as he passed by on foot, in the Kafr Sousa neighbourhood of Damascus, Syria.

== Early life ==
Mughniyeh was born in the village of Tayr Dibba, near Tyre, on 7 December 1962 to a peasant family of Lebanon's southern Shi'a heartland. His father's name was Fayez. He was mistakenly thought to be the son of Jawad Mughniyeh, a religious cleric. His birth date had also been given as July 1962. Mughniyeh had two younger brothers, Jihad and Fouad. About a decade after Mughniyeh's birth, the family moved to southern Beirut. CIA South Group records state that Mughniyeh lived in Ayn Al-Dilbah in South Beirut. Mughniyeh was described a popular boy and a "natural entertainer" who cracked jokes at family weddings and "worked the crowd with a confidence unusual for a youth his age."

Mughniyeh and his cousin Mustafa Badreddine joined Fatah at an early age. Mughniyeh was discovered by fellow Lebanese Ali Abu Hassan Deeb (who would later become a Hezbollah leader) and quickly rose through the ranks of the movement. In the mid-1970s, Mugniyeh organized the "Student Brigade," a unit of 100 young men which became part of Yasser Arafat's elite Force 17. Mughniyeh temporarily left Fatah in 1981 due to differences of opinion on the regime of Saddam Hussein. Mughniyeh, a religious Shiite, was upset by the murder of the Iraqi Grand Ayatollah Muhammad Baqir as-Sadr in 1980 as well as a previous attempt by the Iraqi intelligence on the life of Lebanese Ayatollah Muhammad Hussein Fadlallah.

Fatah was formally allied with the Lebanese National Movement, which included the pro-Iraqi branch of the Ba'ath Party. Mughniyeh was forced to leave Fatah after armed confrontations with Ba’ath activists. He and his comrades organized a body guard unit for Ayatollah Fadlallah and other Shiite clerics in Lebanon. Mughniyeh accompanied Ayatollah Fadlallah on a Hajj pilgrimage in 1980 and thus earned his Hajj title.

Mughniyeh was briefly a student in the engineering department at the American University of Beirut. After the Israeli invasion of Lebanon in 1982, he rejoined Fatah. He was wounded in the fighting in West Beirut. After the withdrawal of PLO forces from Beirut in September 1982, Mughniyeh played a key role in resisting the Israeli occupation, revealing the location of Fatah arms caches. He remained a Fatah member during this period but also worked the leftist Lebanese National Movement and Islamic resistance groups. In 1984, he joined the newly created Islamic Resistance of Hezbollah. However, he remained close to Fatah leader Khalil al-Wazir (Abu Jihad) until the latter's assassination in 1988. He remained committed to the Palestine cause throughout his life and founded Hezbollah's secret "Committee for Elimination of Israel" in 2000. In later years, and especially after the Oslo accords, Mughniyeh and Hezbollah sided with the more militant Palestinian factions such as Hamas and the Islamic Jihad.

== Personal life ==
In 1983, Mughniyeh married his cousin, Saada Badr Al Din, who is the sister of Mustafa Badreddine. Mughniyeh had three children according to his mother: Fatima (born August 1984), Mustafa (born January 1987), and Jihad (estimated to have been age 25 at death). In September 1991, Mugniyeh's wife and children were sent to Tehran for security reasons. Later his family began to live in south Lebanon. Mughniyeh also married an Iranian woman, Wafaa Mughniyeh, with whom he lived in Damascus.

On 21 December 1994 a car bomb in Chyah, Beirut, killed Mughniyeh's brother, Fuad. Two other people were killed in the explosion and sixteen wounded.

Mughniyeh's younger son, Jihad, was killed in the January 2015 Mazraat Amal incident in the Syrian Golan sector on 18 January 2015. Five other Hezbollah members and an Iranian Quds Force general were also killed in the attack.

== Personality ==
According to former CIA agent Robert Baer, "Mughniyah is probably the most intelligent, most capable operative we’ve ever run across, including the KGB or anybody else. He enters by one door, exits by another, changes his cars daily, never makes appointments on a telephone, never is predictable. He only uses people that are loyal to him that he can fully trust. He doesn't just recruit people." He was described as "tall, slender, well-dressed and handsome ... penetrating eyes," speaking some English but better French.

"Both bin Laden and Mughniyeh were pathological killers," 30-year veteran CIA officer Milton Bearden said. "But there was always a nagging amateurishness about bin Laden—his wildly hyped background, his bogus and false claims. … Bin Laden cowered and hid. Mughniyeh spent his life giving us the finger."

Nasrallah also stated that, "Hajj Imad is among the best leaders and commanders in the Lebanese arena. He had an important role during the occupation [of southern Lebanon by Israel] by 2000. But as for his relationship with Hezbollah, we maintain the tradition of not discussing names."

According to his family, he was a dedicated father and had a reputation for modesty, respect and humility, to the extent that his neighbors in Syria thought he was a driver for the Iranian embassy. The man behind the stabbing of Salman Rushdie had a fake driver's license with the name Hassan Mughniyah, which suggests a mix between the forename and surname of Hassan Nasrallah and Imad Mughniyeh, respectively.

== Accusations and indictments ==
U.S. and Israeli officials have implicated Mughniyeh in many terrorist attacks, primarily against American and Israeli targets. These include the 18 April 1983 bombing of the United States embassy in Beirut, Lebanon, which killed 63 people including 17 Americans, among them seven CIA officers which included Robert Ames, the head of the Near East Division.

Mughniyeh was also accused of planning and organising the 23 October 1983 truck bombings against French paratroopers and the U.S. Marine barracks, attacks which killed 60 French soldiers and 240 Marines. While a student at the American University of Beirut (AUB) on 18 January 1984, Mughniyeh allegedly assassinated Malcolm H. Kerr (father of former NBA player/current coach Steve Kerr), the school's president. On 20 September 1984, he is alleged to have attacked the US embassy annex building.

The United States indicted Mughniyeh (and his collaborator, Hassan Izz al-Din) for the 14 June 1985 hijacking of TWA Flight 847, in which he tortured and murdered the U.S. Navy Seabee diver Robert Stethem. According to CBS Mughniyeh beat Stethem for hours, before killing him and dumping his body onto the airport tarmac.

U.S. and Israeli officials have also said that Mughniyeh was involved in numerous kidnappings of Americans in Beirut during the 1980s, most notably the kidnapping of Terry Anderson, Terry Waite, and William Francis Buckley, who was the CIA station chief in Beirut. Some of these individuals were killed by Mughniyeh directly, such as Buckley, who was subjected to extreme psychological and medical torture under the supervision of the psychiatrist Aziz al-Abub. The remainder were released at various times, with the last one, Terry Anderson, released in 1991. According to a former KGB agent in Beirut, on 30 September 1985 Mughniyeh organised the kidnapping of four diplomats from the Soviet Embassy in Beirut, one of whom he personally killed. The result of the kidnapping was Soviet pressure on Syria to stop its operations in Northern Lebanon in exchange for the release of the remaining three hostages.

Mughniyeh was formally charged by Argentina for his alleged involvement on 17 March 1992 bombings of the Israeli embassy in Buenos Aires, which killed 29, and of the AMIA cultural building in July 1994, killing 85 people. In March 2007, the Interpol issued "red notices" for his and others' alleged roles in the attack.

Mughniyeh planned the killing of Micha Tamir, the IDF general in Lebanon, and two IDF soldiers on 6 April 1992, according to the Israeli intelligence.

U.S. and Israeli officials have also said that Mugniyeh was the mastermind of the Khobar Towers bombing in 1996, which killed 19 American air force personnel and a Saudi civilian.

Israeli officials accuse Mughniyeh of orchestrating the October 2000 capture of three IDF soldiers in northern Israel, and of the kidnapping of IDF colonel Elchanan Tenenbaum. They also accuse Mughniyeh of overseeing the 2006 cross border raid that killed eight soldiers and abducted two during Israel's 2006 incursion into Lebanon.

== Organizational affiliation ==
In 2002, Mughniyeh was linked to the Karine A incident in which the Palestinian Authority was accused of importing fifty tons of weapons. He was a member of Force 17, an armed branch of the Fatah movement charged with providing security for Yasser Arafat and other prominent PLO officials.

In mid-February 1997, the pro-Israeli South Lebanese Army radio station reported that Iran's intelligence service had dispatched Mughniyeh to Lebanon to directly supervise the reorganisation of Hezbollah's security and military apparatus concerned with Palestinian affairs in Lebanon and to work as a security liaison between Hezbollah and Iranian intelligence. Mughniyeh also reportedly controlled Hezbollah's security apparatus, the Special Operations Command, which handles intelligence and conducts overseas terrorist acts. Allegedly, although he used Hezbollah as a cover, he reported to the Iranians. According to Jeffery Goldberg, writing in the New Yorker, "It is believed that Mugniyeh takes orders from the office of Iran's supreme leader, Ayatollah Khamenei, but that he reports to a man named Qasem Soleimani, the chief of a branch of the Islamic Revolutionary Guard Corps called Al Quds, or the Jerusalem Force—the arm of the Iranian government responsible for sponsoring terror attacks on Israeli targets." In January 2002, a US cable also stated that Mughniyeh left Hezbollah and got closer to Iran. However, Mughniyeh was a member of Hezbollah's jihadist council until his death in February 2008. After the July 2006 war between Israel and Hezbollah, he was assigned by Hezbollah to improve the military capabilities of the resistance in Lebanon; Damascus was his centre for this activity.

The European Union listed him as "Hezbollah's Chief of Staff".

== Arrest warrants and attempted assassination ==
Various law and intelligence enforcement agencies attempted to capture Mughniyeh. The United States tried to secure his capture in France in 1986, but were thwarted by French officials' refusal to arrest him.

The United States tried to capture him several times afterward, beginning with a 1995 US Delta Force operation that was put in place after the CIA was tipped off that Mughniyeh was flying a Middle East Airlines charter flight from Khartoum to Beirut after a meeting with several Hezbollah leaders, and was scheduled to make a stop-over in Saudi Arabia. Saudi security officers refused to allow the plane to make its stop-over, thwarting American attempts to arrest Mughniyeh.

The following year, the U.S. Navy planned to seize him from a Pakistani ship in Doha, Qatar, but the operation was called off. The plan, dubbed Operation RETURN OX, was carried out by ships and sailors of Amphibious Squadron Three (USS Tarawa, USS Duluth, USS Rushmore), marines of the 13th Marine Expeditionary Unit, and Navy SEALs assigned to the U.S. Fifth Fleet. The operation was underway, but was cancelled at the last minute when it could not be fully verified that Mughniyeh was on board the Pakistani ship.

On 10 October 2001, Mughniyeh appeared on the initial list of the FBI's top 22 Most Wanted Terrorists, which was released to the public by President George W. Bush, with a reward of up to $15 million offered for information leading to his arrest. The reward was later increased to $25 million. This reward remained outstanding as of 2006. Mughniyeh was on 42 countries' wanted lists.

The Israeli intelligence service Mossad made numerous attempts to assassinate Mughniyeh. His brother Fuad, a car shop owner, was killed in a 1994 Beirut car bombing, and another brother, Jihad, was killed in a car-bombing assassination attempt on the life of Hezbollah founder Sheikh Fadlallah in 1985, the work of the CIA via the South Lebanese Army. Israel planned to assassinate Mughniyeh when he attended the funeral of his brother Fuad, but he failed to show up.

== Assassination ==
The fire immediately after the car bomb went off

Assassination of Imad Mughniyeh
- Part of Hezbollah–Israel conflict and Iran–Israel proxy conflict
- Location: Kafr Sousa, Damascus, Syria
- Date: 12 February 2008; 22:20 (UTC+2)
- Target: Imad Mughniyeh
- Attack type: Car bomb
- Victim: 1 (Mughniyeh)
- Accused: Israel; United States

Imad Mughniyeh was killed on 12 February 2008 by a car bomb blast at around 23:00 in the Kafr Sousa neighborhood of Damascus, Syria. Mughniyeh was at a reception marking the 29th anniversary of the Iranian Revolution hosted by the Iranian ambassador to Syria, Ahmad Musavi. Mughniyeh left the party shortly after 22:30 and walked to his Mitsubishi Pajero. The spare tyre had been replaced by one with a high explosive, which was detonated as Mughniyeh walked past. The blast completely destroyed the car, left minimal damage to nearby buildings and killed only Mughniyeh. A Syrian government investigation found that he was killed by a car bomb that was parked nearby and that was detonated remotely.

Israel officially denied being behind the killing, but Mughniyeh reportedly had been a target of Mossad assassination attempts since the 1990s. On 27 February 2008, The Jerusalem Post reported that Al-Quds Al-Arabi had written that anonymous "Syrian sources" had claimed that "several Arab nations conspired with Mossad" in the assassination of Mughniyeh.

The U.S. Director of National Intelligence Mike McConnell suggested that it was also possible that Syrian intelligence was responsible for the killing. Ba'athist dissident and former Vice President Abdul Halim Khaddam stated in 2008 that Syrian intelligence orchestrated the killing of Mughniyeh under orders from the Assad regime. According to Khaddam, Assad's removal of Assef Shawkat as Syrian intelligence chief was due to Shawkat's investigation claiming that an explosion "had taken place inside the car" which went against the official line of Assad, which was that the death was caused due to "the explosion of a gas tank". Without naming a source, the German newspaper Die Welt wrote that a story had been circulated amongst German diplomatic staff that it was possible that associates of Shawkat had assassinated Mughniyeh. This would have been in revenge for Mughniyeh tipping off Assad about a coup plotted against him, which the Syrian government had foiled a couple of days before his assassination. Releasing the story in advance of going to print, Die Welt said the Syrian embassy in Berlin had rejected the coup story as utterly untrue. Lebanese politicians Walid Jumblatt and Saad Hariri as well as Mughniyeh's Iranian widow also accused Syrian officials. His widow, after returning to Iran from Damascus, stated "This is why the Syrian regime has refused the help of Iran and Hizbollah in the investigation of the murder... The Syrian traitors assisted in my husband’s murder." However, later she denied her statements. According to a leaked US official report, top Syrian officials were stunned by the assassination of Mughniyeh and engaged in an internecine struggle to blame each other for the breach of security that resulted in his death.

The Kuwaiti newspaper Al Rai reported that Hezbollah intelligence sources said they would retaliate for Mughniyeh's death by assassinating Israeli leaders.

Newsweek reported that in 2007 Mossad's director general, Meir Dagan, tipped the CIA off about the location of Mughniyeh in Kafr Sousa, Damascus. The two Mossad agents had the roles of monitoring his movements and confirming Mughniyeh's identity using advanced facial recognition technology, while the CIA officer later detonated the bomb. However, The Washington Post reported that Mossad detonated the bomb. The assassination was characterized as a significant security lapse and a notable intelligence achievement for Israel, sparking suspicions of potential betrayal within the Damascus regime, particularly given that the incident occurred in a zone housing security headquarters.

In 2024, former Israeli prime minister Ehud Olmert publicly acknowledged for the first time that Israel was responsible for assassinating Mughniyeh.

=== Reactions ===
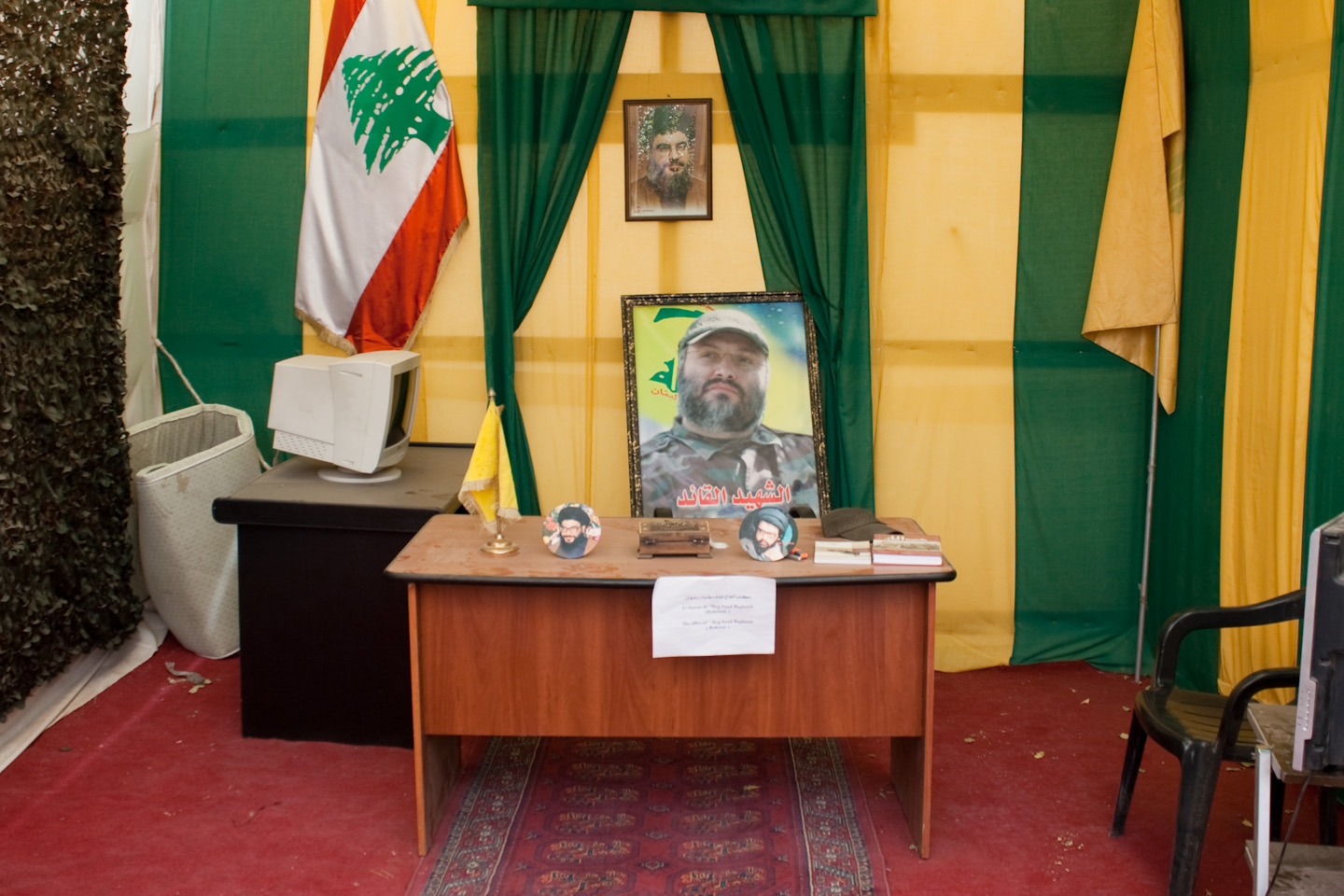
Memorial shrine in Lebanon

Mughniyeh's body was taken to Beirut and buried in Rawdat al-Shahidain Cemetery. A funeral was organized by Hezbollah on 14 February. Senior Iranian officials attended the service; Ali Akbar Velayati representing the supreme leader, Ayatollah Ali Khamenei, and Foreign Minister Manuchehr Mottaki representing President Mahmoud Ahmadinejad. At the funeral, Hassan Nasrallah appeared via video link and in the eulogy delivered for his fallen comrade, declared: "You crossed the borders. Zionists, if you want an open war, let it be an open war anywhere." Lebanese senior cleric Mohammad Hussein Fadlallah said that "the resistance has lost one of its pillars." Iran condemned the killing as "yet another brazen example of organised state terrorism by the Zionist regime" (Israel). A symbolic tomb was erected for Mughniyeh in the Behesht-e-Zahra cemetery of Tehran. Later the Iranian government named a street in Tehran after Imad Mughniyeh as well.

Israeli Prime Minister Ehud Olmert released a statement denying any Israeli involvement in the assassination. Danny Yatom, the former director of the Mossad, stated that he was not aware of who was responsible for the assassination of Imad Mughniyeh but regarded the operation as a significant achievement for the intelligence community. Yatom further noted that Mughniyeh was on par with Osama bin Laden, the leader of Al-Qaeda. Gideon Ezra, the Minister of Environment, Security Cabinet member, and former deputy head of the Shin Bet, voiced his approval of Mughniyeh's assassination. He referred to Mughniyeh as "the Lebanese Carlos," drawing a comparison to the Venezuelan terrorist imprisoned in France.

Then Italian Foreign Minister Massimo D'Alema termed the assassination "terror" in an interview, while Gideon Levy of the Israeli newspaper Haaretz claimed the assassination actually undermined Israel's security.

In the United States, the Bush administration welcomed news of Mugniyeh's death. A spokesman of the U.S. State Department said: "The world is a better place without this man in it. He was a coldblooded killer, a mass murderer and a terrorist responsible for countless innocent lives lost. One way or another he was brought to justice." Danny Yatom, former head of the Israeli Mossad said: "He was one of the most dangerous terrorists ever on Earth."

After Mughniyeh's killing, Hezbollah's elite Intervention Unit was renamed the Redwan Force after his operational alias Hajj Radwan (الحاج رضوان) in April 2008.

On the 10th anniversary of Mugniyeh's killing, Iranian Major General Qasem Soleimani, commander of the Quds Force of Islamic Revolutionary Guard Corps, described Mugniyeh as "the legend of our time," grief caused by whose loss was only second to that of Ruhollah Khomeini, the leader of the 1979 Iranian Revolution. Soleimani said that what made Mugniyeh unique was not his expertise in guerrilla warfare but "his attachment to something superterrestrial." Soleimani stressed that "the enemy must recognize that avenging Mughniyah's death won't be fulfilled by launching a missile or killing someone in response, but bloods like these will be only avenged by full destruction of the Zionist regime" which he said was "a definite Divine promise."

== See also ==
- 2000–06 Shebaa Farms conflict
- List of assassinated Lebanese people
