= Mohammad Ali Allahdadi =

Iranian military personnel

Sardar Shahid Mohammad-Ali Allahdadi محمدعلی الله‌دادی
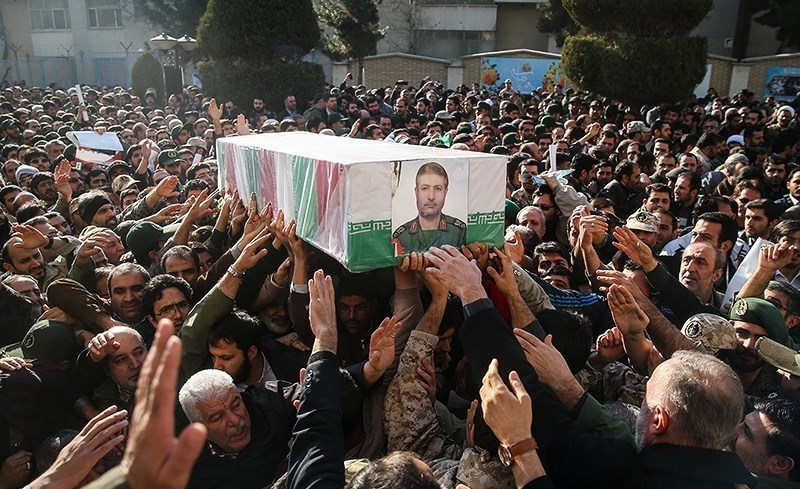
- Born: Mohammad-Ali Allahdadi c.1963 Pariz, Kerman Province, Iran
- Died: January 18, 2015 (aged 52) al-Amal Farms, Quneitra District, Syria
- Military career
- Allegiance: Revolutionary Guards
- Service years: 1980–2015
- Rank: Second Brigadier General
- Units: IRGC Ground Forces; Quds Force
- Commands: Mortar Platoon, 41st Sarallah Division of Kerman; Equipment Battalion, 41st Sarallah Division of Kerman; Sirjan Headquarters; 2nd Sahib-az-Zaman Brigade (deputy); 3rd Zulfiqar Brigade (deputy); 18th Alghadir Brigade/Division of Yazd; 3rd Muhammad Rasulullah Brigade/Division of Tehran
- Conflicts: Iran–Iraq War; Operation Tariq al-Qods; Operation Badr; Operation Dawn 8; Operation Karbala-4; Siege of Basra; Operation Dawn 10; Balochistan conflict; Syrian Civil War

Mohammad-Ali Allahdadi (Persian: محمدعلی الله‌دادی; c.1963 – January 18, 2015) was an Iranian brigadier general in the Islamic Revolutionary Guard Corps and a military officer in the Quds Force.

A veteran of Iran–Iraq War, he was killed in January 2015 Mazraat Amal incident.

== Military career ==
=== Iran–Iraq War ===
Still a teenager, Allahdadi joined Irregular Warfare Headquarters, an irregular warfare unit under command of Mostafa Chamran, as a guerrilla fighter. After fighting in Operation Tariq al-Qods, he moved to the IRGC Ground Forces' 41st Sarallah Division of Kerman as Lieutenant Colonel, under Qasem Soleimani. During the war, he was promoted to Colonel.

=== Balochistan conflict ===
He was also involved in the Balochistan conflict.

=== Syrian Civil War ===
In circa 2012, he was asked by previous Major General Qasem Soleimani to serve in Syrian Civil War. Allahdadi had traveled to Syria to "provide consultation" and was an adviser to the Syrian army.

He was killed in January 2015 Mazraat Amal incident, alongside six Hezbollah Fighters. Following his death, the Revolutionary Guard released a statement saying "Zionists should await devastating thunder of the IRGC" and Iran's Ministry of Foreign Affairs sent a "warning letter" to Israel via United States.

A senior Israeli security source told Reuters "Israeli forces believed they were attacking only low-ranking Hezbollah members". Officially, Israel has not commented on the attack.

Ten days after his death, Hezbollah launched an attack on an Israeli military convoy in the Shebaa Farms area.

== Legacy ==
2015 Southern Syria offensive was code-named "Allahdadi for Quneitra Martyrs".
