= 2005 Hezbollah cross-border raid =

Coordinates: 33°16′28″N 35°37′25″E

- Part of the 2000–2006 Shebaa Farms conflict, Hezbollah–Israel conflict, Israeli–Lebanese conflict, and the Iran–Israel proxy conflict
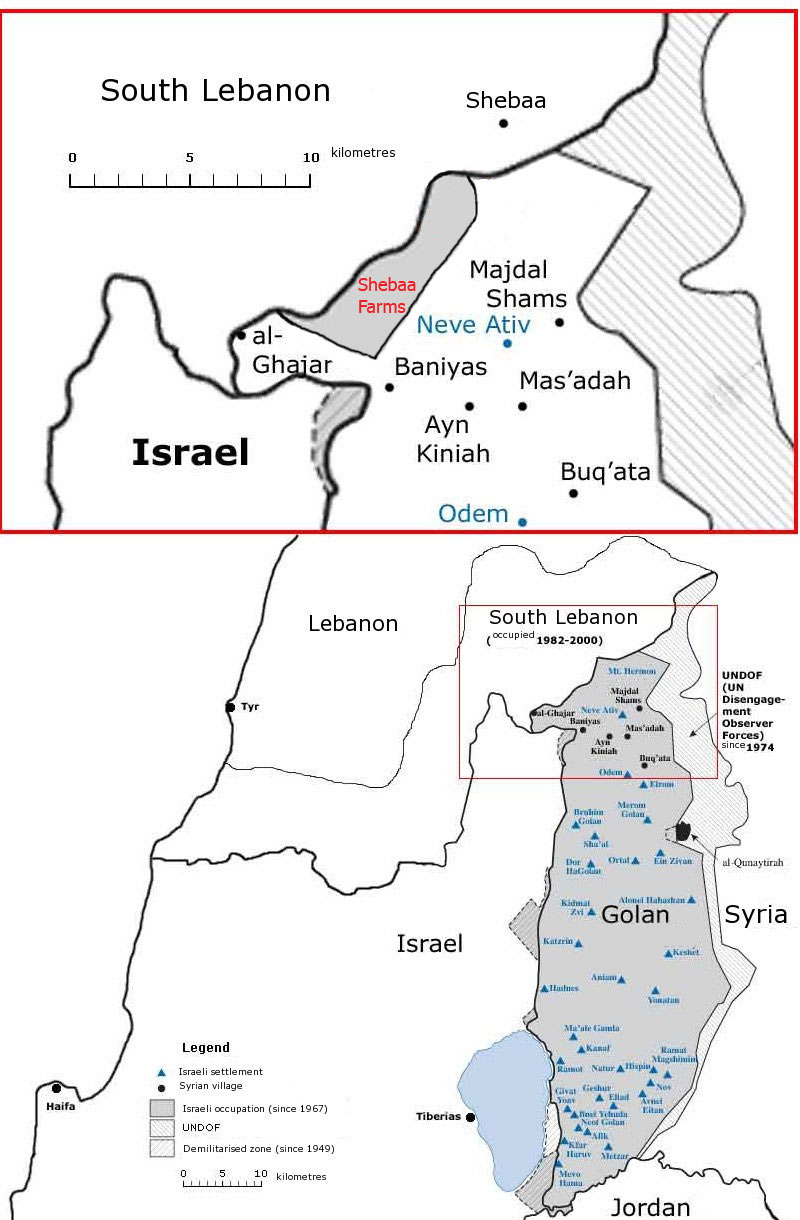
- Map of Ghajar and surrounding areas.
Date	November 21, 2005
Location	Ghajar, Golan Heights / Lebanon
Result	Israeli victory

Belligerents
Israel	Hezbollah

Commanders and leaders
(Israel) Gal Hirsch	(Hezbollah) Muhammad Qanso (Sajid ad-Duwayr)

Strength
Units from Paratrooper and Golani Brigades	Special Force units

Casualties and losses
7 soldiers wounded 4 civilians wounded	4 fighters killed

The 2005 Hezbollah cross-border raid was a failed attempt by Hezbollah to abduct Israel Defense Forces (IDF) soldiers. It was the largest operation of this type mounted prior to the 2006 Lebanon War.

== Background ==
In 2000, Hezbollah mounted a successful cross-border raid. Three Israeli soldiers: Adi Avitan, Benyamin Avraham, and Omar Sawaid were killed, and their bodies were captured. Israel released 30 Lebanese and Arab prisoners, 435 Palestinian prisoners, and the bodies of 59 Hezbollah fighters and Lebanese civilians in exchange for the remains of the three soldiers, and kidnapped Israeli reserve colonel and businessman Elchanan Tenenbaum.

Following the withdrawal of Israeli forces from the Shebaa farms security zone in Southern Lebanon that same year, Hezbollah fighters repeatedly infiltrated into Israeli territory to abduct IDF soldiers, and exchange them for Hezbollah and Palestinian prisoners being held in Israel. In June 2005, a unit of the Israeli Paratroopers Brigade patrolling the border identified three Lebanese it identified as members of Hezbollah's "Special Force", and opened fire, killing one. Hezbollah then mounted two more unsuccessful attacks against Israeli border patrols.

== Raid ==
On 21 November 2005, Hezbollah Special Forces launched a two-pronged attack against Israeli outposts in the Israeli-occupied Shebaa farms area. A Force consisting of 30 Hizbullah fighters attacked the Gladiola outpost, which may have been a diversion maneuver. Several Israeli soldiers in the outpost, including the company commander, were injured. Hezbollah also open mortar fire on 25 military installations from Rosh Hanikra to Har Dov.

Hizbullah fired more than 300 missiles against armored vehicles and other targets. The commanding Israeli officer Udi Adam said in his after-action report, that "it was the first time that Hezbollah used its entire tactical arsenal". Hizbollah used for the first time the advanced RPG-29 and AT-14 Kornet missiles. Two Merkava Mark-2 tanks were hit. One of the tanks was damaged but none of them was penetrated.

Meanwhile, another 20 Hezbollah fighters using motorcycles and ATVs attacked a military outpost in the border village of Ghajar, with the aim of capturing IDF prisoners. The attack was led by Hizbullah commander Muhammed Qanso (Sajid ad-Duweir), who later died in the Battle of Bint Jbeil. A Paratrooper marksman, 20-year-old Corporal David Markovitch, hit a rocket-propelled grenade being carried by the Hezbollah fighters, killing three, then shot and killed a fourth fighter. Corporal Markovitch and his family received a large amount of media attention in Israel following the incident.

Israel responded with air and artillery strikes onto Hezbollah positions in Lebanon. Israeli forces also demolished numerous Hezbollah outposts on the Lebanese half of Ghajar, and exchanged fire with Hezbollah fighters.

== Aftermath ==
Israel agreed to hand over the bodies of the three slain Hezbollah soldiers, who had remained on Israeli-occupied territory, to the Red Cross. "The bodies were returned as a confidence-building gesture to create calm along the Israel-Lebanon border," an IDF source said.

At a ceremony in Beirut, marking the handover of the bodies, Hizbullah Secretary-General Hassan Nasrallah said: "Our experience with the Israelis shows that if you want to regain detainees or prisoners ... you have to capture Israeli soldiers."

"It is not a shame, a crime or a terrorist act. It is our right and our duty which one day we might fulfill," he declared.

Hezbullah and Iranian experts later carefully examined the videos of these attacks, searching for possible weaknesses in the Merkava armor.

In July 2006, Hezbollah fighters attacked two Israeli armored Humvees patrolling the border, killing five Israeli soldiers. Two of the bodies were captured. A further five Israeli soldiers were killed in a failed rescue attempt. Israel responded with air and artillery strikes, a naval and aerial blockade, and a ground invasion of Southern Lebanon, while Hezbollah responded by firing rockets into Israel, and engaged the Israelis in guerilla warfare from hardened positions. Israel eventually agreed to exchange six prisoners, and the bodies of about 200 Hezbollah and Palestinian militants, for the bodies of the two soldiers.

== See also ==
- Israeli–Lebanese conflict
- Iran–Israel proxy conflict
- 2000 Hezbollah cross-border raid
- 2006 Hezbollah cross-border raid
- 2006 Lebanon War
- United Nations Security Council Resolution 425
- United Nations Interim Force in Lebanon
- Israeli prisoner exchanges
- Israeli MIAs
