= Tayr Debba =

Tayr Debba طير دبّا
- Municipality
- Location within Lebanon
- Coordinates: 33°16′27″N 35°16′43″E
- Grid position: 176/297 PAL
- Country: Lebanon
- Governorate: South
- District: Tyre

Area
  - Total: 2.23 sq mi (5.78 km^{2})
- Elevation: 660 ft (200 m)
- Highest elevation: 1,380 ft (420 m)
- Time zone: GMT +3

Tayr Debba (Levantine Arabic: طير دبّا, romanized: Ṭayr Debbā) is a municipality in the Tyre District in the South Governorate of Lebanon, located 7 kilometres east of Tyre and 88 kilometers south of Beirut. Its total land area consists of 578 hectares and its average elevation is 200 meters above sea level. There are two schools, one public and the other private, in Tayr Debba which collectively enrolled a total of 607 students in 2006.

== Etymology ==
According to E. H. Palmer, Teir Dubbeh means "the fortress of the bear".

== History ==
In 1881, the PEF's Survey of Western Palestine (SWP) described it: "A village built of stone, containing 250 Metawileh, situated on a ridge surrounded by olives and fig-trees and arable land. There are three cisterns in the village."

Tayr Debba is the hometown of the Hezbollah commander Imad Mughniyeh, who was assassinated in 2008.

== Demographics ==
In 2014 Muslims made up 99.61% of registered voters in Tayr Debba. 99.57% of the voters were Shiite Muslims.

== Notable people ==
- Mohamad Haidar (born 1989), Lebanese footballer
- Imad Mughniyeh, former Hezbollah member
- Jihad Mughniyah, former Hezbollah member
- Ali Bahsoun, former Hezbollah member

== Bibliography ==
- Conder, C.R.; Kitchener, H.H. (1881). The Survey of Western Palestine: Memoirs of the Topography, Orography, Hydrography, and Archaeology. Vol. 1. London: Committee of the Palestine Exploration Fund.
- Palmer, E.H. (1881). The Survey of Western Palestine: Arabic and English Name Lists Collected During the Survey by Lieutenants Conder and Kitchener, R. E. Transliterated and Explained by E.H. Palmer. Committee of the Palestine Exploration Fund.
