= Kafr Sousa =

Neighborhood in Damascus, Syria

Kafr Sousa كَفْر سُوسَة
- Municipality
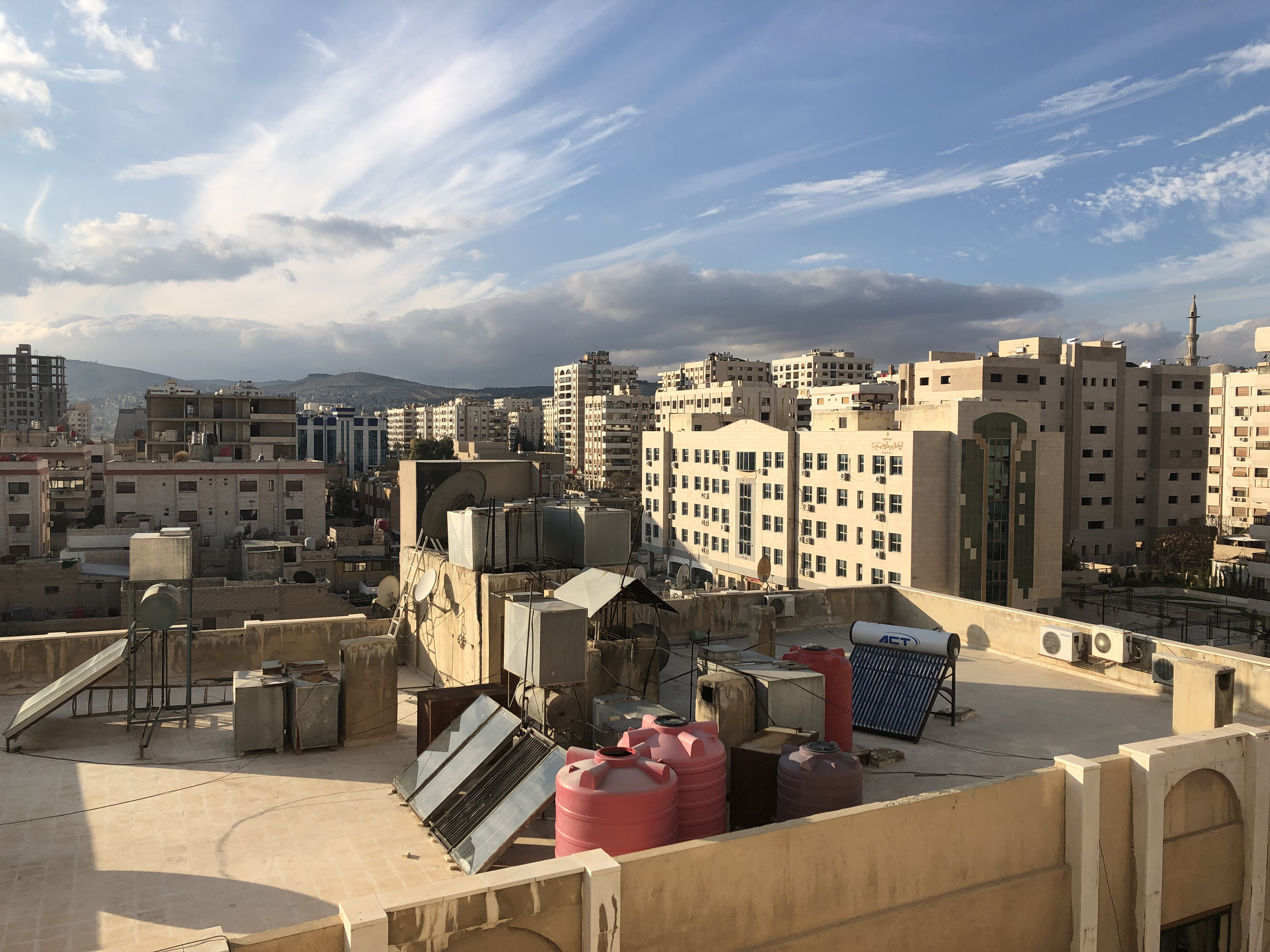

- Kafr Souseh on the District map of Damascus

- Location in Damascus Kafr Sousa (Syria)
- Coordinates: 33°29′54″N 36°16′38″E
- Country: Syria
- Governorate: Damascus Governorate
- City: Damascus
- Time zone: UTC+2 (EET)
  - Summer (DST): UTC+3 (EEST)
- Climate: BSk

Kafr Sousa (Arabic: كَفْر سُوسَة, romanized: Kafr Sūsah) is a municipality and neighborhood of Damascus, Syria, located in the southwestern part of the capital. It is home to the Syrian Council of Ministers and the Ministry of Foreign Affairs and Expatriates.

== History ==
The neighborhood was historically an agricultural suburb of Old Damascus. The word "Kafr" (Classical Syriac: ܟܦܪ) means 'farm', and "Sousa" is derived from (Classical Syriac: ܣܘܣܝܐ, romanized: Sūsyā) which means 'horse', hence, the name collectively means 'Horse farm'.

Today it is one of the most affluent and modern neighborhoods in the city. It includes various styles of villas, apartment buildings, and condominiums. The neighborhood still has some farms and an old farmers market, as well as two shopping malls and several government/official buildings including the Ministry of Foreign Affairs. It is also in proximity to the original neighborhoods of Old Damascus.

Senior Hezbollah figure Imad Mughniyeh was assassinated in the neighborhood in 2008.

The neighborhood participated in the 2011 protests of the Syrian uprising. In 2011, two co-ordinated bombings killed 44 and injured 166 residents.

A park in honor of North Korean leader Kim Il Sung opened in 2015.

In February 2023, an Israeli missile strike hit a basement in the Kafr Sousaa neighborhood, killing several people.

== Gallery ==
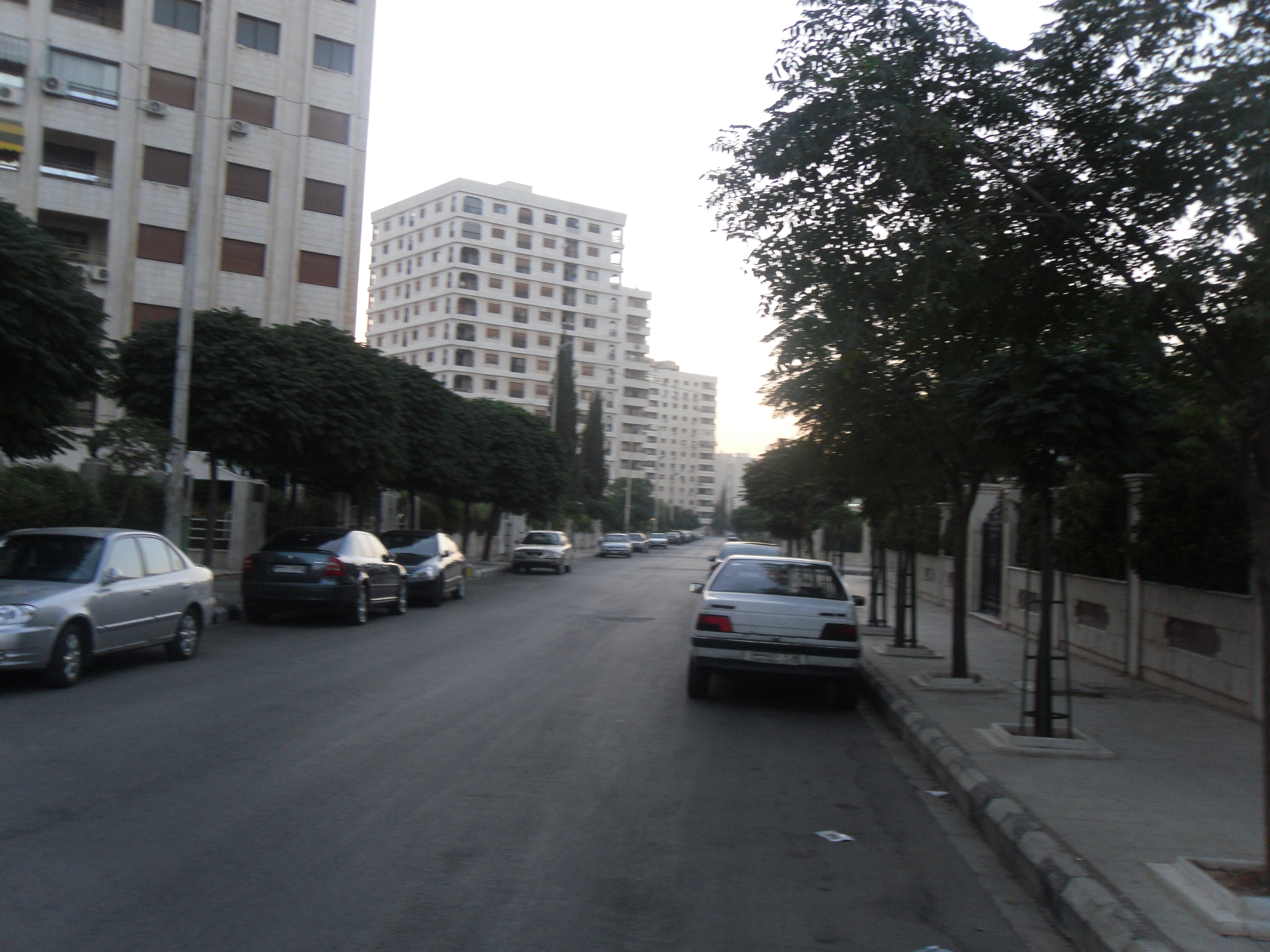
A street in the neighborhood

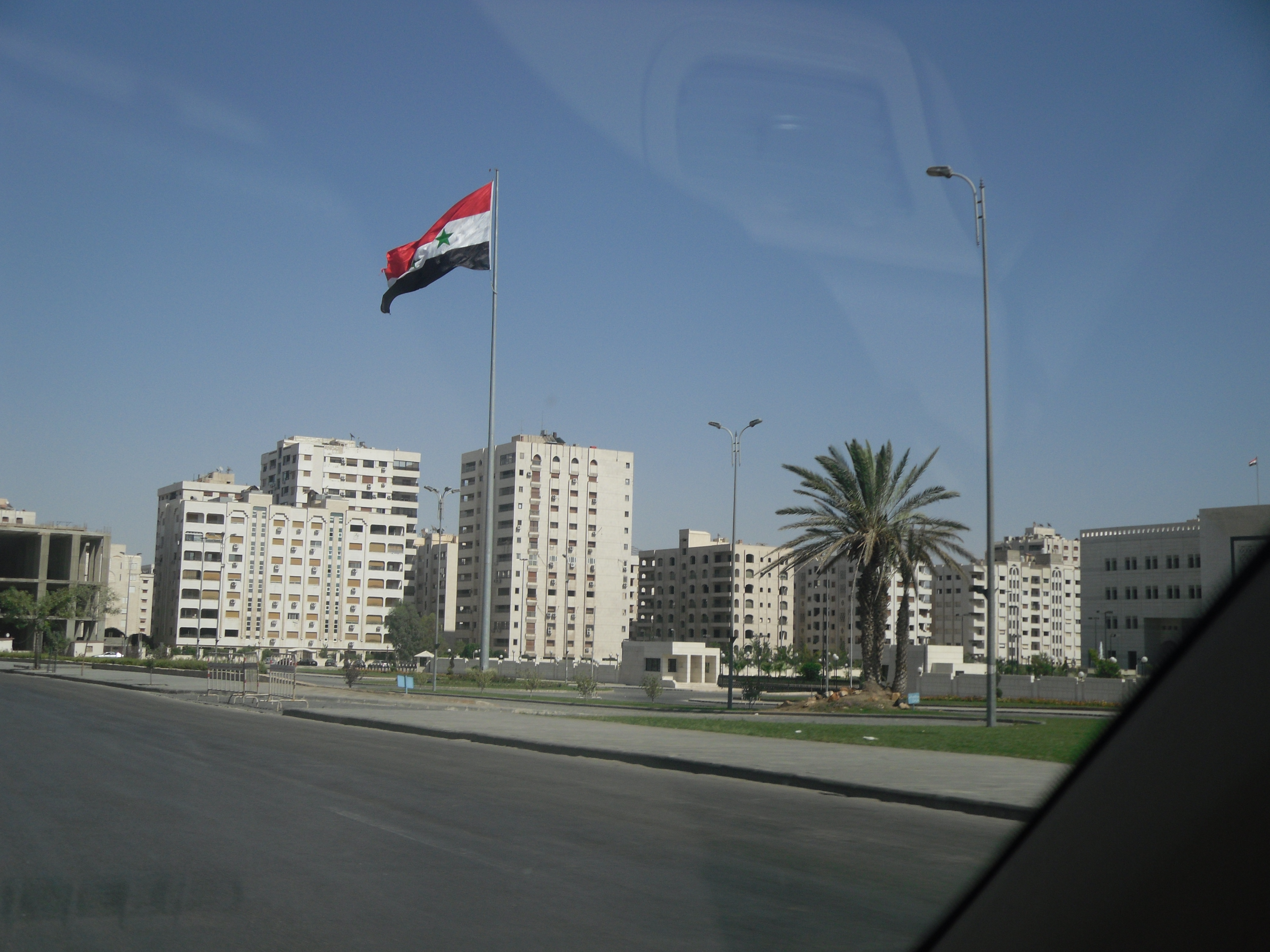
The Ministry of Foreign Affairs building.

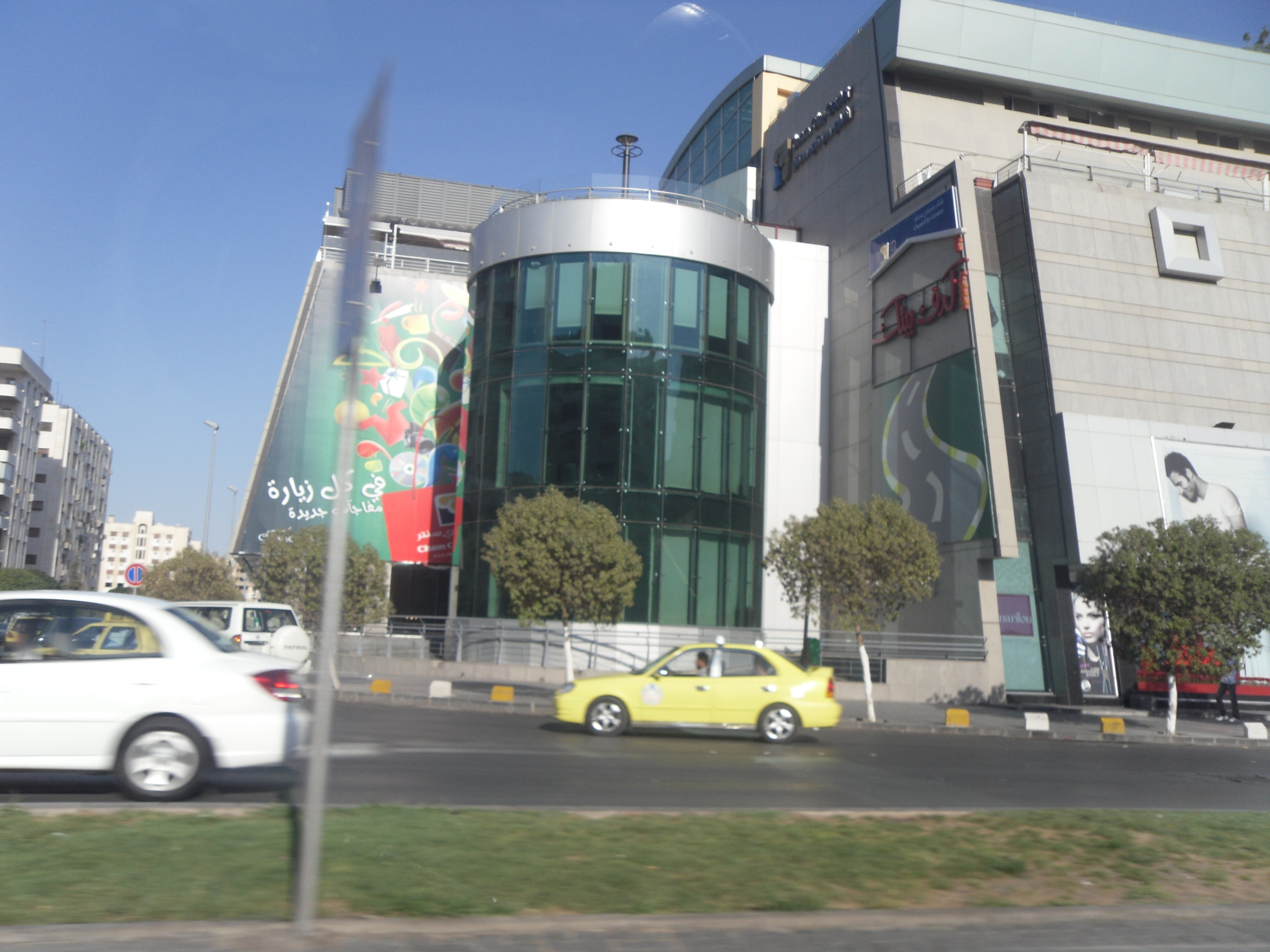
Cham City Center

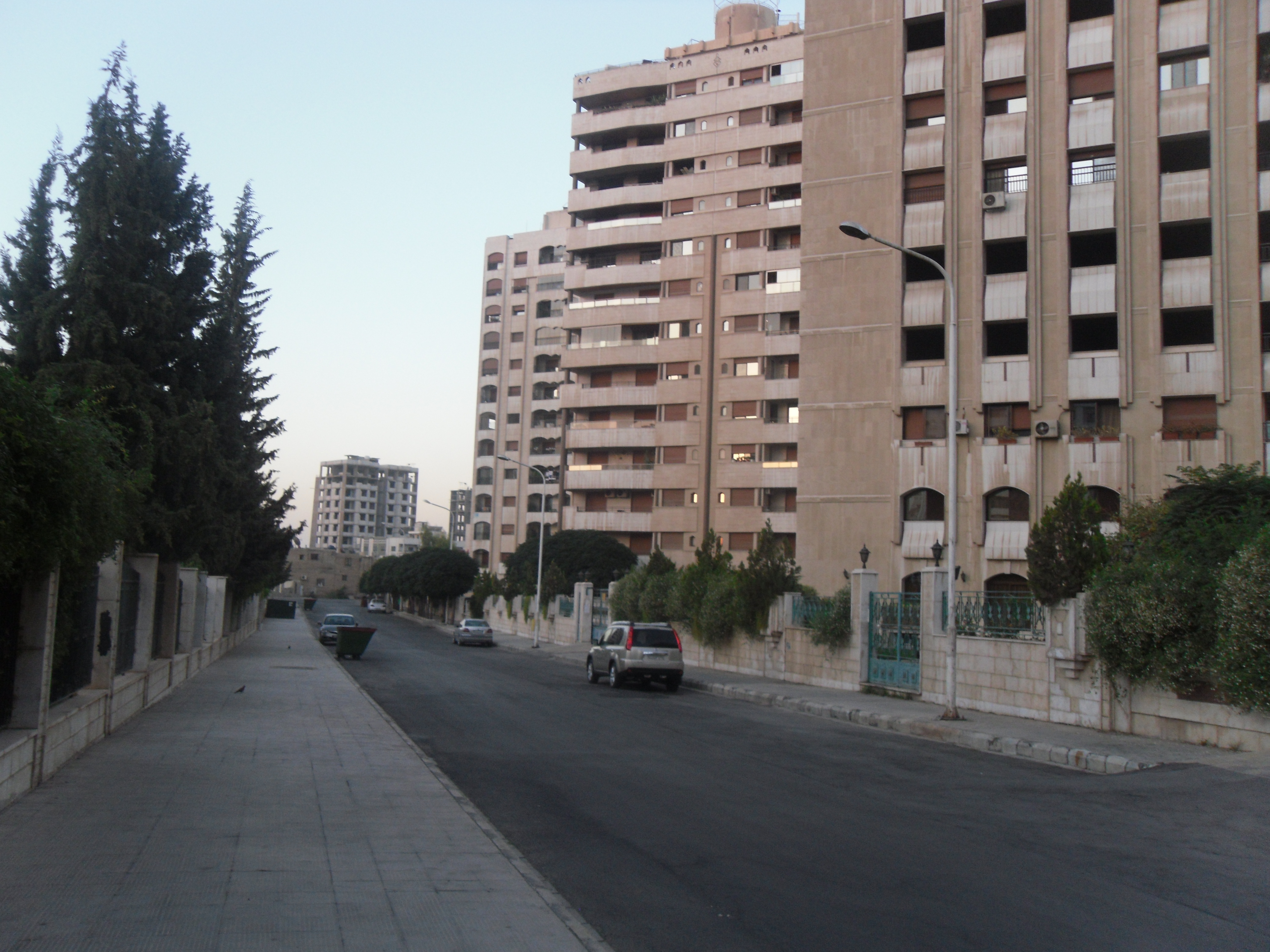
A street near the park
