= Jihad Mughniyah =

Lebanese militant (1991–2015)

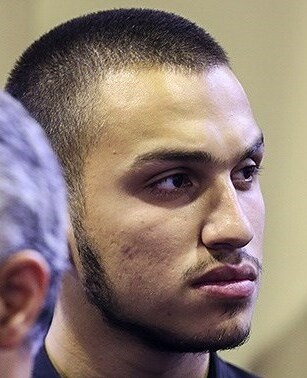
- Mughniyah in 2013
- Born: 2 May 1991; Tayr Dibba, Lebanon
- Died: 18 January 2015 (aged 23); Golan Heights, Quneitra Governorate, Syria
- Political party: Hezbollah
- Father: Imad Mughniyeh

Jihad Mughniyah (Arabic: جهاد مغنية; 2 May 1991 – 18 January 2015) was a Lebanese militant leader and prominent member of Hezbollah, and the son of Imad Mughniyeh. He was killed in 2015 in the Mazraat Amal incident, an airstrike attributed to Israel.

== Biography ==
Jihad Mughniyah was the son of Imad Mughniyeh and a member of Hezbollah, a Lebanese Shia Islamist organisation. He was born in Tayr Dibba, near Tyre, and was the third child of Imad Mughniyeh from his first marriage to Saedi Badreddine. Jihad had 5 more half-siblings from his father's other marriages; Israa, Hasan, Hussein, Foad, Zahraa. Jihad was studying business at LAU, but dropped out the last semester before graduation to continue working for Hezbollah.

In 1991, his family, without Imad Mughniyeh, went to Iran for security reasons. Later they came back to Lebanon and began their life in South Lebanon. Jihad Mughniyah became well-known in Iran by sharing his pictures of him standing behind Iranian military officer Qasem Soleimani in Soleimani's mother's funeral. In 2008, his father was killed in a car bombing in Damascus in what has been described as a joint Mossad-CIA operation. Mughniyah proclaimed his allegiance to Hezbollah's secretary-general Hassan Nasrallah a week after the assassination of his father, blaming Israel for the killing. Some sources says he was one of Hassan Nasrallah's bodyguards. He had also met with the Iranian supreme leader Ali Khamenei. Mughniyah was targeted in the bid to stop Hezbollah establishing a missile base in the Quneitra region on the border of Syria's Golan Heights.

== Death ==
On 18 January 2015, Mughniyah and five other Hezbollah fighters, including chief of Hezbollah operations in Syria Mohamed Issa, and several Iranian Revolutionary Guard Corps (IRGC) troops were killed by Israel in the Quneitra Governorate of Syria. The Israeli strike came days after Nasrallah promised retaliatory actions for Israel's military actions in Syria. Hezbollah retaliated on January 28 by firing anti-tank missiles at an IDF convoy on the Shebaa farms, killing two IDF soldiers.

While Mughniyah was not a senior leader in Hezbollah, his death was considered significant because he was the son of Imad Mughniyah. He was buried in Dahiyeh, Lebanon.

== See also ==
- Mustafa Badreddine
