= January 2015 Israel-Hezbollah incidents =

In January 2015 the Mazraat Amal incident led to retaliation in the Shebaa Farms incident.

The Mazraat Amal incident was an airstrike against a two-car convoy that killed six Hezbollah fighters, including two prominent commanders, and a general of the Iranian Revolutionary Guards (IRGC), Mohammad Ali Allahdadi, at al-Amal Farms (Mazraat Amal) in the Quneitra District of Syria, in the Eastern Golan Heights, on 18 January 2015, during the Syrian Civil War. The attack was largely attributed to Israel, which did not officially confirm that it carried it out. Hezbollah and IRGC held Israel responsible and threatened to retaliate. On 19 January 2015, Al-Nusra Front member Abu Azzam al-Idlibi claimed that Jihad Mughniyeh and the other Hezbollah fighters were killed in an Al-Nusra Front ambush at Jaroud in the Qalamoun Mountains in the Al-Qutayfah District northeast of Damascus, claiming that it "will be the end of the Persian project, God willing."

As a response to an Israeli attack against a military convoy comprising Hezbollah and Iranian officers on January 18, 2015, at Quneitra in southern Syria, the Lebanese Hezbollah group launched an ambush on January 28 against an Israeli military convoy in the Israeli-occupied Shebaa Farms, firing anti-tank missiles against two Israeli Humvees patrolling the border, destroying the two Humvees and killing 2 and wounding 7 Israeli soldiers, according to Israeli military. A Spanish UN peacekeeper was also killed by Israeli fire during consequent fire exchanges in the area, with Israel firing artillery and Hezbollah responding by mortar shells. The conflict ended later the same day after UNIFIL mediation.

== Background ==
Since the beginning of 2013, Hezbollah fighters have operated openly and in significant numbers across the border alongside their Syrian and Iraqi counterparts. They have enabled the Syrian government to regain control of rebel-held areas in central Syria and have improved the effectiveness of pro-government forces. Since 2013 Hezbollah has been pitted against al Qaeda-linked jihadists who have flocked to Syria from across the Muslim world.

During the Syrian Civil War, Hezbollah has had an increasing presence in southern Syria. Israel was accused of launching several airstrikes against Hezbollah and Syrian Army targets in southern Syria during the civil war, though it denied involvement. Hezbollah leader Hassan Nasrullah had warned that it would retaliate against Israeli attacks against Hezbollah inside Syria.

== Mazraat Amal incident ==
January 2015 Israel-Hezbollah incidents
- Part of Hezbollah involvement, Iranian involvement in the Syrian civil war, Iran–Israel conflict in the Syrian civil war, and the Hezbollah–Israel conflict
- Location: al-Amal Farms (Mazraat Amal), Syria; 33.23°N 35.88°E
- Planned by: attributed to Israel claimed by Al-Nusra Front
- Objective: To destroy a Hezbollah field unit
- Date: 18 January 2015
- Executed by: attributed to IAF claimed by Al-Nusra Front
- Outcome: Hezbollah group and accompanying Iranian general killed
- Casualties: Six Hezbollah fighters killed, including Jihad Mughniyah and field commander Mohamad Issa; Brig. Gen. Mohammad Ali Allahdadi

On January 18, 2015, an airstrike was launched against a convoy, killing six Hezbollah militants, including two prominent members and Iranian Revolutionary Guards general Mohammad Ali Allahdadi, at al-Amal Farms (Mazraat Amal) in the Quneitra District of Syria, in the Golan Heights. Hezbollah and IRGC held Israel responsible and threatened to retaliate. Amid official Israeli silence, a flurry of statements from anonymous Israeli officials made contradictory claims, one saying that Israel believed it was attacking only low-ranking Hezbollah militants planning an attack on Israelis at the frontier fence. One Israeli official reportedly apologised anonymously.

Hezbollah said that one of their vehicles was destroyed and another damaged. Reports prior to the United Nations statement suggested an attack by an Israeli helicopter, but the later reports indicated it may have been by drones.

A United Nations spokesman reported that the United Nations Disengagement Observer Force (UNDOF) observed two unmanned aerial vehicles (drones) flying from Israeli-occupied Western Golan and crossing the Area of Separation buffer zone towards UN position 30 on the Syrian controlled edge of the zone, where they lost track of them. An hour later they saw smoke coming from position 30 but could not identify the source. Later they observed drones coming from the area of position 30 and flying over Jabbata, in the Area of Separation. The spokesman stated that this was a violation of the 1974 Agreement on Disengagement between Israel and Syria.

Amid official silence, a flurry of statements from anonymous Israeli officials has made contradictory claims. One said Israel had been unaware that an Iranian general was in the convoy. Another anonymous senior Israeli security source said Israel believed it was attacking only low-ranking Hezbollah militants planning an attack on Israelis at the frontier fence, and that it had no idea the party contained prominent Hezbollah members, and least of all an Iranian general. Alex Fishman wrote in Israel's Yedioth Ahronoth that "one official apologizes anonymously, the other official refuses to apologize anonymously. ... We are talking about a potential war and the heads of the state are playing hide and seek."

=== Casualties ===
Seven people were named as being killed. (Note: Some sources say six Iranians were killed, making twelve deaths in total, but only one Iranian has been named) The Hezbollah members were field commander Mohamad Issa, also known as Abu Issa, "Jawad" Jihad Mughniyah (son of former top Hezbollah commander Imad Mughniyeh), "Sayyed Abbas" Abbas Ibrahim Hijazi, "Kazem" Mohammed Ali Hassan Abu al-Hassan, "Daniel" Ghazi Ali Dawi, and "Ihab" Ali Hassan Ibrahim. The Iranian was Brigadier General Mohammad Ali Allahdadi (also spelt Allah Dadi), a member of the Quds Force of the Iranian Revolutionary Guard Corps, who was deployed to Syria to assist the Syrian government against the rebels in the civil war. Hezbollah's Al-Manar news channel said that the attack occurred during a "field reconnaissance mission" by Hezbollah.

Mohamad Issa was a 42-year-old from Arab Salim in the Nabatieh District of southern Lebanon. His father was Syrian and his mother Lebanese. He joined Hezbollah by the age of 15, and rose through the ranks and took a leadership in many battles with Israel, including the 2006 Lebanon War. He was said to be leading Hezbollah's operations in the Golan at the time of his death and was the only one officially identified by Hezbollah as a commander.

Jihad Mughniyah was 25 years old and a rising figure within Hezbollah. His father was top Hezbollah commander Imad Mughniyeh, who was assassinated by a car bombing in Damascus in 2008. His fathers' two brothers, one also named Jihad, were killed in car bombings in 1985 and 1994. His father had close ties to Iran and was said to report to Qasem Soleimani, the commander of the Quds Force. Soleimani was very close to Jihad Mughniyah after his father was killed, and reportedly adopted him as his son. Mughniyeh was close to Mustafa Badreddine, the military leader of Hezbollah and brother-in-law of his father. (Note: Assuming Jihad Mughniyeh's mother is Saada Badr Al-Din, then Mustafa Badreddine is his uncle.) Mughniyeh also had a close personal connection to Hezbollah leader Hassan Nasrallah. With his high-level personal connections with Iran and within Hezbollah, and the status of his father, Mughniyeh was known as "the prince" in Hezbollah, and many expected him to quickly rise within the organization to a position similar to that of his father. After Syrian rebels captured Tal al-Hara and seized documents in October 2014, a Syrian National Council spokesman said that Mughniyeh was serving as Hezbollah's Golan District commander.

Abbas Ibrahim Hijazi was a 35-year-old from Ghazieh in the Sidon District of southern Lebanon. His father, known as Abu Kamal, was a founding member of Hezbollah. Hijazi had been involved in the 2006 war and had fought with Hezbollah against Syrian rebels in Qusayr and Yabroud in Syria in 2014. He was married to a daughter of Abu Hasan Salameh, a Hezbollah commander killed by the Israelis in 1999. Mohammad Ali Hassan Abu al-Hasan was 29 and was from Ain Qana. Ghazi Ali Dawi was 26 and from Khiam. Ali Hassan Ibrahim was 21 and from Yahmar al Shaqif.

== Rockets from Syria ==
On January 27, at least two rockets from Syria hit the Israeli-occupied Golan Heights, and Israel responded with airstrikes and 20 artillery shells against Syrian army artillery positions. A senior IDF official held Hezbollah responsible.

== Shebaa Farms incident ==
January 2015 Shebaa farms incident Shebaa Farms operation (عملية مزارع شبعا)
- Part of the Hezbollah–Israel conflict and Iran–Israel proxy conflict
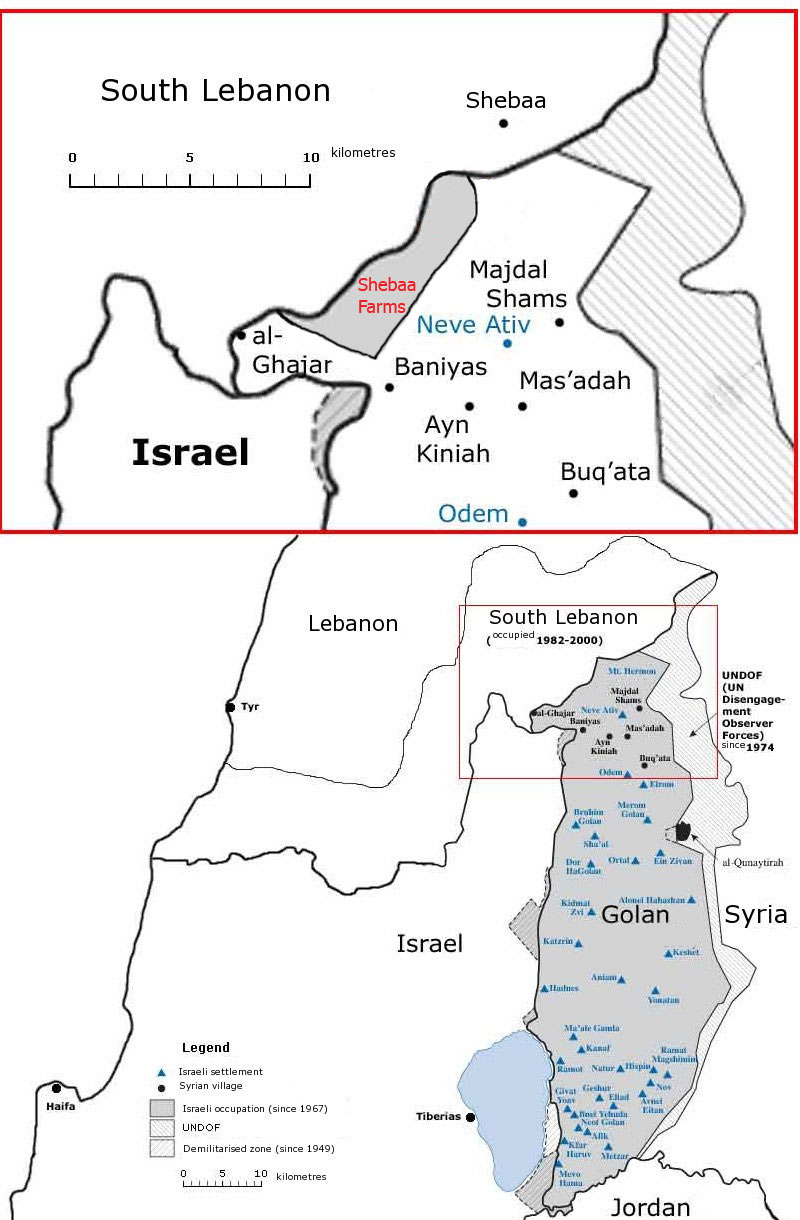
- Map of the Shebaa Farms
- Type: Ambush
- Location: Shebaa Farms, Israeli-occupied territories
- Objective: To attack an Israeli military convoy as a response to January 2015 Mazraat Amal incident
- Date: 28 January 2015; 11:25am (UTC+02:00)
- Executed by: Hezbollah
- Outcome: Successful
- Casualties: 2 Humvees destroyed 2 Israeli soldiers killed 7 Israeli soldiers wounded 1 Spanish UN peacekeeper killed

On January 28, 2015, at 11:25am (UTC+02:00), a Hezbollah unit, "al-Quneitra Martyrs' group" (مجموعة شهداء القنيطرة, a reference to the attack in Quneitra against a Hezbollah convoy), comprising five militants, fired anti-tank missiles (supposedly 9M133 Kornet) at two Humvees of an Israeli military convoy of 432nd "Tsabar" Infantry Battalion of the Givati Brigade in the Israeli-occupied Shebaa Farms near the Lebanon border. Hezbollah immediately issued a brief statement claiming responsibility for the attack. A Lebanese army spokesman later said the missile was not fired from Lebanese territory. The attacks killed two soldiers and wounding seven. In response, Israel fired at least 50 artillery shells across the border into southern Lebanon, in which a Spanish UN peacekeeper was killed.

Two hours after the initial attack, Israel fired at least 50 artillery shells into Shebaa Farms and the surrounding hills and South Lebanese border villages, and Israeli warplanes carried out mock air raids over the scene of the attack. Hezbollah responded with mortar shells against Israeli positions in the Shebaa farms area along the Golan Heights-Lebanon border.

Commander of the UNIFIL forces Major General Luciano Portolano called for restraint from all parties in order to prevent escalation. Shelling ceased around 2 pm, although Israeli warplanes hovered overhead.

=== Casualties ===
The Hezbollah attack on the Israeli convoy at Shebaa farms killed two and wounded seven Israeli soldiers, according to the Israeli military. The IDF identified the victims as Sergeant Dor Chaim Nini, 20, and Captain Yochai Kalangel, 25. Al Mayadeen satellite channel said that fifteen soldiers had been killed in the attack.

A Spanish UN peacekeeper, Cpl. Francisco Javier Soria Toledo, was killed by Israeli fire; Israel acknowledged this but said that it had no intentions to harm UN troops.

== Aftermath ==
Flights were suspended at the Israeli airports in Rosh Pinna and Haifa. In Beirut, celebratory gunfire could be heard the afternoon after the attack.

According to Robert Tait in The Telegraph, Israel stood on the brink of all-out conflict with Hezbollah by performing air and ground strikes against it in retaliation for the incident, though while things were tense neither side was interested in further escalation. No Israeli reserve soldiers were mobilized, thus indicating that an "all-out conflict" was out of the question.

Beginning in February 2015, Iranian and Hezbollah forces supported by the Syrian Government launched "Operation Martyrs of Quneitra" named after the combatants killed in the Israeli strike, with an aim of the offensive is the establishment of a Hezbollah controlled front against Israel.

== Reactions ==
- Israel – Defense Minister Moshe Ya'alon refused to comment on the airstrike, but noted: "If Hezbollah says their people were hurt in the targeted killing, let them explain what they were doing in Syria."
- Iran – Iran's Supreme Leader Ali Khamenei posted on his Twitter account rare "unseen" pictures of him hugging and kissing Jihad Mughniyeh and his father, Imad. And in a stern message after the attack, Iran's Islamic Revolutionary Guard Corps (IRGC) commander Mohammad Ali Jafari reaffirmed the organization's commitment to continuing the struggle against the "Zionist regime" until its destruction. Jafari said: "[...] The martyrdom of the members of the Ummah constitutes a further springboard for the destruction of the oppressive, satanic, and terrorist political system of the Zionist regime [...] The martyrdom again proved that we must not distance ourselves from the jihad and that the Zionists must prepare themselves for the "devastating thunderbolt" of Iran. A picture of Qasem Soleimani, head of the Quds Force, praying at Mughniyeh's grave was broadcast by Lebanese television channel Al-Mayadeen. He also met Hassan Nasrullah in Beirut 48 hours after the attack.
- Hezbollah – Hezbollah reportedly called the death of Jihad Mughniyeh "an unbearable blow." Hassan Nasrallah threatened to retaliate against Israel, stating the organization has "all (the weapons) you can imagine ... and in great quantities". in a speech after the January 2015 Shebaa farms incident, he said Israel had "planned, calculated and took a premeditated decision to assassinate" the fighters. He added that those killed in the attack showed a "fusion of Lebanese-Iranian blood on Syrian soil, and reflects the unity of the cause and the unity of the fate of the countries in the Axis of Resistance."
- Al-Nusra Front – On 19 January 2015, Al-Nusra Front member Abu Azzam al-Idlibi claimed that Jihad Mughniyeh and the other Hezbollah fighters were killed in an Al-Nusra Front ambush at Jaroud in the Qalamoun Mountains in the Al-Qutayfah District northeast of Damascus, claiming that it "will be the end of the Persian project, God willing."
- Iraq – Iraq's Vice President Nouri al-Maliki offered condolences to Hezbollah Secretary General Hassan Nasrallah and the families of the party's fighters "who were martyred in Zionist aerial aggression on Syria's Quneitra". In a letter, al-Maliki said that the martyrdom of Hezbollah fighters is considered as a great pride for them and for the Lebanese people and as a painful loss for all the honorable. "The Zionist criminals and vampires must know that the pure blood of the martyrs, like Jihad Imad Mughniyeh, will augment the resistance in face of oppression, corruption, and tyranny," the letter read. "I offer congratulations and condolences to the martyrs' families, Hezbollah glorious fighters and to you over this great martyrdom."

== See also ==
- January 2013 Rif Dimashq airstrike
- May 2013 Rif Dimashq airstrikes
- Quneitra Governorate clashes (2012–2014)
- April 2015 Qalamoun incident
- List of extrajudicial killings and political violence in Lebanon
