= Arabsalim =

Arabsalim عربصاليم Arab Salim
- Municipality
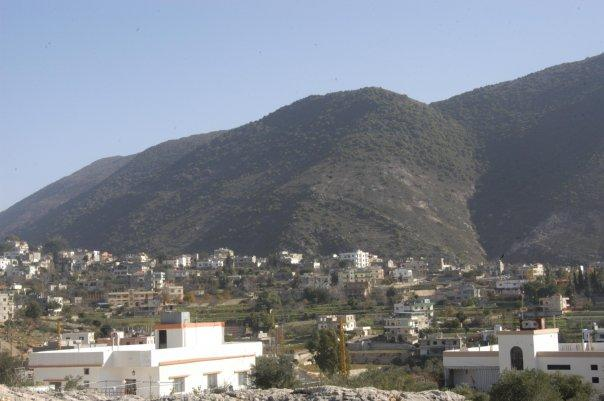
- Arabsalim, 2008

- Location in Lebanon
- Coordinates: 33°25′44″N 35°30′59″E
- Grid position: 129/165 L
- Country: Lebanon
- Governorate: Nabatieh Governorate
- District: Nabatieh District
- Time zone: UTC+2 (EET)
  - Summer (DST): +3

Arabsalim (Arabic: عربصاليم, romanized: ʿArabṣālīm) is a municipality in Nabatieh District, in southern Lebanon.

== Etymology ==
The town’s name, which comes from the Phoenician language, also appears in Pharaonic records as Rab Salim or "the god of peace." Found here is a shrine to the prophet Salim, which has important archeological significance.

== Location ==
Arabsalim is located 87 km from Beirut, at an altitude of 700 meters above sea level

== Demographics ==
In 2014 Muslims made up 99.59% of registered voters in Arabsalim. 97.98% of the voters were Shiite Muslims.

== See also ==
- Mohamad Issa (1972–2015), former Hezbollah member
