= Ghaleb Awwali =

Lebanese official

Ghaleb Awwali was a senior Amal Movement and later Lebanese Islamic Jihad official who was assassinated in a car bombing in Beirut, Lebanon in a Hezbollah controlled area, on 19 July 2004. Hezbollah blamed Israel and the Jund Al Sham organization as being responsible for the car bombing but offered no evidence. Others blamed Hezbollah itself, as Awwali had been active independently, and had been involved with Sunni Palestinian militant organizations. Hassan Nasrallah, the chief of Hezbollah, vowed to "cut the hand" of Israel, which he said was behind the killing of Awwali. Consequently, violent clashes erupted the next day on 20 July in response to Awwali's assassination between the Israel Defense Forces and Hezbollah, killing two Israeli soldiers and one Hezbollah militant.
