= Hezbollah–Israel conflict =

- Part of the Israeli–Lebanese conflict
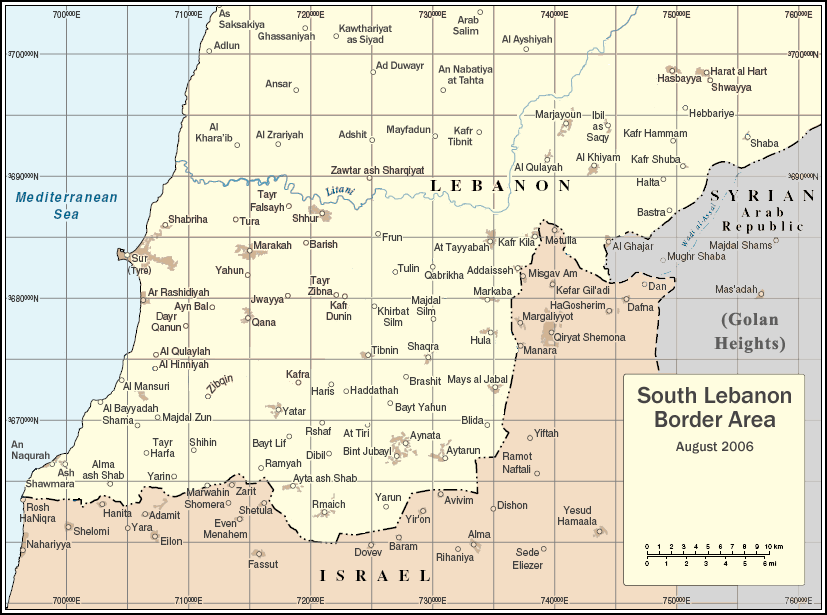
- Map of Southern Lebanon, where most of the fighting between the two belligerents took place
Date	1982–present (44 years)
Location	Israel and Lebanon
Status	Ongoing

Belligerents
Hezbollah	Israel Lebanon

Hezbollah, a Shia Islamist political party and militant organization that was established in Lebanon in 1985, has been involved in a long-running conflict with Israel as part of the Iran–Israel proxy conflict and the Israeli–Lebanese conflict.

== History ==
The two sides' first engagement occurred during the Lebanese Civil War, as Iran became increasingly involved in Lebanon's internal affairs. With funding from the Iranian government and training and supervision from Iran's Islamic Revolutionary Guard Corps, Hezbollah was built up in Syrian-occupied Lebanon by various religious clerics amidst the 1982 Lebanon War, primarily as a Khomeinist force opposed to the Free Lebanon State and the Israeli occupation of southern Lebanon.

Hezbollah controls southern Lebanon and is supported and funded by Iran and serves as their proxy in regional wars. From the inception of Hezbollah to the present the establishment of a Palestinian state and the return of Palestinian refugees to what became Israel has been a primary goal for Hezbollah. Hezbollah not only opposes the government and policies of the State of Israel, but also each and every Jewish civilian who lives in Israel. Its 1985 manifesto reportedly states "our struggle will end only when this entity [Israel] is obliterated. We recognize no treaty with it, no ceasefire, and no peace agreements."

== Timeline ==
Engagements between Israel and Hezbollah are a part of the wider Iran–Israel proxy conflict, including:

- South Lebanon conflict (1985–2000), in which Hezbollah was the primary force opposing Israel and the South Lebanon Army
- 2000–2006 Shebaa Farms conflict, a low-level border conflict between Hezbollah and Israel
  - 2005 Hezbollah cross-border raid
  - 2006 Hezbollah cross-border raid
- 2006 Lebanon War, a military conflict between Hezbollah and Israel
- 2006–2023 isolated attacks
  - January 2015 Mazraat Amal incident
  - January 2015 Shebaa Farms incident
  - Operation Northern Shield (2018–2019)
- Israel–Hezbollah conflict (2023–present)
  - 2024 Lebanon electronic device attacks
  - 2024 Lebanon war
  - 2026 Lebanon war

== See also ==
- List of projectile attacks from Lebanon on Israel and the Golan Heights
- Israeli–Syrian ceasefire line incidents during the Syrian civil war
- Iran–Israel conflict during the Syrian civil war
