= Shebaa Farms =

Disputed territory in the Levant

Coordinates: 33°17′N 35°42′E

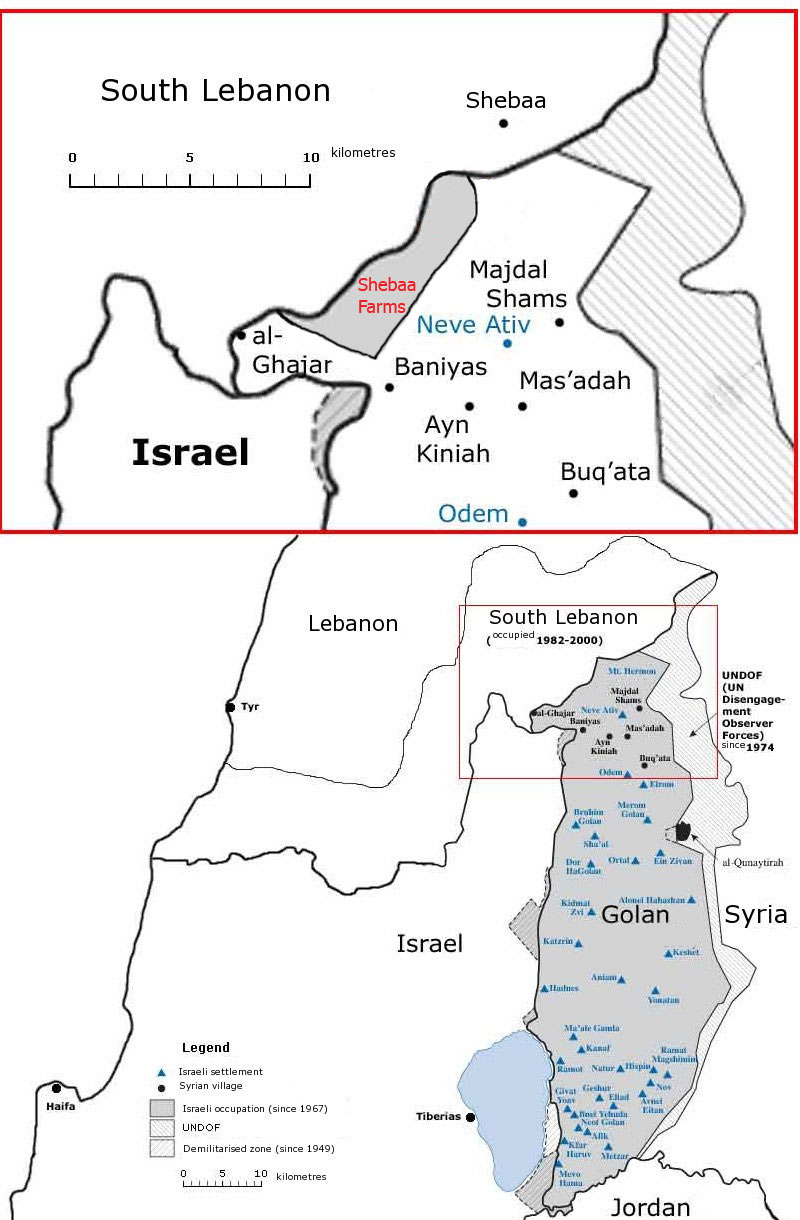
Map showing the location of the Shebaa Farms

The Shebaa Farms, also spelled Sheba'a Farms (Arabic: مزارع شبعا, Mazāri' Šib‘ā; Hebrew: חוות שבעא Havot Sheba‘a), also known as Mount Dov (Hebrew: הר דב, romanized: Har Dov), is a strip of land on the Lebanese–Syrian border that is currently occupied by Israel. Lebanon claims the Shebaa Farms as its own territory, and Syria agrees with this position. Israel claims it is part of the Golan Heights, Syrian territory that it has occupied since 1967 and effectively annexed in 1981. This dispute plays a significant role in contemporary Israel–Lebanon relations.

The territory is named for the farms within it which were historically tended by the inhabitants of the Lebanese town of Shebaa. It is about 11 kilometres (7 mi) long and 2.5 kilometres (2 mi) wide. The French Mandate for Syria and the Lebanon administration did not demarcate the border between Lebanon and Syria, nor was this done later by Lebanese and Syrian governments. Documents from the 1920s and 1930s indicate that inhabitants paid taxes to the Lebanese government. From the early 1950s to Israel's occupation of the Golan Heights in the Six-Day War, Syria was the de facto ruling power. In 1978 Israel invaded and occupied Southern Lebanon. In 1981, the Golan Heights, including the Shebaa Farms, were annexed by Israel, a move not recognized by the international community. Israel considers it part of the Golan Heights and continues to hold it, along with the Golan, under military occupation.

The territory has been a flashpoint for violence since Israel withdrew from Lebanon in May 2000. Hezbollah claimed that the withdrawal was not complete because Shebaa was on Lebanese – not Syrian – territory. Following the Israeli withdrawal, the UN certified the completion of Israel's pullout. Later the United Nations Secretary General issued a statement proposing the area for the operations of the United Nations Interim Force in Lebanon; in the statement the controversy was described, with 81 different maps being studied; the UN concluded that there is no evidence of the abandoned farmlands being Lebanese, but proposed to maintain the existing boundaries of the United Nations Disengagement Observer Force in Syria (which had included the Shebaa Farms since 1967) "without prejudice" to any future agreement between Syria and Lebanon.

Low-level conflict continued in the area from 2000 to 2006 and in early 2015.

== Geography ==
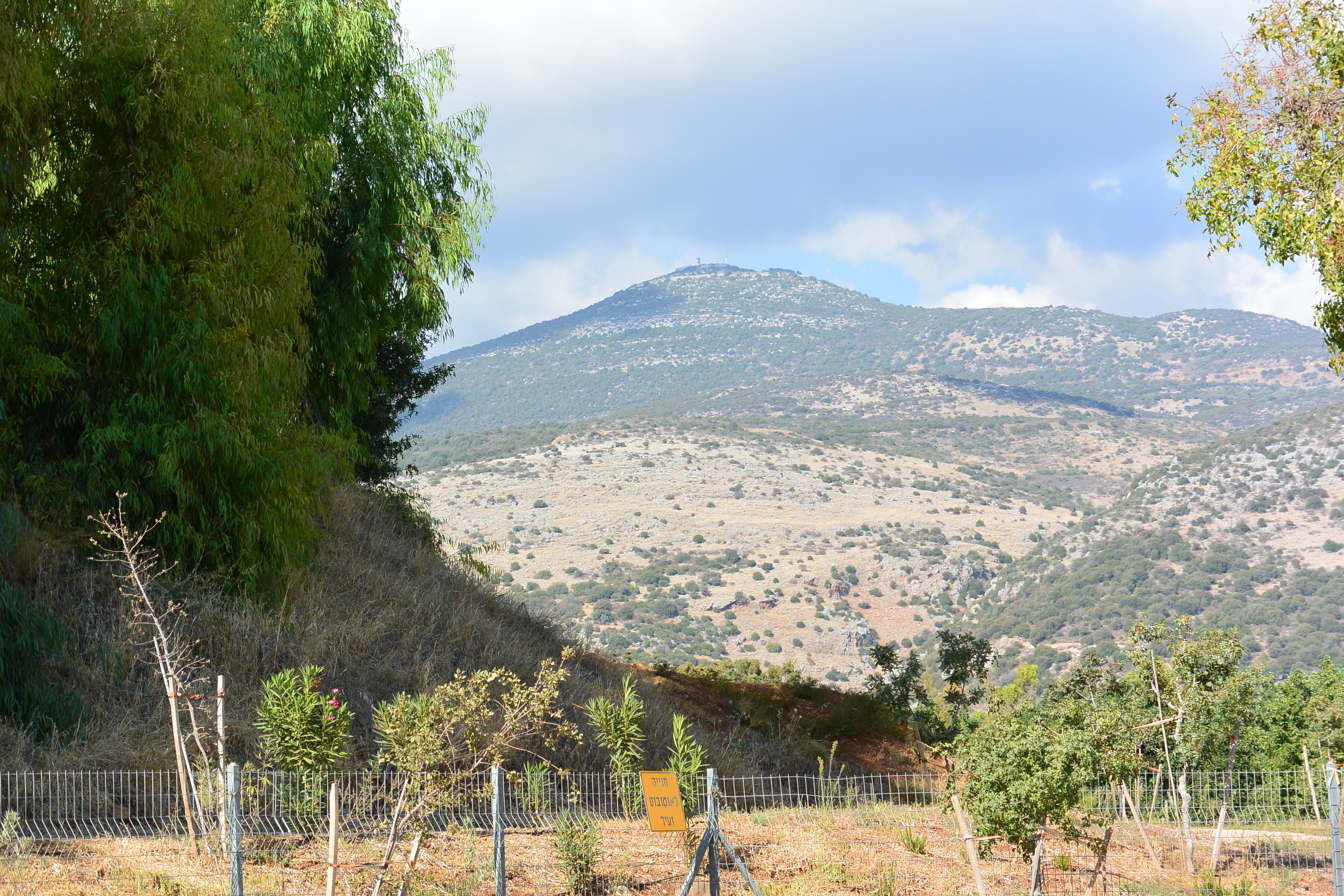
Shebaa Farms from Tel Dan

Shebaa Farms is an area about 9 km (5.6 mi) long, and 2.5 km (1.6 mi) wide; about 22 km^{2} (8.5 sq mi); 5,400 acres). The area contains 14 farms. Shebaa Farms is located about 3 to 12 km (1.9 to 7.5 mi) southwest of the Lebanese village of Shebaa, and about 5 to 7 km (3.1 to 4.3 mi) northwest of the Druze village of Majdal Shams. Shebaa Farms is on the southeastern side of a long, broad ridge descending to the southwest from Mount Hermon. The northwestern edge of the area corresponds to the international Lebanese–Syrian border recognized by the United Nations along that ridge. The southeastern edge follows Wadi al-Asal (Nahal Si'on), a 16 km long wadi that flows into Israel, draining a portion of the relatively precipitation-rich Hermon ridge in the northern Golan Heights. These "edges" are connected by the Shebaa Farms area's northeastern limit 2.5 km east of IDF military camp at Har Dov as defined by a 2007 UN report.

The same report defines the southwestern limit as a line roughly following the foot of the ridge and starting at just over a kilometer northwest of Banias, then running northwest to the international Lebanese–Syrian border's sharp turning point 3.4 km east of Ghajar and 1.0 km "south of the (Lebanese) village of El Majidiye." This southwestern limit of Shebaa Farms comes within about 1 km of the 1949 Armistice Line, international border between Israel and Syria. The only overland route between Lebanon and Syria south of the Mount Hermon ridge used to run between these two lines. The small farms in this area have not been used since the Six-Day War. The area includes heights overlooking parts of southern Lebanon and Israel to the west. Elevations range from about 250 to about 1,500 m (825–4,940 ft).

== Terminology ==
Lebanese press and officials often refer to the northern, higher part of the Shebaa Farms, just southeast of the Lebanese village of Kafr Shuba, as the Kafr Shuba Hills. The wide mountainous ridge in that part is called Jabel Rus (the mountain of the heads) in Arabic.

Israel refers to this northern, higher part as Har Dov (Mount Dov) after Dov Rodberg, an IDF officer killed there in 1970.

== History ==
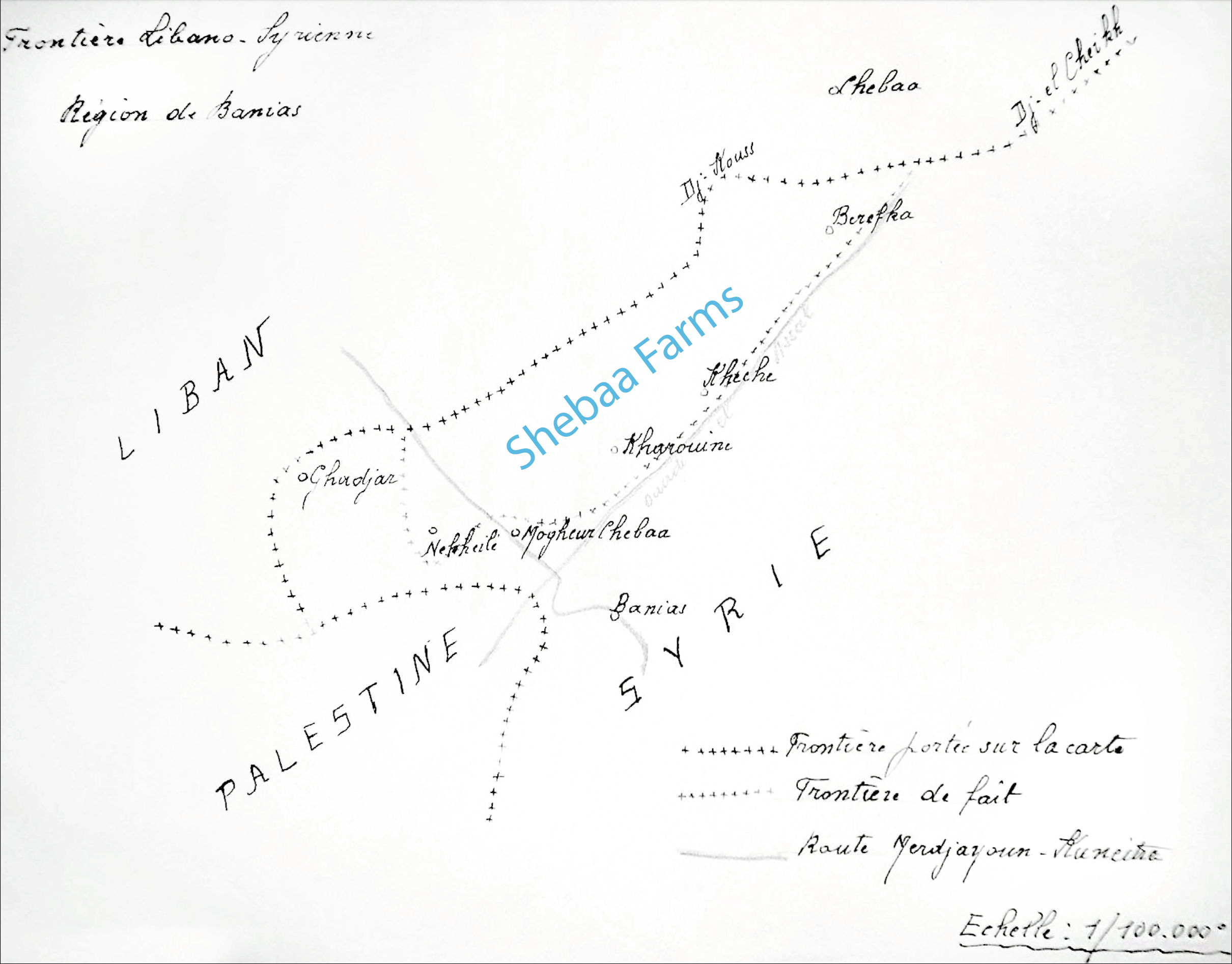
Sketch by government official Pierre Bart in 1937 showing a de facto boundary different from what appeared on maps

Documents from the 1920s and 1930s indicate that some local inhabitants regarded themselves as part of Lebanon, but after the French mandate ended in 1946 the land was administered by Syria, and represented as such on maps of the time, Syrian and Lebanese military maps. Shebaa Farms were then occupied by Israel in the 1967 Six-Day War. Syria accepts the Lebanese claim on Shebaa Farms, but refuses any binding demarcation.

When Israel captured the Golan Heights in 1967, Shebaa Farms was considered Syrian territory. Lebanon was not an active participant in the war. In 1981 Israel extended Israeli law to the region under its Golan Heights Law. The United Nations Security Council declared this extension of "[Israeli] laws, jurisdiction and administration... null and void and without international legal effect" in Resolution 497, which was not passed with Chapter VII enforcement powers.

A controversy arose following the withdrawal of Israeli troops from Southern Lebanon on 24 May 2000. On 18 June 2000, the United Nations affirmed that Israel had withdrawn its forces from Lebanon, in accordance with Resolution 425. Syria and Lebanon disputed the United Nations certification that Israel's withdrawal from Lebanon was complete. Hezbollah cites the occupation of Shebaa Farms as one reason for its continued attacks on Israel.

For decades the international diplomatic community has requested that Syria and Lebanon take steps to determine the exact boundary and officially register the demarcated border with the United Nations. Syrian President Bashar al-Assad has refused. On 31 October 2007, the definition of the physical extent of the Shebaa Farms area by former UN cartographer Miklos Pinther was released by the UN. This could be a prelude to an eventual negotiated demarcation of the territory. By October 2013, neither party had officially responded to the proposal.

=== Territorial dispute ===
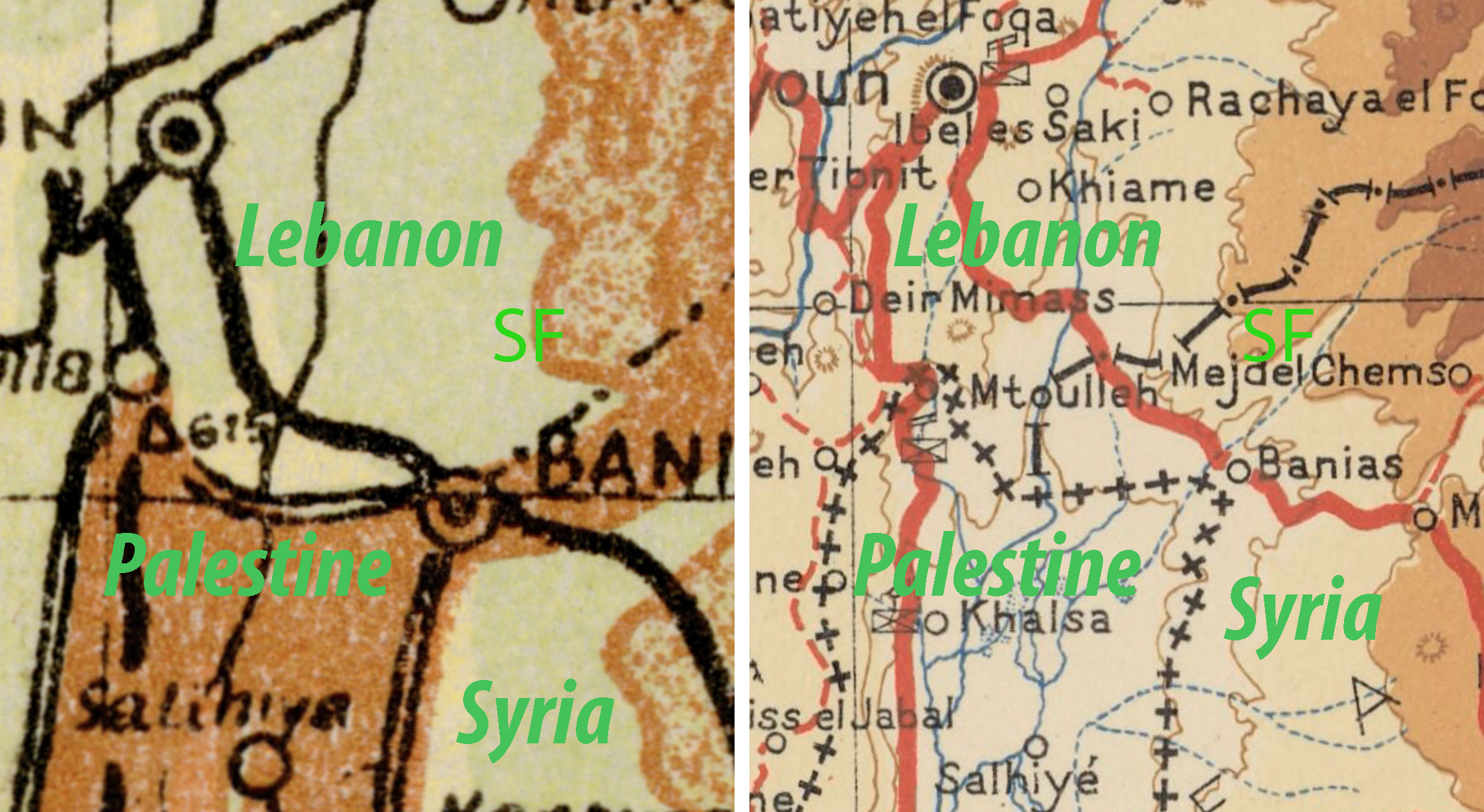
Maps from around 1930 showing different Lebanon-Syria borders. SF=Shebaa Farms

The dispute over the sovereignty of Shebaa Farms resulted in part from the failure of the French Mandate administrations, and subsequently the Lebanese and Syrian governments, to demarcate the border between Lebanon and Syria. Documents from the 1920s and 1930s indicate that local inhabitants paid taxes to the Lebanese government, while French officials expressed confusion as to the actual location of the border. One French official in 1939 declared that the uncertainty was sure to cause trouble in the future.

The region continued to be represented in the 1930s and 1940s as Syrian territory, under the French Mandate. Detailed maps showing the border were produced by the French in 1933, and again in 1945. After the French Mandate ended in 1946, the land was administered by Syria and represented as such on maps of the time.

Border disputes erupted from time to time, also with respect to land ownership in other border villages. Syria and Lebanon formed a joint Syrian-Lebanese border committee in the late 1950s to demarcate a border between the two nations. In 1964, the committee suggested that the area be deemed the property of Lebanon and recommended that the international border be reestablished consistent with its suggestion. Neither Syria nor Lebanon adopted the committee's suggestion, and neither country took any action along the suggested lines. Thus, maps of the area continued to reflect the area as being in Syria. Even maps of both the Syrian and Lebanese armies continued to demarcate the region within Syrian territory.

A number of local residents regarded themselves as Lebanese but the Lebanese government showed little interest in their views. The Syrian government administered the region, and on the eve of the 1967 war, the region was under effective Syrian control.

In 1967 most Shebaa Farms land owning farmers lived outside the Syrian-controlled region, across the Lebanese–Syrian border, in the Lebanese village of Shebaa. After the Six-Day War, the landowners were no longer able to farm it.

=== Operation Litani ===
In 1978 Israel invaded southern Lebanon in Operation Litani. The UN Security Council passed Resolution 425, calling on Israel "to withdraw forthwith its forces from all Lebanese territory". The phrase "all territory" was used in Resolution 425, in contrast to the language in Resolution 242 (1967), which led to semantic disputes.

On 22 May 2000, Israel completed its withdrawal from southern Lebanon in accordance with Resolution 425. The UN certified the completion of Israel's pullout.

=== Attacks by Hezbollah ===
Between 2000 and 2005, Hezbollah attacked the IDF at Shebaa/Har Dov 33 times, resulting in seven Israeli soldiers killed in action, three taken prisoner, and dozens wounded.

On 26 April 2024, an Israeli Bedouin truck driver was killed at Har Dov during infrastructure works as a result of an anti-tank missile strike by Hezbollah.

== Positions ==
=== Lebanon ===
In 2000, Lebanon disputed Israel's compliance with Resolution 425. Lebanon claimed that the Shebaa Farms area was actually Lebanese and demanded that the Israelis should therefore withdraw from there as well. Lebanon asserted that the UN certification of the Israeli withdrawal was "invalid", because of Lebanon's claim to the farms.

Lebanese officials point to land deeds, stamped by the Lebanese government, that were held by a number of area residents in the 1940s and 1950s. The Lebanese claim to this area is asserted by Hezbollah for its hostilities with Israel and its cross-border attacks after the Israeli withdrawal. Senior Lebanese officials also linked the withdrawal of Israeli forces from Shebaa to Hezbollah's disarmament. "If the U.S. and friendly countries help us achieve the withdrawal of Israel from Shebaa Farms, this would make it possible for the Lebanese forces to be the sole owner of weapons and arms in the country", Lebanese Prime Minister Fouad Seniora said. Those comments were echoed by Lebanese President Émile Lahoud who said that "the resistance should be kept until a just and comprehensive peace is achieved in the region", adding that "if the Lebanese army were deployed along the borders (with Israel) ... it would be turned into a police force to protect Israel's borders, and this is not acceptable."

Walid Jumblatt, a Lebanese Druze politician and leader of the Progressive Socialist Party, stated that Lebanon has no claims to the Shebaa Farms. The prime minister and president stated that Lebanon has a claim to the area. On 28 August 2006, Hezbollah fighters withdrew from positions facing Israeli occupation lines in the Shebaa Farms area.

In August 2008, the president of Lebanon, Michel Suleiman, stated: "The countdown for liberating the rest of our lands has begun. And today I confirm the [use] of all available and legitimate means to achieve this goal".

According to the Arab newspaper, Al-Hayat, "The issue over these farms was created to justify resistance operations from Lebanon after the UN had created the Blue Line following Israel's withdrawal from Lebanon. The Shebaa Farms were placed inside Syrian territory. Syria, which claims that the farms are Lebanese, has not presented a single document to the UN to prove it. Moreover, Syria refuses to demarcate its borders with Lebanon."

=== Syria ===
Syria has supported Lebanon's claim that the Shebaa Farms are part of Lebanon and not Syrian territory, at the UN and in official government press releases. But at other times it has made contrary statements. On 16 May 2000, the Syrian Foreign Minister, Farouq al-Shara, indicated to UN Secretary-General Kofi Annan in a telephone conversation that Syria supported Lebanon's claim. This was made public in the UN Press Release SC/6878 of 18 June 2000 which stated: "Concerning the Shab'a farmlands, both Lebanon and Syria state that this land belongs to Lebanon."

On 21 January 2006, President of Syria Bashar al-Assad spoke before the convention of the Arab Lawyers Union in Damascus which was translated into English by the Syrian Arab News Agency (SANA) He said there are two legal requirements for demarcating the border: first, the complaint must be registered with the UN; and second, engineers must precisely define the border. As neither Syria nor Lebanon have access to the area, Assad argues that resolution is waiting on Israeli withdrawal from the occupied territory.

In an interview with Assad reported by SANA on 24 August 2006, Assad flatly refused demarcation of the Syrian/Lebanese border near Shebaa Farms before a withdrawal of Israeli troops.

Former Vice President of Syria Abdel-Halim Khaddam, in an interview with the Lebanese Future Television on 27 August 2006, said: "Saying that the farms are occupied, and hence cannot be demarcated, is nothing but a pretext. The demarcation would not take more than an hour if there was a political will."

In a 28 February 2011 one-on-one meeting with an American diplomat, Assad declared that both Shebaa Farms and Kfar Shuba Hills were Syrian territory and not Lebanese.

=== Israel ===
Israel claims that the area is not covered by UN Security Council Resolution 425, which governed Israel's withdrawal from Lebanon, stating that the Farms were not Lebanese territory. In support of that view, Israel points to the fact that the UN certified Israel's pullout from Lebanon as having been completed.

Israel says the land was Syrian when it was captured during the Six-Day War, and the dispute is being used by Hezbollah to continue its attacks on Israel.

=== United States ===
John Bolton, in his capacity as United States Ambassador to the United Nations, said on 26 April 2006: "I think the overwhelming preponderance of the evidence is that Shebaa Farms is Syrian territory."

In an August 2006 op-ed for The Washington Post, former US president Jimmy Carter said that "Israel should withdraw from all Lebanese territory, including Shebaa Farms."

In June 2008, Secretary of State Condoleezza Rice visited Beirut, stating that "the United States believes that the time has come to deal with the Shebaa Farms issue ... in accordance with [U.N. Security Council Resolution] 1701."

=== UN ===
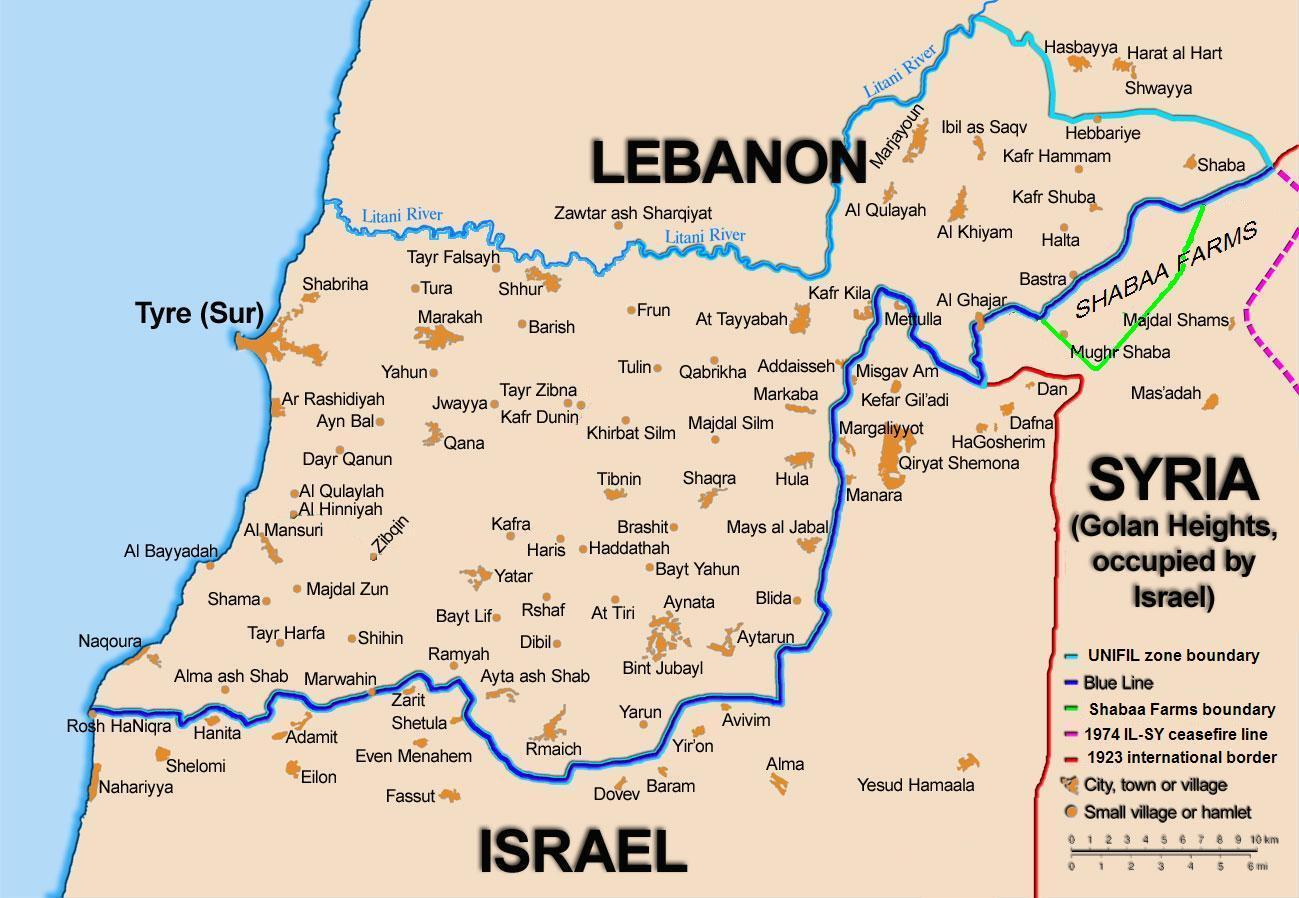
A map showing the Blue Line, a rough delineation of the Shabaa Farm area and the UNIFIL deployment area

The United Nations certified Israel's pullout under Resolution 425 as conforming to the "withdrawal line" it had laid down in accordance with the maps at its disposal "for the practical purpose of confirming the Israeli withdrawal". At the same time the UN noted that its decision was "without prejudice to future border agreements between the Member States concerned," referring to Israel, Syria, and Lebanon. The UN stated:

On May 15, 2000, the United Nations received a map, dated 1966, from the Government of Lebanon which reflected the Government's position that these farmlands were located in Lebanon. The United Nations is in possession of ten other maps issued after 1966 by various Lebanese government institutions, including the Ministry of Defense and the army, all of which place the farmlands inside the Syrian Arab Republic. The United Nations has also examined six maps issued by the Government of the Syrian Arab Republic, including three maps since 1966, which place the farmlands inside the Syrian Arab Republic.

In April 2002, UN Secretary-General Kofi Annan, said:

With reference to the disturbances along the Blue Line emanating from Lebanese territory, I call on the Government of Lebanon and all relevant parties to condemn and prevent such violations. The Security Council itself confirmed in June 2000 that Israel had withdrawn from southern Lebanon in compliance with UN Security Council resolutions 425 and 426. Attacks at any point along the Blue Line, including in the Shebaa Farms area in the occupied Golan Heights, are violations of Security Council resolutions. Respect for decisions of the Security Council is the most basic requirement of international legitimacy.

On 20 January 2005, UN Secretary-General's report on Lebanon stated:

The continually asserted position of the Government of Lebanon that the Blue Line is not valid in the Shab'a farms area is not compatible with Security Council resolutions. The Council has recognized the Blue Line as valid for purposes of confirming Israel’s withdrawal pursuant to resolution 425 (1978). The Government of Lebanon should heed the Council’s repeated calls for the parties to respect the Blue Line in its entirety.

The BBC quoted Timur Goksel, then spokesman for the United Nations Interim Force in Lebanon (UNIFIL) as saying that "no-one disputed that the village of Shebaa itself was in Lebanon, but most of the farms fell into an undefined area that may be either in Lebanon or Syria" and although the UN was not a "boundary marking authority [...] on all maps the UN has been able to find, the farms are seen on the Syrian side [of the border]."

In 2006, Terje Rød-Larsen, the UN special envoy on implementation of Resolution 1559, declared that "the Shaba Farms area is not part of Lebanon. Therefore, any Lebanese 'resistance' to 'liberate' the area from continued Israeli occupation cannot be considered legitimate."

Following the Israeli war against Hezbollah in 2006, U.N. Security Council Resolution 1701 called for the "Delineation of the international borders of Lebanon, especially in those areas where the border is disputed or uncertain, including in the Shebaa Farms area."

=== Arab League ===
The Arab League backed Lebanon's claim with a communique issued at Arab League's 13th session in 2001, asking for "complete Israeli withdrawal from all occupied Palestinian territory, including Jerusalem, from the occupied Syrian Golan Heights to the line of 4 June 1967 and from the remaining occupied Lebanese territory up to the internationally recognized borders, including the Shab‘a farmlands".

A joint meeting of the Arab League and the Organization of Islamic Cooperation in November 2023 passed a resolution which called for an "end to the Israeli occupation of the Palestinian territories occupied in 1967, including East Al-Quds, the occupied Syrian Golan, and the Lebanese Shebaa Farms, Kafr Shuba hills, and the outskirts of the town of al-Mari, and the implementation of the two-state solution."

=== Historical documents ===
In 2002, Asher Kaufman of the Harry S. Truman Research Institute at the Hebrew University of Jerusalem, discovered previously unknown documents in French government archives. In one, French litigants in a private dispute entered into a private commercial agreement that suggested that the border should put the Farms in Lebanon. Two other documents, from 1937 and 1939, were reports from the administrative councilor of south Lebanon and the head of the Services Spéciaux in the Syrian town of Quneitra. They noted a discrepancy between the border, as determined by the 1:200,000 Ottoman map, and their view of the "reality" in the region. Collecting "unofficial information" from "various sources", they concluded that in their view the area was Lebanese. Their conclusion was based on the facts that: a) some area residents paid taxes to Lebanon; and b) three or four sheep pens in the Farms belonged to residents of the Lebanese village of Shaba.

In a book published in 1988, Moshe Brawer, an Israeli geographer, mentions two French maps published in 1932 and 1946, the former shows the farm area as being part of Lebanon while the latter shows the area as a Syrian territory.

== See also ==
- 2000–06 Shebaa Farms conflict
- January 2015 Shebaa Farms incident
- Syrian occupation of Lebanon
- Borders of Israel
