= Operation Tyre =

1982 attack on Israeli troops in Lebanon

- Part of the 1982–1983 Tyre headquarters bombings during the 1982 Lebanon War
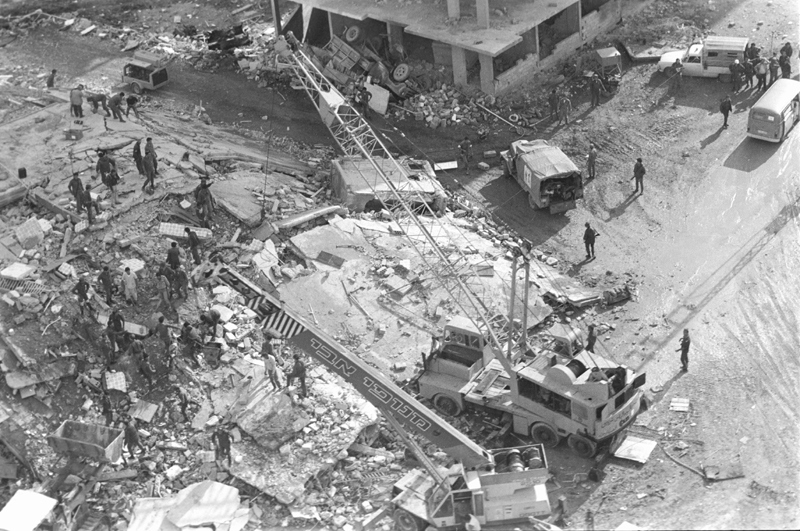
- Aftermath of the attack at the Israeli military's command centre in Tyre
- Location: Tyre, Lebanon
- Date: 11 November 1982; 43 years ago 7:00 a.m. (UTC+2:00)
- Target: Israel Defense Forces
- Attack type: Suicide bombing
- Weapon: Explosive-laden Peugeot 504
- Deaths: 89–102 (75 Israelis, 14–27 Arabs)
- Injuries: 55 (27 Israelis, 28 Arabs)
- Victims: 10 Israeli MIAs
- Perpetrator: Hezbollah
- Assailant: Ahmad Jafar Qasir

"Operation Tyre" was a suicide attack against the Israel Defense Forces (IDF) in the city of Tyre during the 1982 Lebanon War. It was carried out by Ahmad Jafar Qasir, a Lebanese Shia Muslim who drove an explosive-laden Peugeot 504 towards the IDF command centre in the city. As many as 102 people were killed in the attack, while another 55 were wounded and 10 missing. Responsibility for the car bombing, which preceded another one in November 1983, was attributed to the Iran-backed Lebanese militant organization Hezbollah.

== Attack ==
At 7:00 a.m. on 11 November 1982, an 18- or 19-year-old Lebanese Shia Muslim named Ahmad Jafar Qasir drove a Peugeot 504, which had been outfitted as a car bomb, towards the Israeli military command centre at high speeds and then detonated upon crashing into the first floor of the inspection building. 75 Israelis were killed, including agents of the Shin Bet, along with 14 to 27 Arabs (Palestinians and Lebanese) who were present at the site. Additionally, 27 Israelis and 28 Arabs were injured during the attack, while 10 Israeli soldiers went missing. The attack on the Israeli facility was one of a pair, with a second bombing occurring in November 1983. The car bombing in Tyre has been claimed by Hezbollah and was hailed by the Iranian government as a successful act of resistance against Israel.

== See also ==
- 1982 Lebanon War
  - 1982–1983 Tyre headquarters bombings
- Iran–Israel proxy conflict
  - Hezbollah–Iran relations
