= Bombing of US Embassy in Beirut =

Bombing of U.S. Embassy in Beirut may refer to:

- 1983 US embassy bombing in Beirut
- 1984 US embassy bombing in Beirut
