= Nelson Mandela Boulevard =

Street in Tehran, Iran

- Interactive map of Nelson Mandela Boulevard
- Native name: بلوار نلسون ماندلا (Persian)
- Length: 5.5 km (3.4 mi)
- Location: Tehran
- North end: Modares Expressway
- South end: Arjantin Square

Nelson Mandela Boulevard (Persian: بلوار نلسون ماندلا) (old name: Jordan Street and Africa Boulevard) still known as Jordan is an affluent and upper-class district in northern Tehran, Iran. Some people draw similarities between Jordan District and the Kensington area in London as the area is a mixture of residential and commercial locale, filled with the homes and businesses of politicians, diplomats, expatriates, and artists.

Before the Iranian Revolution in 1979, it was called Jordan Street, named after the American Presbyterian missionary Samuel M. Jordan and used to be one of Tehran's most popular avenues. Renamed Nelson Mandela Boulevard in recent years, it is amongst the most famous streets in northern Tehran after Valiasr Street which is the longest conventional street in the Middle East. It is also famous for being one of the liveliest streets of Tehran, experiencing regular traffic jams even at 2:00 am during summer.

== Location ==
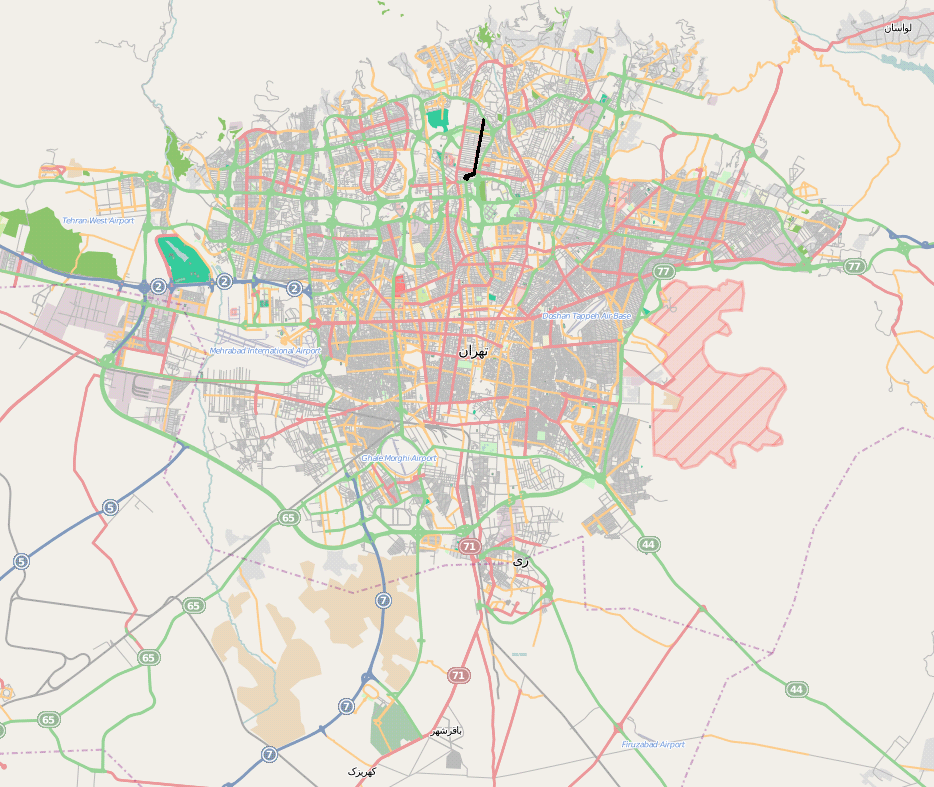
Nelson Mandela Boulevard in Tehran map (in black)

Nelson Mandela Boulevard is located in the northern part of Tehran, Iran's capital and largest city.

The tree-lined boulevard is connected to Valiasr Street (ex-"Pahlavi Avenue") via crossing streets branching from its west side, while the east side leads to cul-de-sac bordering the Modarres Expressway.

== Characteristics ==
Nelson Mandela Boulevard, commonly known as Jordan Street, has been associated with Tehran’s luxury culture and contains luxury apartment buildings and commercial establishments.

The teens used to drive in groups along Jordan Boulevard in their cars during evening times and on Fridays to have fun and interact socially in a process referred to as courtship; hence Jordan Boulevard became a famous social place in Tehran.

The area, together with its neighbouring Valiasr Avenue, is suffering from severe traffic congestion due to rapid commercialization and a lack of direct highway access.

It is also the home to the Italian, Polish, Bulgarian, Greek, Venezuelan, Sri Lankan, Mexican, Uruguayan, Kenyan, Brunei, Qatari, Kuwaiti, Omani, and some other Arab embassies as well as the home of a lot of ambassador of countries and also many ministries are located there.

== Name dispute ==
Since the boulevard was renamed after the Iranian Revolution to Nelson Mandela Boulevard, many locals and foreigners alike continue to refer to the area as Jordan. This is presumably due to the effect of the wealthy inhabitants refusing to accept the new government's name.

== History ==
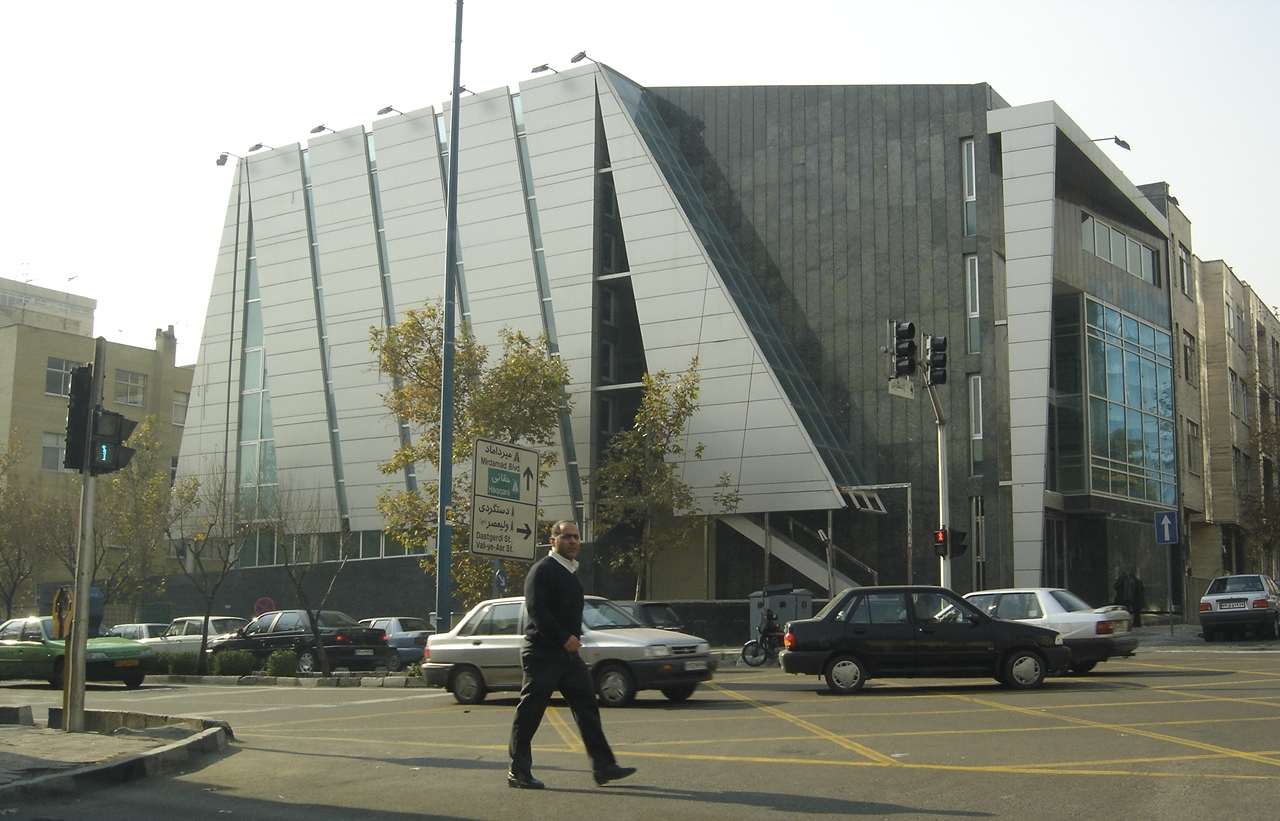
Mid part of Nelson Mandela Boulevard (Jordan) in 2007

The avenue was formerly named after Dr. Samuel Jordan, the founder and head of the American College of Tehran, now the Alborz High School, from the 1910s to 1941.

From North to South
	Modarres Expressway
	Mirdamad Boulevard
	Shahid Haghani Expressway
	Hemmat Expressway
	Qasem Soleimani Expressway
Beyhaghi Terminal
Arjantin Square	Beyhaghi Street; Shahid Ahmad Qasir Street
From South to North
