= History of Hezbollah =

Hezbollah originated within the Shiite block of Lebanese society. According to the CIA World Factbook estimate in 2022, Shiites comprise 31.2 percent of Lebanon's population, predominating in three areas of Lebanon: Southern Lebanon, Beirut and its environs (Dahieh), and the northern Beqaa valley region.

== Origins ==
Lebanon gained its independence on November 22, 1943, with the French army withdrawing its soldiers from Lebanon in 1946. The Lebanese National Pact became the framework for governance, leading to the allocation of political privileges, such as membership in parliament as well as senior bureaucratic and political appointments, to each of the 17 recognized sectarian communities based roughly on the proportionate size of each community. The two most important positions of the presidency and premiership were given to the Maronites and Sunnis respectively, with the Shia receiving the speakership of the parliament in recognition of their status as the third largest demographic group in the country. Despite the appointment they remained politically, socially and financially marginalized.

=== Shia political movement before Hezbollah ===
Between 1943 and 1990, Shiites areas in Southern Lebanon and Beqaa Valley were long neglected by the Lebanese state which diverted its resources to other areas, and Shias were sorely underrepresented with very little say in the government. Early on, Lebanese society was traditionally dominated by the za'im, a political boss from a leading feudal family. The za'im system was strongly criticized from early on, most notably by the Najaf-educated cleric Muhammad Jawad Mughniyya who wrote newspaper editorials against capitalism, feudalism, and the pro-Western Baghdad Pact in 1956, and demanded justice for peasants from the "wicked politicians and ruling clique". Mughniyya's efforts were eventually succeeded by Musa Sadr.

Opposition to feudalism grew stronger, and by the late 1960s, za'ims had little power left. Instead, Shiites lent their increasing numbers to a wide variety of Leftist organizations, particularly ones which demanded the reformation of the Lebanese system and the abolishment of sectarianism. During the early 1960s–70s, Shiites formed significant numbers in the Arab Nationalist Movement, the Ba'ath Party (1947–1966), the Lebanese Communist Party, the Syrian Social Nationalist Party, the Progressive Socialist Party (where they formed 20% of the membership in 1958), and Palestinian factions which were based in Lebanon, namely Fatah, the PFLP, and Arab Liberation Front. Shiite circles of former Arab Nationalist Movement members went on to establish other parties, including Socialist Lebanon, Organization of Lebanese Socialists, the Communist Action Organization in Lebanon and Arab Socialist Action Party, which advocated violence as the best means to end class conflict. Multiple Shias rose into prominence within leftist circles, most notably Marxist–Leninist intellectuals Husayn Mroue and Mahdi Amel, CAOL leader Mohsen Ibrahim, and Arab Socialist Ba'ath Party leader Assem Qanso.

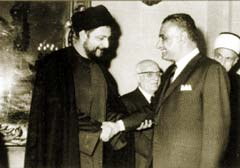
Musa Sadr with Gamal Abdel Nasser in the 1960s

In 1960, Imam Musa Sadr came to Lebanon to become the leading Shi'ite figure in the city of Tyre. He quickly became one of the most prominent advocates for the Shia population of Lebanon, a group that was both economically and politically disadvantaged. In 1969 he was appointed as the first head of the Supreme Islamic Shia Council, an entity meant to give the Shias more say in government. In 1974 he founded the "Movement of the Deprived" to press for better economic and social conditions for the Shi'ites. He established a number of schools and medical clinics throughout southern Lebanon, many of which are still in operation today. During the Lebanese Civil War he at first aligned himself with the Lebanese National Movement, and the Movement of the Disinherited developed an armed wing known as Afwaj al-Mouqawma Al-Lubnaniyya (Lebanese Resistance Regiments), better known as Amal.

Although Amal had its genesis in the Movement of the Disinherited (Harakat al-Mahrumin), founded by the charismatic Musa as-Sadr, when Sadr was abducted it turned briefly to the secular leadership of Husayn Husayni in 1979, and since 1980, Nabih Berri. Under Berri's leadership, Amal alienated many religious Shias by supporting the Syrian-backed presidency of Elias Sarkis and compromising Sadr's struggle for social and political reforms. The secularization of Amal provided the Najaf deportees with an ideal setting to spread their militant brand of Shia activism.

Whereas Musa Sadr viewed the Lebanese state as a legitimate entity in need of reform and had developed close ties with reform-minded Christian politicians, some Lebanese seminarians in Najaf refused to accept the state of Lebanon, its current borders, or its consociational power-sharing formula as unassailable facts. This group organized under supervision of Iraqi Ayatollah Muhammad Baqir al-Sadr (the cousin of Musa), one of the leading clerics in the Shia seminary (hawza) of Najaf in Iraq. These clerics theorized about an Islamic state woven of a clandestine network that became known as Hizb al-Da'wa (the "Party of the Calling"), which established a twin party in Lebanon. This network was established in Lebanon by clerics who returned from Najaf like Sayyed Mohammad Hussein Fadlallah and Sayyed Abbas al-Musawi.

=== Hezbollah's emergence ===
The organization developed in a milieu which underwent a sequence of radicalizing events. Following independence in 1943, the Lebanese Shia community was disproportionately the poorest community in the country, and was marginalized by a ruling Sunni–Christian duo and severely underrepresented relative to the community's size. In 1976, more than 100,000 Shias were forcefully displaced from the East Beirut canton into Dahieh and Southern Lebanon following violent events of Karantina massacre and the siege of Shiite neighborhood of Naba'a and Tel al-Zaatar, a Palestinian refugee camp with 43% Shiite inhabitants. The context of radicalization was further enhanced with the disappearance of Musa Sadr in 1978, and notably the success of the Iranian revolution in 1979. The latter's impact was so profound that when the Iran–Iraq War raged in September 1980, around 500–600 Amal volunteers went to Iran to join Mostafa Chamran.

The most crucial event for Hezbollah's emergence is the Israeli invasion of Lebanon in 1982. Prior the invasion, the Palestine Liberation Organization (PLO) had used Southern Lebanon as its base of operations against Israeli targets. Israel invaded Lebanon to evict the PLO and install their ally Bachir Gemayel as president, destroying 80% of villages in Southern Lebanon in the process and causing around 400,000 refugees to flee their homes, which ultimately led to the formation of Hezbollah as an armed organization to expel the occupying Israeli forces.

According to Ahmad Nizar Hamzeh in "In the Path of Hizbullah", four crisis conditions catalyzed the emergence of Hezbollah:

- 1. Identity crisis and marginalization

When Lebanon became independent on November 22, 1943, "the Shiites felt that they were the despised stepchildren of a state governed by a Maronite-Sunni alliance." The Shias were ripe for every Shi'a protective organization like Hezbollah.

- 2. Structural imbalance

Shias were politically underrepresented, based on the National Pact of 1943, which vested legislative and executive as well as military positions in rough proportion to the demographic size of the country's eighteen recognized sectarian groupings. In 1946, the Christian Maronites and the Sunni Muslims occupied 40 and 27 percent respectively, of the highest civilian posts. In contrast, the Shia occupied 3.2 percent. By the 1980s, Shias had become Lebanon's largest single confessional community with almost 1,400,000 people, surpassing the Maronite and Sunni populations, which were each estimated at nearly 800,000 a piece. The Shiites believed that their representation was not commensurate with their numerical size. Economically the broader Shia community in Lebanon was very poor. Almost 85 percent lived in the rural region of South Lebanon and in one area of the Beqaa Valley, and subsisted on what they earned, mostly from selling tobacco to the state monopoly or growing vegetables. They were also exposed to the military fighting between Israel and the Palestine Liberation Organization (PLO). To escape these conditions, many Shias migrated to the slums of eastern Beirut and shantytowns in the suburbs south of Beirut. Hamzeh writes that "[t]hese two areas, known as the "belt of misery," became the breeding ground of Shia militancy in the 1980s. Even in the 1960s and 70s, the charismatic leader Imam Musa al-Sadr began to activate the politically quiescent Shias of Lebanon.

- 3. Military Defeat

"When identity crisis and structural imbalance are reinforced by military defeat, a society's militancy potential increases markedly. Military defeat followed by foreign occupation opens the way for militant movements fostering political organization or employing guerrilla warfare and enjoying widespread grassroots support. This is what happened when Israel invaded Lebanon in 1978 (Operation Litani) and 1982 (Lebanon War), actions which, according to Hamzeh were undertaken in order to remove the PLO from Lebanon and disassociate Lebanon from Syria's influence. Israel hoped that "a Lebanon freed from Syria and the PLO, with a Christian-dominated regime, would bring peace and closer connections between the two countries." But these operations oppressed Shi'a which lived in south Lebanon. The Israelis killed more than one thousand civilian Shias, leading to a mass exodus of yet more Shia refugees to the Beirut slums. Israel's 1982 invasion and occupation of Lebanon bolstered the fortunes of Hizbullah by "providing a politic-military environment that legitimated the group and gave a rationale for its guerrilla warfare. Similarly, the presence of the Western foreign troops in Lebanon, particularly of the U.S. Marines, also boosted the fortunes of Hezbollah, which considered fighting such forces to be as legitimate as fighting the Israeli occupation."

- 4. Demonstration Effect ( Iran's Islamic Revolution)

According to Hamzeh "Iran's revolution had its greatest impact in Lebanon," even though the two countries are not adjacent, because Lebanon's long-suffering Shias were most receptive to Iran's Islamic revolutionary message. Shia clerics from Lebanon, Iraq and Iran, in particular Khomeini, had known each other well in the Shia city of Najaf in Iraq where they participated in their "circles of learning." Soon after Khomeini's victorious return to Iran on February 1, 1979, he became the unchallenged leader and chief ideologue of the Shias inside and outside Iran." He met with militant Shia clergy (e.g., Sheikh Subhi al-Tufayli, Sayyed Abbas al-Musawi) and other militants in August 1982 at the Islamic Movements conference in Tehran—the so-called First "Conference for the Downtrodden".

== Foundation ==
Scholars differ as to when Hezbollah came to be a distinct entity. Various sources list the official formation of the group as early as 1982 whereas Diaz and Newman maintain that Hezbollah remained an amalgamation of various Shi'a groups until as late as 1985. Another version states that it was formed by supporters of Sheikh Ragheb Harb, a leader of the resistance killed by Israeli Shin Bet agents in February 1984.

Regardless of when the name came into official use, a number of Shia groups were slowly assimilated to form the organization following the 1982 Israeli invasion of Lebanon. In summer of 1982, around 1,000–2,000 IRGC troops, notably the 27th brigade which distinguished itself in Battle of Khorramshahr and was considered among the best in the Iranian army, and the 58th elite unit, made way into the Beqaa Valley, where they conducted training for thousands of young fighters. The trainees also included former members of the underground Islamic Dawa Party, members of the Association of Muslim Students, former Amal cadres, some former Communists of the Communist Action Organization and former Shiite members of Fatah. This was somewhat reflected in the diverse backgrounds of the prominent members: from former member of Fatah's elite Force 17 Imad Mughniyeh, to Islamic Dawa Party member Abbas al-Musawi, to former Amal Movement member Hassan Nasrallah. By 1984, thousands of Shiites had been enlisted into Hezbollah, including most of the important Shiite clergy.

Initially, members of the "Islamic Resistance in Lebanon" conducted operations under the name of Lebanese National Resistance Front, different aliases or smaller groups that were eventually absorbed within Hezbollah. These included the notorious Islamic Jihad Organization, Islamic Amal, Imam Husayn Fedayeen, Organization of the Oppressed on Earth and the Revolutionary Justice Organization.

Iranian clerics, most notably Ali Akbar Mohtashamipur, supervised the arming and funding of Hezbollah. By 1986–1987, Hezbollah had become the main politico-military force among the Shia community in Lebanon, effectively controlling all of Dahieh and the Beqaa Valley, and boasted an armed force of 25,000.

After publicly announcing the formation of Hezbollah in 1985, Sheikh Subhi Tufaili became its first Secretary-General elected by the Shura council. In 1991 Sayyed Abbas al-Musawi substituted Tufaili as Secretary-General but was assassinated within months by Israel, and was succeeded by Sayyed Hassan Nasrallah.

=== Ideology ===
During its early days, Hezbollah sought to establish an Islamic state in Lebanon similar to Iran by virtue of the country's cantonization at the time (i.e. Christian East Beirut canton, Druze Civil Administration of the Mountain, Northern canton in Zgharta). The party has reportedly since abandoned this goal and formally renounced it in its second political manifesto published in 2009.

== Hezbollah during the Lebanese Civil War (1982–1990) ==
After emerging during the civil war of the early 1980s as a resistance movement for Lebanon's Shia community, Hezbollah focused on expelling Israeli and Western forces from Lebanon. Although Hezbollah battled the Amal militia for control of Shia areas, and vigorously attacked Israel's Lebanese proxy (SLA), unlike other wartime militias, it never engaged in sectarian bloodletting (or fought a major engagement with the army) during the war.

Between 1984 and 1991, there were 3,425 recorded military operations against Israeli forces and the SLA, most of them conducted by Hezbollah.

=== Suicide attacks ===
Hezbollah is reputed to have been among the first Islamic resistance groups to use tactical suicide bombing in the Middle East, and early bombings attributed to the group (e.g. the Tyre truck bombings and the 1983 Beirut barracks bombing) inspired other militant extremist groups to adopt the tactic for their own purposes. The predominantly Shia residents of south Lebanon had born the brunt of the Israeli invasion, which sent floods of refugees into the Beqaa and Beirut (already teeming with a 300,000 strong southern "poverty belt" of newly urbanized Shias), eager for recruitment. Many politicized Shias also felt victimized by the entry of an American and European multi-national force (MNF) into Beirut in 1982, not only because it was perceived as pro-Israeli, but also because its mission was to support a government beholden to the right-wing Christian Phalange Party (led by then-President Amine Gemayel) and Sunni Beiruti notables (e.g. Prime Minister Shafik Wazzan) and quick to assert its newfound strength by unceremoniously ejecting Shiite squatters from posh neighborhoods of West Beirut near the airport. Although Hezbollah avoided direct confrontation with the state, it lashed out with fury at the MNF, most notably with the October 1983 twin suicide bombings that killed more than 300 American and French servicemen (1983 Beirut barracks bombing), forcing its withdrawal in 1984. The following year, in the face of mounting Hezbollah attacks, the Israel Defense Forces (IDF) began redeploying to a thin "security zone" in the south.

Jeffrey Goldberg writes in The New Yorker that during this period Hezbollah

quickly became the most successful terrorist organization in modern history, [serving] as a role model for terror groups around the world, ...and virtually invent[ing] the multipronged terror attack when, early on the morning of October 23, 1983, it synchronized the suicide bombings, in Beirut, of the United States Marine barracks and an apartment building housing a contingent of French peacekeepers. Those attacks occurred just twenty seconds apart.

(note: Hezbollah did not claim responsibility for these attacks. Despite targeting military forces - actually peacekeepers - the bombing has been described as an act of terrorism because it was carried out by illegal combatants acting outside of the Combatants Privilege provided by the Third Geneva Convention)

According to Robert Pape's Dying to Win, Hezbollah conducted three distinct suicide bombing campaigns against forces it deemed to be occupying Lebanon:

1. 1983–1984: 5 acts against the US and France, including these specific acts:
  - April 18, 1983: U.S. embassy bombing in Beirut.
  - October 23, 1983: Beirut barracks bombing, targeting French soldiers and United States Marines; responsibility for this is disputed (see 1983 Beirut barracks bombing).
2. 1982–1985: 11 acts against Israel.
3. 1985–1986: 20 acts against Israel and the South Lebanon Army.

In addition to these campaigns, Pape documents six other isolated suicide attacks taken by Hezbollah between 1985 and 1999.

Upon Israel's withdrawal from South Lebanon in 2000, according to Pape, the necessary conditions for Hezbollah's continuing use of suicide attacks evaporated. Hezbollah has not directly participated in suicide bombings since 1999, its leaders evidently having renounced the tactic.

=== Attacks against Western targets ===
Hezbollah is believed by the United States' intelligence agencies to have

- kidnapped David S. Dodge, president of the American University in Beirut on July 19, 1982. . Hezbollah was "believed to be behind this abduction and that of most of the other 30 Westerners seized over the next 10 years."
- car bombed "the U.S. embassy in Beirut on April 18, 1983, ... killing 63 people, 17 of whom [were] American citizens."
- truck bombed "U.S. Marine barracks, on October 23, 1983, ... killing 241 American military personnel stationed in Beirut as past of a peace-keeping force. A separate attack against the French military compound in Beirut [killed] 58." The truck that destroyed the American barracks was "rigged with 12,000 pounds of TNT."
- kidnapped CIA Beirut Station Chief William Francis Buckley on March 16, 1984, "After 15 months in captivity of torture and illness" he was killed, and responsibility claimed by Hezbollah. (Evidenced by numerous copies of video and photographic material sent by Hezbollah to Western Embassies and government offices depicting some of his torture sessions, which were claimed by the group at the time as proof of his captivity. The material was periodically delivered from May 1984 until October 1985 when the group made an announcement containing a photograph of Buckley's heavily scarred corpse along with the statement that they had killed him and would not return his body for burial.)
- car bombed "the U.S. embassy annex in Beirut" on September 20, 1984, taking the lives of "two Americans and 22 others."
- hijacked "a Kuwait Airlines Flight 221 on December 4, 1984. Hezbollah militants killed four passengers including two Americans."
- kidnapped and tortured to death U.S. Marine Colonel William R. Higgins between 1989 and 1991 when his body was found dumped on the side of a small Beirut street after the group had made and distributed a video showing his scarred and disfigured body hanging from a ceiling.
- kidnapped around 30 other Westerners between 1982 and 1992, including U.S. journalist Terry Anderson, British journalist John McCarthy, the Archbishop of Canterbury's special envoy Terry Waite and Irish citizen Brian Keenan.
- of carrying out the 1985 hijacking of TWA Flight 847 en route from Athens to Rome.

These accusations are denied by Hezbollah.

In early 1998, Lebanon's highest court announced that it intended to arrest the Secretary-General (until 1991) of Hezbollah, Sheikh Subhi Tufayli, for the 1983 Beirut barracks bombing. After a shoot-out that left Lebanese soldiers and some of Tufayli's supporters dead, he escaped and has not been seen since.

=== End of Civil War: The Taif Agreement and Hezbollah's failure to disarm ===
After 16 years, the civil war halted following successful negotiation of the Taif Agreement, which required the "disbanding of all Lebanese and non-Lebanese militias" and required the government to "deploy the Lebanese army in the border area adjacent to Israel."

Despite this agreement, Syria, in control of Lebanon at that time (with the support of Iran), allowed Hezbollah to maintain their arsenal, control the Shia areas in Southern Lebanon along the border with Israel.

The continued existence of Hezbollah's military wing after 1990 is considered by the UN to violate the Taif Agreement.

Hezbollah, however, justifies maintaining its militia on the basis of Israel's continued presence in Sheba Farms, which the UN considers Syrian territory and the Lebanon government has not made moves to disarm Hezbollah as it considers it a legitimate resistance organization.

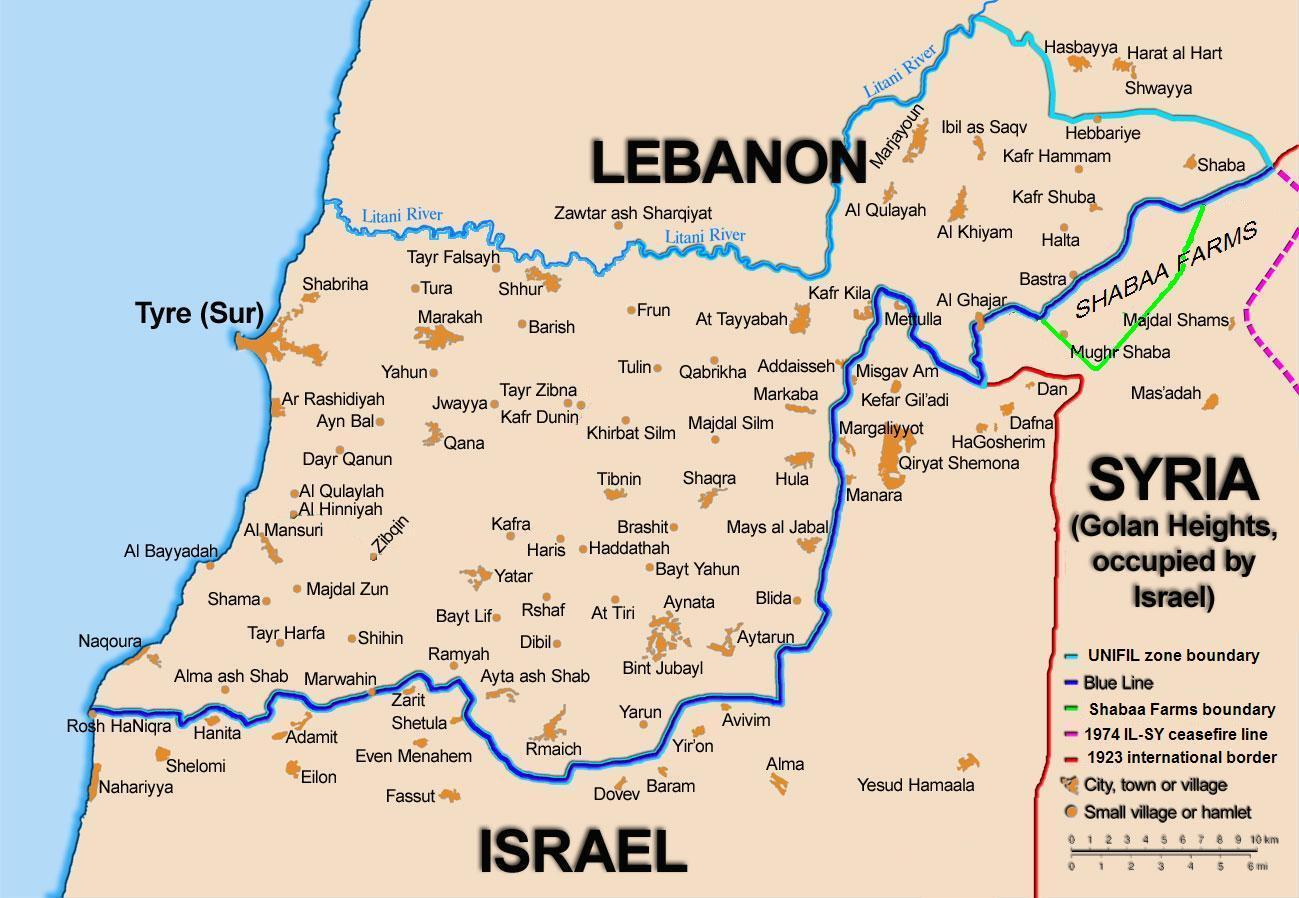
Map of southern Lebanon, featuring the Blue Line and Litani River, 2006

=== Conflict in South Lebanon ===
South Lebanon was occupied by Israel between 1982 and 2000. Hezbollah, along with the mainly leftist and secular groups in the Lebanese National Resistance Front, fought a guerilla war against Israel and the South Lebanon Army. The National Resistance Front militias disarmed in accordance with the Taif Accords, but Hezbollah remained defiant, claiming until all Lebanese soil was liberated and Israel expelled, resistance against occupation would continue.

The fighting culminated during Operation Grapes of Wrath in April 1996 when Israel launched an assault and air-campaign against Hezbollah. The campaign resulted in the deaths of 106 civilian refugees in an aerial bombardment of a United Nations base at Qana. Popular feeling that the shelling of Qana was intentional fuelled Shia radicalism and enhanced support for Hezbollah, as did resentment of large-scale civilian evacuations made necessary (on as little as two hours notice) by the fighting.

In January 2000, Hezbollah assassinated the commander of the South Lebanon Army's Western Brigade, Colonel Aql Hashem, at his home in the security zone. Hashem had been responsible for day-to-day operations of the SLA.

On 24 May, after the collapse of the SLA and the rapid advance of Hezbollah forces, Israel withdrew its troops from southern Lebanon, more than six weeks before its stated deadline of 7 July." Hezbollah and many other Lebanese considered this to be a victory, and since then its popularity has been boosted in Lebanon.

=== Terrorist activities ===
- The US government claims Hezbollah carried out two terrorist attacks in Argentina during the early 1990s: the 1992 Israeli embassy bombing in Buenos Aires, killing 29 people, and the bombing of a Jewish community center there, killing 85. Hezbollah denies these claims. Responsibility for the former attack was claimed by Imad Mughniyah's Islamic Jihad Organization - considered to be a unit of Hezbollah - within 24 hours of the attack. In April 2024, an Argentinian court ruled that Hezbollah was the perpetrator at the direction of the Iranian government
- On July 26, 1994, eight days after the community center bombing, the Israeli Embassy in London was car bombed by two Palestinians. The United Kingdom, Israel and Argentina blamed Hezbollah for the attack.

== Hezbollah after the Israeli withdrawal ==
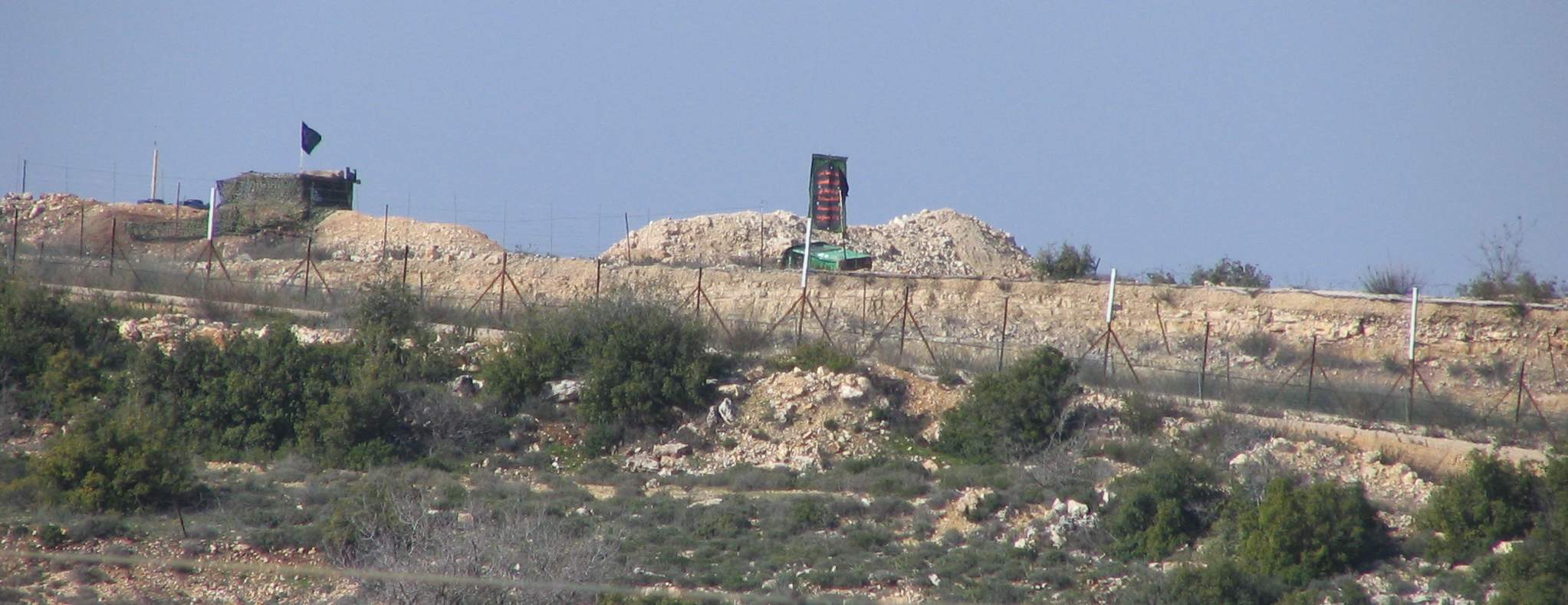
Hezbollah outpost near the Israeli border. This small outpost was built after the Israeli withdrawal.

On May 25, 2000, Israel withdrew from Lebanon to the UN-agreed Israeli border, and their pullout was certified by the UN as complete. Lebanon and Syria claim the Shebaa Farms, a 35 km^{2} area, to be occupied Lebanese territory despite the UN ruling, and on that basis Hezbollah has continued to engage Israeli forces in that area. The UN recognizes the Shebaa farms as part of the Golan Heights, and thus Syrian (and not Lebanese, though both countries deny that) territory occupied by Israel since the 1967 Six-Day War.

Hezbollah's role in the Israeli withdrawal from southern Lebanon gained the organization much respect within Lebanon and the wider Arab and Islamic world, particularly among the country's large Shi'a community. The Maronite President of Lebanon, Émile Lahoud, said: "For us Lebanese, and I can tell you the majority of Lebanese, Hezbollah is a national resistance movement. If it wasn't for them, we couldn't have liberated our land. And because of that, we have big esteem for the Hezbollah movement."

After Israeli forces left Southern Lebanon in 2000, Hezbollah provided military defense of the area. It is suggested by some that the Lebanese Government has at times viewed Hezbollah as the army of South Lebanon. Since summer 2006, though, foreign peacekeepers and Lebanese army troops have also been stationed in the South. Fouad Siniora said that "the continued presence of Israeli occupation of Lebanese lands in the Shebaa Farms region is what contributes to the presence of Hezbollah weapons. The international community must help us in (getting) an Israeli withdrawal from Shebaa Farms so we can solve the problem of Hezbollah's arms." Hezbollah says Israel's withdrawal from southern Lebanon proves that the Jewish state only understands the language of resistance. It defends its right to keep its weapons as a deterrent against Israeli attack, to liberate the disputed Shebaa Farms border area, which is occupied by Israel.

Since Israel's withdrawal from Lebanon in 2000, and until the conflict arising in July 2006, Hezbollah has used the period of quiet to create the Hezbollah rocket force, which it claims number over 10,000. Placing them, according to many reports, in civilian locations, including family homes, crowded residential neighborhoods and mosques.

The United Nations considers the Shebaa Farms to be Syrian territory, not Lebanese and has stated that Israel has withdrawn from all Lebanese territory. However, both Syria and Lebanon consider the Shebaa Farms as part of Lebanese territory. Furthermore, various United Nations Security Council resolutions require Israel to withdraw from all occupied territories, including all Lebanese and Syrian territories.

Clashes between Hezbollah and Israeli forces continued, albeit at a relatively low level, in the years following 2000.

=== Overflights ===
Israeli aircraft continue to fly over Lebanese territory, eliciting condemnation from the ranking UN representative in Lebanon. Hezbollah's retaliatory anti-aircraft fire, doubling as small caliber artillery, has on some occasions landed within Israel's northern border towns, inciting condemnation from the UN Secretary-General. On November 7, 2004, Hezbollah responded to what it described as repeated Israeli violations of Lebanese airspace by flying an Iranian-built unmanned drone aircraft over northern Israel.

=== Israeli / Hezbollah prisoner exchange ===
On October 7, 2000, Hezbollah abducted three Israel Defense Forces soldiers (Adi Avitan, Omer Soued and Binyamin Avraham) from Shebaa Farms and sought to obtain the release of 14 Lebanese prisoners, some of whom had been held since 1978.

On October 16, 2000, Hezbollah announced the kidnapping of Elchanan Tannenbaum, an Israeli businessman.

On January 25, 2004, Hezbollah successfully negotiated an exchange of prisoners with Israel, through German mediators. The prisoner swap was carried out on January 29: 30 Lebanese and Arab prisoners, the remains of 60 Lebanese militants and civilians, 420 Palestinian prisoners, and maps showing Israeli mines in South Lebanon were exchanged for an Israeli businessman and army reserve colonel Elchanan Tenenbaum kidnapped in 2001 and the remains of the three Israel Defense Forces (IDF) soldiers mentioned above, who were killed either during the Hezbollah operation, or in its immediate aftermath. For the entire period between the abduction (October 2000) and the end of the negotiations (January 2004), Hezbollah did not provide information about the death of the 3 kidnapped soldiers (Adi Avitan, Beni Avraham and Umar Suad) even though Israel intelligence has suspected them to be already dead.

=== Assassinations of Hezbollah Officials ===
Abbas Mussawi, Secretary General of Hezbollah, was assassinated in February, 1992, after which Nasrullah was elected to the position.

On July 19, 2004, a senior Hezbollah official, Ghaleb Awwali, was assassinated in a car bombing in Beirut. Hezbollah blamed Israel; credit was claimed, and then retracted, by a previously unheard of Sunni group called Jund Ash Sham, while Israel denied involvement. According to Al-Arabiya, unidentified Lebanese police also identified the group as a cover for Israel.

In June 2006, the Lebanese military arrested an alleged assassination squad led by former South Lebanese Army corporal Mahmoud Abu Rafeh. According to army statements, the cell was trained and supported by the Israeli Mossad and "used ... to carry out assigned assassinations in Lebanon." Among the killings attributed to the squad are those of Hezbollah officials Ali Saleh (2003) and Ali Hassan Dib (1999).

During Awwali's funeral, Nasrallah proclaimed that Awwali was "among the team that dedicated their lives in the last few years to help their brothers in occupied Palestine," which some take to refer to aiding Hamas.

On February 12, 2008, senior operative Imad Mughniyah was killed in Damascus, Syria. He was buried two days later in the presence of Hezbollah leader Nasrallah and a high-ranking Iranian delegation.

=== Border conflict ===
- On March 12, 2002, in a Hezbollah shooting attack on the Shelomi-Metzuba route in northern Israel, six Israelis civilians were killed.
- On August 10, 2003, a 16-year-old Israeli boy was killed by shrapnel from an anti-aircraft shell fired by Hezbollah, and four others were wounded.
- In January 2005, Hezbollah planted five "improvised explosive devices" (IEDs) just on the Israeli side of the border near Zarit. An armored bulldozer sent to remove the mines was fired upon by anti-tank missiles, killing the bulldozer's driver, Sgt. Maj. Jan Rotzanski.
- On April 7, 2005, Two Israeli Arabs from the village Ghajar near the Israel-Lebanon border were abducted by Hezbollah operatives. They were later released.
- On November 21, 2005, Hezbollah launched a heavy attack along the entire border with Israel In response to an Israeli attack on Lebanese villages in the south of Lebanon Harel The attack failed when IDF Paratroopers ambushed and killed 4 Hezbollah members and scattered the rest. The IDF counter-attacked and destroyed Hezbollah's front line outposts and communication centers. The scope of the attack forced Lebanon (whose army does not control southern Lebanon) to request a cease-fire. Following the attack the UN Security Council denounced Hezbollah. Commentators have speculated that the attack was an attempt to draw Israel into renewed conflict in Lebanon, alleviating diplomatic pressure on its backers Syria (which is under investigation for the assassination of Lebanese prime minister Rafiq Hariri) and Iran (which is under UN investigation regarding alleged violations of the Nuclear Non-Proliferation Treaty).
- On December 27, 2005, BM-21 Grad rockets fired from Hezbollah territory smashed into houses in the northern Israeli city of Kiryat Shmona wounding three people. UN Secretary General Kofi Annan called on the Lebanese Government "to extend its control over all its territory, to exert its monopoly on the use of force, and to put an end to all such attacks." Lebanese Prime Minister Fouad Siniora denounced the attack as "aimed at destabilizing security and diverting attention from efforts exerted to solve the internal issues prevailing in the country." Hezbollah denied any responsibility or knowledge that an attack was going to take place.

=== Hezbollah activities in the al-Aqsa Intifada ===
In December 2001 three Hezbollah operatives were caught in Jordan while attempting to bring BM-13 Katyusha rockets into the West Bank. Sayyed Hassan Nasrallah, secretary general of Hezbollah, responded that "It is every freedom loving peoples right and duty against occupation to send arms to Palestinians from any possible place."

In June 2002, shortly after the Israeli government launched Operation Defensive Shield, which culminated in the invasion of the Jenin refugee camp, Nasrallah gave a speech in which he defended and praised suicide bombings of Israeli targets by members of Palestinian groups for "creating a deterrence and equalizing fear."

During 2002, 2003 and 2004, the Israeli Security Forces thwarted numerous suicide bombing attacks, some of which Israel claims were planned and funded by Hezbollah and were to have been carried out by Tanzim (Fatah's armed wing) activists. Israeli officials accused Hezbollah of aiding Palestinian political violence and participating in weapon smuggling (see also: Santorini, Karin A).

After Israel's assassination of Hamas spiritual leader Sheikh Ahmed Yassin in March 2004, Hezbollah attacked the IDF along the Blue Line.

It has been claimed that a Hezbollah expert advised on construction of the bomb used for the March 2002 bombing of the Park Hotel.

On June 23, 2004, another allegedly Hezbollah-funded suicide bombing attack was foiled by the Israeli security forces.

In February 2005 the Palestinian Authority accused Hezbollah of attempting to derail the truce signed with Israel. Palestinian officials and former militants described how Hezbollah promised an increase in funding for any occupation resistance group able to carry out an attack on Israeli military targets.

=== UN resolution 1559 ===
U.N. Security Council Resolution 1559 was a resolution sponsored by France and the United States and adopted on September 2, 2004. It called upon Syria to end its military presence in Lebanon by withdrawing its forces and to cease intervening in internal Lebanese politics. The resolution also called for "the disbanding and disarmament of all Lebanese and non-Lebanese militias". The Lebanese army did not disarm or disband Hezbollah prior to the 2006 Israel-Lebanon conflict.

== Political activity ==
=== Early rivalry with Amal ===
Amal reached its peak of influence in Lebanese affairs in 1985, but was challenged by Hezbollah by claims that Amal collaborated with Israel and the United States and was inefficient and corrupt. This rivalry reached a peak in the latter part of 1990 that required a ceasefire, effective in December 1990.

Hassan Nasrallah, elected leader of Hezbollah in 1992 after the assassination of Abbas Musawi, was responsible for the Beka'a area on behalf of the Amal Movement in the early 1980s. He left the organization in 1982 and affiliated with Hizbullah, taking with him many of his followers.

=== Lebanese election: 1992 ===
In 1992, under pressure from Syria, Hezbollah agreed to participate in the 1992 elections. Hezbollah had previously refused to license itself as a political party, arguing that the system was corrupt.

Ali Khamenei, supreme leader of Iran, endorsed Hezbollah in the election. Former Hezbollah secretary general, Subhi al-Tufayli, contested this decision which led to schism in Hezbollah. Then Hezbollah published its political program which contains liberation of Lebanese land from Zionist occupation, abolishment of political sectarianism, ensuring political and media freedom, amending in electoral law to make it more representative of the populace. This program led to the victory of all of twelve seats which were on its electoral list. At the end of that year Hezbollah began to dialog with Lebanese Christians. Hezbollah regards cultural, political and religious freedoms in Lebanon as sanctified. This dialog expands to other groups except those who have relation with Israel.

This election was largely boycotted by Christian parties, which allowed a large number of independents to replace them in the parliament. Hezbollah won a total of eight seats and Nabih Berri, Leader of Amal, was elected parliamentary speaker.

=== Lebanese election: 1996 ===
Hezbollah's electoral platform for the 1996 elections prominently featured "Resisting the occupation" as a primary goal. The party announced its own nominees separate from the Syrian-backed coalition, which it refused to join.

Hezbollah won nine seats in 1996. Following the 1996 elections, Hariri continued as premier and the ex-Amal leader, Nabih Berri, continued as speaker of the assembly.

=== Lebanese election: 2000 ===
The Lebanese election of 2000 saw Hezbollah forming an electoral alliance with Amal that took all 23 seats in South Lebanon (of 128 total). This was the first election to include South Lebanon since 1972, due to the intervening 1975–90 civil war and the Israeli occupation that followed.

=== Hezbollah and the "Cedar Revolution" ===
After the assassination of Rafik Hariri in February 2005, Hezbollah strongly supported Syria through demonstrations. On March 8, in response to the demonstrations of the Cedar Revolution which resulted in Syria's withdrawal, Hezbollah organized a counterdemonstration, reiterating Hezbollah's rejection of Resolution 1559 and its support for a Lebanese-Syrian alliance.

=== Lebanese election: 2005 ===
After the 2005 elections, Hezbollah held 14 seats (up from eight previously in 2000) in the 128-member Lebanese Parliament. The Resistance and Development Bloc centered in South Lebanon won a total of 23 seats in the Second Round of voting only (of which Hezbollah was a part). Hezbollah won one seat in the First & Third Rounds of voting, and Hezbollah ended up with a total of 14 controlled seats as a part of the March 8 Alliance in the end. It also participated for the first time in the Lebanese government of July 2005. Hezbollah has two ministers in the government, and a third is Hezbollah-endorsed. It is primarily active in the Bekaa Valley, the southern suburbs of Beirut, and southern Lebanon.

=== 2006–2008 crisis ===
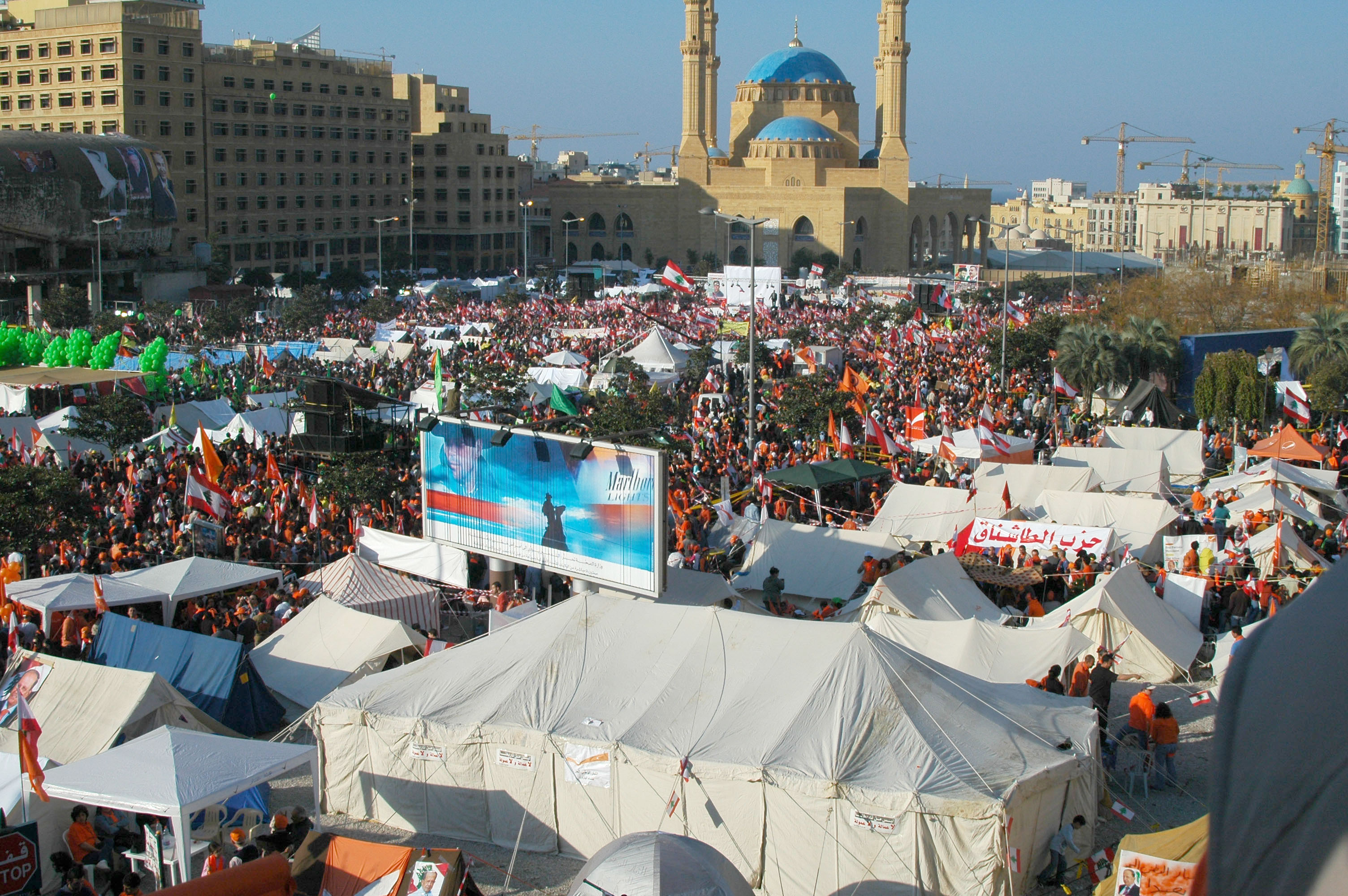
December 10, 2006 pro-Hezbollah rally in Beirut

In spite of having a foot inside the government, Hezbollah has been frequently at odds with certain members of Fouad Siniora's cabinet and in early 2006 formed an alliance with Michel Aoun and his anti-Syrian Free Patriotic Movement.

=== 2006 Lebanon War ===
The 2006 Lebanon War, also called the 2006 Israel–Hezbollah War and known in Lebanon as the July War (Arabic: حرب تموز, romanized: Ḥarb Tammūz) and in Israel as the Second Lebanon War (Hebrew: מלחמת לבנון השנייה, romanized: Milhemet Levanon HaShniya), was a 34-day military conflict in Lebanon, northern Israel and the Golan Heights. The principal parties were Hezbollah paramilitary forces and the Israeli military. The conflict started on 12 July 2006, and continued until a United Nations-brokered ceasefire went into effect in the morning on 14 August 2006, though it formally ended on 8 September 2006 when Israel lifted its naval blockade of Lebanon. Due to unprecedented Iranian military support to Hezbollah before and during the war, some consider it the first round of the Iran–Israel proxy conflict, rather than a continuation of the Arab-Israeli conflict. On 11 August 2006, the United Nations Security Council unanimously approved UN Resolution 1701 in an effort to end the hostilities. The resolution, which was approved by both Lebanese and Israeli governments the following days, called for disarmament of Hezbollah, for withdrawal of Israel from Lebanon, and for the deployment of Lebanese soldiers and an enlarged United Nations Interim Force in Lebanon (UNIFIL) in the south.

== 2008 unrest ==
May 2008's crisis saw the worst sectarian fighting since Lebanon's civil war, with over 80 people killed and sections of West Beirut taken over by Hezbollah in a bid to push the Siniora government to give in to its demands.

== 2009–2010 ==
In 2009, the United Nations special tribunal investigating the murder of former Lebanese prime minister Rafiq Al-Hariri reportedly found evidence linking Hezbollah to the murder.

In October 2010, Hezbollah conducted a drill simulating a takeover of Lebanon – an operation which it threatened was to be carried out in the event that the international tribunal for the assassination of Hariri indicts Hezbollah.

== Syrian Civil War ==
In the Syrian Civil War, Hezbollah supported the government of Bashar al-Assad. Though Hezbollah denied it for a time, this included direct military support.

== 2023 Israel-Hezbollah conflict ==
During the conflict many senior leaders and military commanders of Hezbollah have been targets of Israeli air strikes.

- On 30 July 2024, an Israeli air strike in Beirut killed Hezbollah senior commander, a founding member of Hezbollah’s armed wing, Fuad Shukr.
- On 20 September 2024, Ibrahim Aqil, a senior commander in the group’s elite Radwan forces, was killed in Israeli strike on Beirut.
- On 27 September 2024, an airstrike by the Israeli Air Force in Dahieh killed secretary general Hassan Nasrallah, the Hezbollah’s supreme leader. Ali Karaki, Hezbollah’s commander of the southern front since 1982, was killed in the same Israeli airstrike alongside Nasrallah.
- On 4 October 2024, an Israeli air strike on the southern suburbs of Beirut killed Head of Hezbollah's Executive Council, Hashem Safieddine, likely successor of Nasrallah as Hezbollah's next leader.
- On 17 November 2024, Hezbollah's media relations chief, Mohammed Afif, was killed in an Israeli airstrike on the Syrian Ba'ath Party headquarters in Beirut.
- On 3 December 2024, An Israeli airstrike on a car near Syria's capital Damascus killed Salman Jumaa, a senior Hezbollah figure responsible for liaising with the Syrian army.
- On 1 April 2025, Hassan Bdeir, known as ‘Hajj Rabih,’ a key figure in the Hezbollah’s structure related to the Palestinian cause, and his son, Ali Bdeir, both were killed during the Israeli strike on the southern suburbs of Beirut.
- 23 November 2025, Haytham Ali Tabatabai, Hezbollah’s chief of staff, also known as Sayyid Abu Ali, was killed by an Israeli attack.
- On 1 April 2026, Israel’s navy killed Haj Youssef Ismail Hashem, the commander of Hezbollah’s southern front.

In November 2024, a ceasefire deal was signed between Israel and Hezbollah to end 13 months of conflict. According to the agreement, Hezbollah was given 60 days to end its armed presence in southern Lebanon and Israeli forces were obliged to withdraw from the area over the same period. In December 2024, the fall of Assad’s Baathist regime in Syria was another blow to its Lebanese ally, Hezbollah, which was already weakened because of Israeli military actions.

== Literature ==
- Bregman, Ahron (2002). Israel's Wars: A History Since 1947. London: Routledge. ISBN 0-415-28716-2
- Judith Palmer Harik (2006) Hezbollah: The Changing Face of Terrorism I.B. Tauris. ISBN 1-84511-024-2.
- Ahmad Nizar Hamzeh (2004) In The Path Of Hizbullah. Syracuse University Press. ISBN 0-8156-3053-0
- Hala Jaber (1997) Hezbollah. Columbia University Press. ISBN 0-231-10834-6
- Amal Saad-Ghorayeb (2001) Hizbu'llah: Politics and Religion. London: Pluto Press. ISBN 0-7453-1792-8
- Judith Palmer Harik (2004) Hezbollah: The Changing Face of Terrorism. I.B Tauris. ISBN 1-86064-893-2
- Augustus Richard Norton (1987). Amal and the Shi'a: Struggle for the Soul of Lebanon (Austin and London: University of Texas Press, 1987)
- Augustus Richard Norton (2000). Hizballah of Lebanon: Extremist Ideals vs. Mundane Politics. Council on Foreign Relations.
- Augustus Richard Norton (2007). Hezbollah: A Short History. Princeton University Press. ISBN 978-0-691-13124-5.
- Naim Qassem (2005) Hizbullah: The Story from Within. Saqi Books. ISBN 0-86356-517-4
- Magnus Ranstorp (1996) Hizb'Allah in Lebanon: The Politics of the Western Hostage Crisis. St. Martin's Press. ISBN 0-312-16491-2
- Jamal Sankari (2005) Fadlallah: The Making of a Radical Shi'ite Leader. Saqi Books. ISBN 0-86356-596-4
- Tom Diaz, Barbara Newman (2005) Lightning Out of Lebanon: Hezbollah Terrorists on American Soil. Presidio Press. ISBN 0-345-47568-2
- Avi Jorisch (2004) Beacon of Hatred: Inside Hizballahs Al-Manar Television. Washington Institute for Near East Policy. ISBN 0-944029-88-4
