= Janet Lee Stevens =

American journalist (1950-1983)

- Born: December 1, 1950; Saginaw, Michigan, US
- Died: April 18, 1983 (aged 32); Beirut, Lebanon
- Occupations: Journalist, human rights advocate, translator, and scholar

Janet Lee Stevens (December 1, 1950 – April 18, 1983) was an American journalist, human rights advocate, translator, and scholar of popular Arabic theater. She lived in Beirut during the Lebanese Civil War and chronicled the experiences of Palestinian refugees before and after the Sabra and Shatila Massacre of September 16–18, 1982.

Stevens died in the April 18, 1983 bombing of the U.S. Embassy in Beirut, Lebanon, for which a local Iranian-backed Shia militia claimed responsibility. In 2003, the family of Stevens and other American victims filed a lawsuit against the Iranian government, and in 2005, a U.S. Federal District Court found Iran guilty of orchestrating the embassy bombing and ordered it to pay damages to the plaintiffs, including $13,449,000 to relatives of Janet Lee Stevens. Iran did not respond or pay.

Today, at the University of Pennsylvania, the Janet Lee Stevens Memorial Fund – whose early recipients in the 1980s included the literary critic Edward Said – continues to give grants to scholars whose work promotes Arab-American understanding.

== Life and career ==
=== Early life and post secondary education ===
Janet Lee Stevens was born in Saginaw, Michigan, on December 1, 1950, and grew up in Atlanta, Georgia. She graduated from Northside High School. She attended Stetson University and earned a bachelor's degree in International Studies in 1972. She moved to Philadelphia to study Arabic literature at the University of Pennsylvania, and started the PhD program in 1973 in the department of Oriental Studies (known from 1984 as the Department of Asian and Middle Eastern Studies and from 2005 as the Department of Near Eastern Languages and Civilizations). She won a fellowship to study Arabic at the Center for Arabic Study Abroad (CASA) at the American University in Cairo in the 1974–75 academic year. Around this time she also held a Fulbright scholarship.

=== Journalism ===
In the late 1970s and early 1980s she contributed articles to the journal MERIP Reports under her own name and pseudonymously as June Disney. She moved to Beirut in 1982, during the Lebanese Civil War, and worked as a free-lance journalist and translator in association with several newspapers, including the Lebanese English-medium Monday Morning (Beirut); the Japanese daily Asahi Shimbun (Osaka); the Arabic Lebanese weekly al-Kifah al-Arabi (Beirut); The New York Guardian; the International Herald Tribune; the Atlanta Journal-Constitution; and the Philadelphia Inquirer. At the time of her death she was finishing a PhD dissertation at Penn on popular Arabic theater, under the supervision of the Arabic literary scholar and translator, Roger Allen.

=== Prisoner advocacy ===
As a longtime human rights activist, associated with Amnesty International and other organizations, Stevens advocated for prisoners of conscience. In the early 1970s she researched cases of political prisoners in Tunisia under the regime of Habib Bourguiba. A colleague later attributed the release of several Tunisian prisoners to her efforts.

While living in Tunis in the 1970s, Stevens also participated in an activist, leftist theater group. This group performed Arabic plays in private homes, streets, and markets for popular audiences. She was married during this time to the Tunisian playwright Taoufik Jebali, who years later wrote dialogue for the acclaimed 1990 film of Férid Boughedir, Halfaouine: Boy of the Terraces.

=== Palestinian advocacy ===
While living in Beirut in 1982 and 1983, Stevens frequently visited the Sabra and Shatila refugee camps and became an advocate for the Palestinian residents, who were mostly refugees of the 1948 Arab-Israeli War and their descendants. Writing under the pseudonym June Disney, she published, for example, an article on the Israeli use of cluster bombs and other advanced explosives in the war in Lebanon, and the injuries that Palestinians (including children) in the Burj al-Barajneh camp sometimes sustained when they encountered them or picked them up. During this time she also volunteered at two of the refugee camp hospitals, called Akka Hospital and Gaza Hospital.

The writer Kai Bird observed that some people at the time considered her a "partisan journalist" while others suspected her of working for an intelligence agency. She befriended Dr. Fathi Arafat, the medical doctor who founded and directed the Palestine Red Crescent Society. She knew Fathi's brother, Yasir Arafat, who was chairman of the Palestine Liberation Organization (PLO), and she interviewed him on several occasions. The Japanese journalist Shigeo Arata, who was reporting for the Osaka-based newspaper Asahi Shimbun, later observed in a memoir about his time in Lebanon that, "She knew every detail of the three refugee camps in Beirut, even every corner of the narrow alleys of them, and she had surprisingly extensive contacts with Palestinians from Chairman Arafat to ordinary refugees."

The Palestinians called Stevens "the little drummer girl" because of her staunch support for their cause. In 1982, she gave the British novelist John le Carré, a tour of the Sabra and Shatila camps. Stevens inspired the title of John le Carré's novel The Little Drummer Girl, which was published in 1983. According to one source, Stevens and Le Carré became friends; he consulted her on possible sites for filming in the region; and she was reportedly scheduled to fly to Cyprus to see him a day after the bombing in which she died.

The writer Kai Bird claimed that on August 8, 1982, shortly before Yasser Arafat's departure for Tunis, Stevens visited Arafat in his bunker, begged him not to leave with his PLO fighters, and warned him of the dangers the Palestinian women and children would face if left alone in the camps. Bird traced this account of Stevens's meeting with Arafat to Imad Mughniyah, Arafat's bodyguard at the time, who went on to become a leader in Hezbollah, the Lebanese Shi'ia Islamist militant party. Mughniyah later orchestrated a string of kidnappings and attacks, including the Marine barracks bombing in Beirut of October 1983, the hijacking of TWA flight 847 in June 1985, the bombing of the Israeli embassy in Buenos Aires in March 1992, and the bombing of Khobar Towers in Saudi Arabia in June 1996.

=== Sabra and Shatila massacre ===
One month after the withdrawal of the PLO fighters to Tunis, on September 16–18, 1982, a massacre occurred in the Sabra and Shatila refugee camp in southern Beirut. This massacre was the work of the Phalange, a mostly Maronite Christian right-wing militia, which acted with the knowledge of allies in the Israel Defense Forces, including Ariel Sharon, in order to uproot residual PLO elements at a time when Israeli forces were poised to enter West Beirut. Stevens toured Sabra and Shatila immediately after the massacre; witnessed the Red Crescent's efforts to collect the dead bodies, some of which, she reported, showed evidence of rape and mutilation; and interviewed survivors.

== Death ==
=== Embassy bombing ===
According to UCC Palestine Solidarity Campaign, a group of students and staff at University College Cork (Ireland) engaged in recording the history of Palestinian political advocacy, Stevens went to the U.S. embassy on the day of her death to urge William McIntyre, deputy director of USAID in Lebanon, to pledge more U.S. aid to Palestinian refugees and Lebanese Shi'a groups in Lebanon. According to the University of Pennsylvania's Almanac, Stevens had also been serving as an interpreter to an Arab delegation to the embassy.

Stevens and McIntyre were lunching together in the embassy cafeteria when a truck carrying 2,000 pounds (900 kg) of explosives crashed into the building and detonated. Seven floors in the middle of the building collapsed and "pancaked". The bombs killed 63 people, including 32 Lebanese and 17 Americans. At least eight of the dead were officers of the Central Intelligence Agency, including Robert Ames, the CIA's leading Middle East expert. The remainder were Lebanese staff and others. About 120 more people were injured.

Stevens and McIntyre died instantly in the explosion. Stevens's colleague, Shigeo Arata, Beirut correspondent for the Japanese daily Asahi Shimbun, later identified her body in the hospital morgue of the American University of Beirut.

=== Embassy memorial ===
Stevens was among the Americans honored at a memorial service for the victims of the U.S. embassy bombing, which was held at Andrews Air Force Base in Maryland. U.S. President Ronald Reagan spoke at the service. Stevens's brother, Scott Stevens, later testified before a federal court that the U.S. government charged her family $2,100 to bring her body back from Beirut, because she was not an embassy employee.

== Bombing aftermath ==
=== Recognition of bombing survivor PTSD issues ===
Of the people like Stevens who had been eating lunch in the U.S. embassy's cafeteria in Beirut on April 18, 1983, only two survived the bombing. One of these survivors, diplomat Anne Dammarell, wrote a 1994 Georgetown University MA thesis in which she argued that the bombing caused the American Foreign Service Officers posted in the embassy to experience post-traumatic stress disorder (PTSD) symptoms "similar to those faced by war veterans" but at a time when the U.S. State Department "did not provide sufficient training and follow-up support to allow them to recognize, acknowledge, and fully process the trauma".

Dammarell collected questionnaires from other embassy survivors, one of whom, a USAID officer named Letitia Kelly Butler ("Tish Butler"), later recalled that the Defense Attaché asked her to identify bodies in the makeshift morgue in the hospital basement. Butler recalled: "I saw Janet Stevens, the long-haired journalist, who had been interviewing Bill McIntyre in the cafeteria. She was in a corner with a military guy. He had his hands up and she was almost in a macabre death embrace". Butler added that seeing the bodies of Stevens and others was "the worst part of the whole event for me" and that it "seared images of bodies and body parts on my consciousness".

The Association for Diplomatic Studies and Training (ADST) later cited Dammarell's study for pointing to the lack of adequate support from the U.S. State Department in preparing diplomats for trauma, offering mental health services after incidents, and establishing long-term, follow-up procedures for PTSD survivors. The ADST also suggested that Dammarell's study contributed to changes in policies.

=== Lawsuit against Iran ===
The Islamic Jihad Organization claimed responsibility for this attack. This organization had links to the Lebanese Shi'a party, Hezbollah, and operated with support from the government of the Islamic Republic of Iran, which objected to Israel's invasion of southern Lebanon in June 1982 in response to PLO attacks.

Twenty years after the bombing, Anne Dammarell encouraged the family of Stevens, representing one of eighty plaintiffs of the dead and injured, to join a civil suit in U.S. Federal District Court of Washington, DC against the Islamic Republic of Iran and its Ministry of Intelligence and Security (MOIS). The hearing of this case, Dammarell v. the Islamic Republic of Iran, began on September 8, 2003, and cited evidence that agents of the Iranian government had supported, funded, and planned the embassy attack. Among those who testified were Stevens's identical twin sister, Jo Ann Stevens, and her brothers Hazen H. Stevens and Scott C. Stevens. Lawyers for the plaintiffs connected the embassy bombing attack to other events in which they claimed Iranian government complicity: the suicide bombing of the U.S. Marine Corps in Lebanon in October 1983; the assassination of Malcolm Kerr, president of the American University of Beirut, in 1984; the bombing of the U.S. Embassy Annex in East Beirut, Lebanon, in September 1984; and the kidnapping between 1982 and 1991 of 50 hostages who included American, British, French, and German nationals.

In Dammarell vs. the Islamic Republic of Iran, the court of Judge John D. Bates decided on May 12, 2005, for the plaintiffs and ordered Iran to pay damages, including $13,449,000 to members of the Stevens family, including her three siblings, the estate of Stevens, and the estate of her late father, Hazen Stevens. The Iranian government did not respond to the case, and did not pay.

=== Other similar cases ===
On April 28, 2015, the journalist Kai Bird, writing in The New York Times, discussed Dammarell v. the Islamic Republic of Iran (2003), in conjunction with a second case, Peterson v. the Islamic Republic of Iran (2007). The latter case was filed by one thousand plaintiffs, relatives of the 241 people killed in the bombing of the U.S. Marine barracks on October 23, 1983. Bird argued that the failure of the Iranian government to pay settlements in both cases would pose for the administration of U.S. president Barack Obama "a major stumbling block to any diplomatic resolution of Washington's troubled relations with Iran" at a time when the member states of the U.N. Security Council were negotiating over Iran's nuclear program (see Iran Nuclear Deal Framework).

Bird also claimed that Ali Reza Asgari, the Iranian Revolutionary guard identified as having masterminded the embassy attack in which Stevens and others died, later defected to the United States. Without citing his sources, Bird claimed that President George W. Bush authorized granting asylum and witness protection to Asgari in return for information about the Iranian nuclear program. The Central Intelligence Agency (CIA) rejected Bird's claims through a spokesperson. Claims about Asgari continued to surface, as in a March 10, 2019 article in The Hill that urged President Donald J. Trump to expose details that could bear upon the kidnapping of the former FBI agent and CIA consultant Robert Levinson who disappeared in Iran in 2007. New evidence surfaced in 2020, however, which suggested that Levinson had died in Iranian custody some time before.

== Legacy ==
During her time as a doctoral student at Penn, Stevens introduced her mentor, Roger Allen, to the novels of the Saudi-Iraqi writer, Abdul Rahman Munif. In 1987, Roger Allen published a translation of Munif's Endings, and dedicated it to Stevens's memory.

=== Stevens Memorial Fund ===
Friends, family, and professors established a Janet Lee Stevens Memorial Fund at the University of Pennsylvania. The fund intended to honor Stevens's legacy of fostering cultural understanding of the Arab world. Professor Thomas Naff originally administered the award, following a nomination procedure which awarded an individual outside the university a $1000 prize for promoting Arab-American understanding.

The first winner of this award, in 1986, was Gail Pressberg of the American Friends Service Committee. The second winner of the Janet Lee Stevens Memorial Award, in 1987, was Edward Said, the Palestinian-American literary and music critic, political advocate, and theorist of Orientalism. In 1993, the winners of this award were Jack Shaheen, journalist, professor of mass communications, and author of the book Reel Bad Arabs (about Orientalist portrayals of Arabs in American cinema) and Grace Halsell (journalist and author of Journey to Jerusalem and other books).

Beginning in 1996, when George McGovern, Senator of South Dakota and 1972 Democratic party nominee for U.S. president, came to speak at Penn, the Janet Lee Stevens Fund supported an annual lecture series. Other distinguished speakers included Professor John L. Esposito, founding director of the Center for Muslim-Christian Understanding at Georgetown University, who lectured on "The Islamic Threat: Myth or Reality" in 2003. The final speaker in the series in 2005 was the Palestinian-Israeli-American musician Simon Shaheen. Shaheen is a composer and performer of oud and violin, who also directs the Arab Music Retreat, an annual program of Arabic music hosted at Mount Holyoke College to promote cultural understanding through the study and performance of classical and neoclassical music from Egypt, Syria, Lebanon, Palestine, and Jordan.

Since 2002, the Janet Lee Stevens Fund has supported an annual grant program at the University of Pennsylvania for an MA or PhD student who demonstrates academic excellence, a commitment to Arabic study, and a record of promoting cultural understanding. It was originally called "The Janet Lee Stevens Award for the Promotion of American-Arab Understanding". Past winners include the literary scholar John Joseph Henry ("Chip") Rossetti, translator of works including Bahaa Abdelmagid's novellas Saint Theresa and Sleeping with Strangers (American University in Cairo Press, 2010); the folklorist Dana Hercbergs, author of Overlooking the Border: Narratives of Divided Jerusalem (Wayne State University Press, 2018); the political scientist Murad Idris, author of War for Peace: Genealogies of a Violent Ideal in Western and Islamic Thought (Oxford University Press, 2019); and the sociolinguist Uri Horesh, co-editor of The Routledge Handbook of Arabic Sociolinguistics (Routledge, 2019).

=== Awards and recognition ===
The Washington DC Abdorrahman Boroumand Center for promoting human rights and democracy in Iran features Stevens in its database called "Omid, a Memorial in Defense of Human Rights in Iran". Founded in 2002, this database originally included people whom it described as "victims of the Islamic Republic" and its human rights abuses since 1979, and also by all Iranian governments since December 10, 1948, when General Assembly of the United Nations adopted the UN Declaration of Universal Human Rights with Iran as a signatory.

Peace Monuments around the World listed Stevens among "77 Notable Peacemakers in Palestine and Israel".

== See also ==
- 1983 United States Embassy Bombing in Beirut
- Sabra and Shatila Massacre
