= Deir Qanoun an-Naher =

Deir Qanoun an-Naher دير قانون النهر
- Municipality
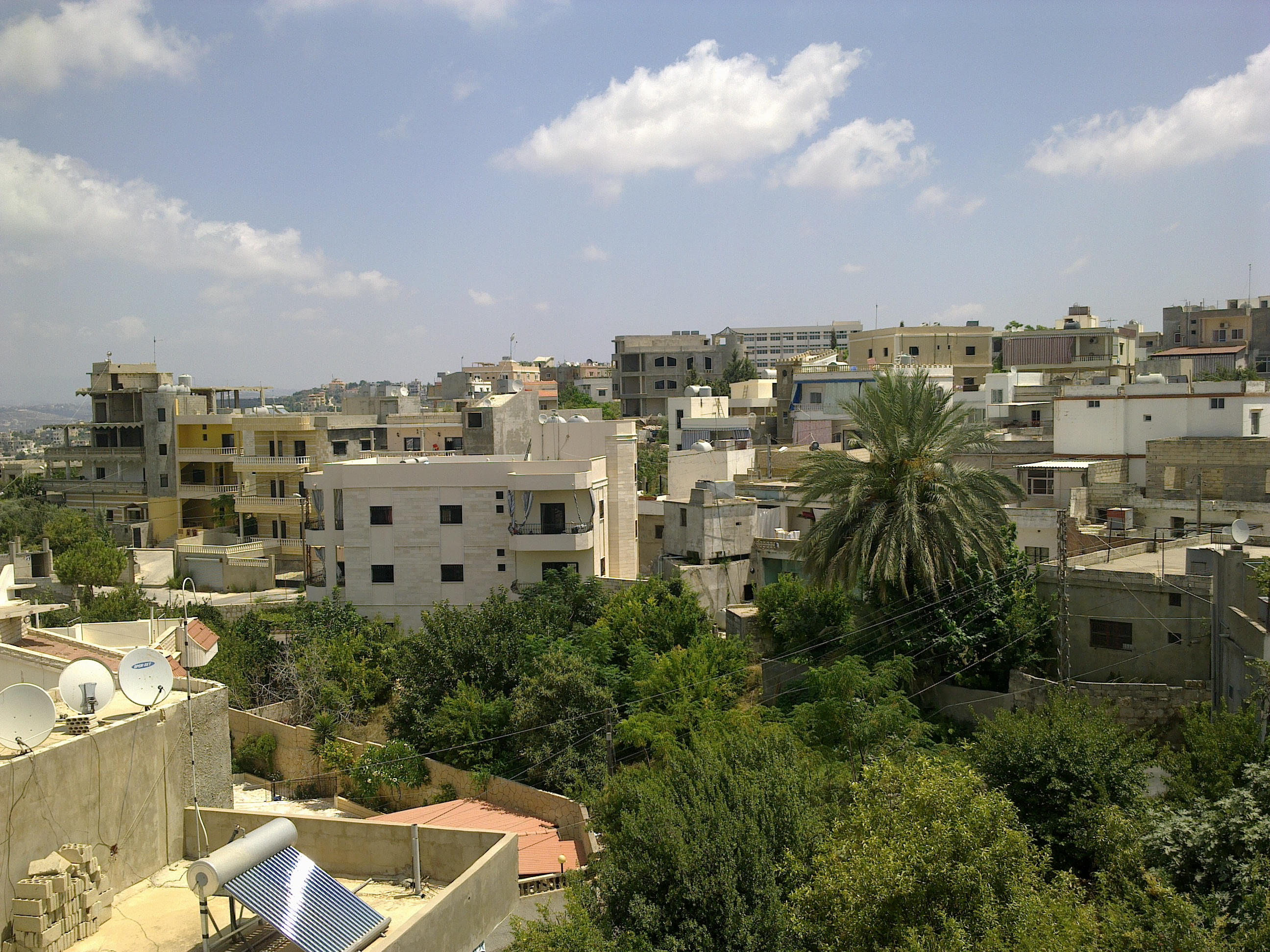
- Deir Qanoun an-Naher, 2012

- Location within Lebanon
- Coordinates: 33°17′56″N 35°18′53″E
- Grid position: 110/152 L
- Country: Lebanon
- Governorate: South Governorate
- District: Tyre District
- Elevation: 260 m (850 ft)
- Time zone: UTC+2 (EET)
  - Summer (DST): UTC+3 (EEST)
- Dialing code: +9617

Deir Qanoun an-Naher (Arabic: دير قانون النهر, romanized: Dayr Qānūn an-Nahir) is a municipality in Southern Lebanon, located in Tyre District, Governorate of South Lebanon.

== Etymology ==
According to E. H. Palmer in 1881, Deir Kânûn meant: the convent of the rule (canon).

== History ==
In the early 1860s, Ernest Renan noted here a decorated Sarcophagus.

In 1875, Victor Guérin found the village to be inhabited by 400 Metualis. He further noted: "Here I saw an ancient rock-cut basin, many cut-stones built up in private houses or forming the enclosure of gardens and cisterns, and, on the surface of a block lying on the ground, figures carved, to the number of five, each in a different frame. Unfortunately they are much mutilated by time and rough usage. The best preserved has the head surmounted by the high Egyptian coiffure known under the name of pschent, and holds in one hand a sort of curved stick."

In 1881, the PEF's Survey of Western Palestine (SWP) described it: "A village, built of stone, situated on the top of a hill, surrounded by gardens, fig-trees, olives, and arable land, containing about 250 Metawileh; water supply from springs, birket, and cisterns."

== Demographics ==
In 2014 Muslims made up 99.71% of registered voters in Deir Qanoun an-Naher. 99.27% of the voters were Shiite Muslims.

== People from Deir Qanoun an-Naher ==
- Hashem Safieddine
- Ahmad Qasir

== Bibliography ==
- Conder, C.R.; Kitchener, H.H. (1881). The Survey of Western Palestine: Memoirs of the Topography, Orography, Hydrography, and Archaeology. Vol. 1. London: Committee of the Palestine Exploration Fund.
- Guérin, V. (1880). Description Géographique Historique et Archéologique de la Palestine (in French). Vol. 3: Galilee, pt. 2. Paris: L'Imprimerie Nationale.
- Palmer, E.H. (1881). The Survey of Western Palestine: Arabic and English Name Lists Collected During the Survey by Lieutenants Conder and Kitchener, R. E. Transliterated and Explained by E.H. Palmer. Committee of the Palestine Exploration Fund.
- Renan, E. (1864). Mission de Phénicie (in French). Paris: Imprimerie impériale.
