= The Little Drummer Girl (novel) =

1983 spy novel by John le Carré

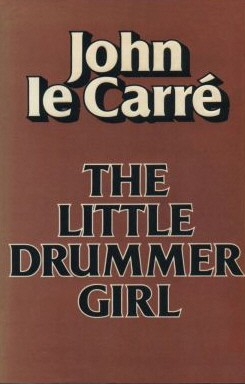
- First UK edition
- Author: John le Carré
- Cover artist: Jeffeson Godwin
- Genre: Spy fiction
- Publisher: Hodder & Stoughton (UK)
- Publication date: 1 March 1983
- Publication place: United Kingdom
- Media type: Print (hardback and paperback)
- Pages: 430 (hardback edition)
- ISBN: 0-340-32847-9 (UK hardback edition)
- OCLC: 9424294
- LC Class: PR6062.E33 L43 1984

The Little Drummer Girl is a spy novel by British writer John le Carré, published in 1983. The story follows Charlie, an English actress and double agent working on behalf of the Israeli intelligence agency, and the manipulations of Martin Kurtz, an Israeli spymaster who intends to kill Khalil, a Palestinian terrorist who masterminds bombings on Jewish-related targets in Europe.

The novel has been adapted into a 1984 film starring Diane Keaton, and a 2018 television series directed by Park Chan-wook and starring Florence Pugh.

== Plot summary ==
Martin Kurtz, an Israeli spy, recruits Charmian "Charlie" Ross, a 26-year-old radical left-wing English actress from a privileged background, as part of an elaborate scheme to eliminate Khalil, a Palestinian terrorist.

As the first step in the plan, Kurtz's unit, abducts, interrogates, and kills Khalil's younger brother Salim. Joseph, Charlie's case officer, then impersonates Salim and travels around Europe with Charlie to make Khalil believe that Charlie and Salim are lovers.

Khalil discovers Salim is dead and believes that Charlie was having an affair with Salim before his death. He contacts Charlie and arranges for her to be taken to a Palestinian refugee camp. She becomes more sympathetic to the Palestinian cause, and her divided loyalties bring her close to collapse.

Charlie trains as a bomber for Khalil's group, and is then sent on a mission to place a bomb at a lecture given by an Israeli moderate whose peace proposals are not to Khalil's liking. She carries out the mission under the Israelis' supervision, and as a result the Israelis are able to track Khalil down, enabling Joseph to kill him.

Charlie subsequently has a mental breakdown caused by the strain of her mission and her own internal contradictions, and the novel ends with Joseph, who has fallen in love with Charlie, contacting her once more.

== Adaptations ==
=== Film ===
The Little Drummer Girl was made into a feature film by George Roy Hill in 1984. It starred Diane Keaton as Charlie, Yorgo Voyagis as Joseph and Klaus Kinski as Kurtz. The film changes Charlie from an English woman in her 20s to an American in her 30s. The film was released on DVD in 2006.

=== Television ===
A BBC/AMC serial adaptation was directed by Park Chan-wook, starring Florence Pugh, Alexander Skarsgård, and Michael Shannon. It also stars Clare Holman, Kate Sumpter, Charles Dance, Simona Brown, Michael Moshonov, Amir Khoury, and Max Irons. The series debuted in November 2018.

== Reception ==
Some reviewers described The Little Drummer Girl as transcending the spy novel genre. "The Little Drummer Girl is about spies", said William F. Buckley, writing in The New York Times, "as Madame Bovary is about adultery or Crime and Punishment about crime."

John Grisham, when queried by Bill Moyers, picked The Little Drummer Girl as one of his favourite novels, saying,

I love to read John le Carré, the British guy who's really probably my favourite writer. The Little Drummer Girl is a book I read about every four or five years. It's just so clever and brilliantly plotted. It's the kinda book – and his writing is off the charts, the way he expresses himself and the way he describes people and dialogue – and every time I read that book, it inspires me to be better.

== Inspiration ==
Several real-life people have been mentioned as inspirations for the character of Charlie:

- British actress Vanessa Redgrave, who at the time of writing the novel was controversial for expressing her anti-Zionist views.
- John Le Carré's half-sister, Charlotte Cornwell, who was at the time a young actress with radical political views.
- American journalist, human rights advocate, and scholar of Arabic literature Janet Lee Stevens, who was nicknamed "the little drummer girl" by Palestinians, and who gave John le Carré a tour of the Sabra and Shatila refugee camps in Lebanon.
