= Ahmad Qasir =

Lebanese Hezbollah militant (1963–1982)

Ahmad Jafar Qasir
- أحمد جعفر قصير
- Born: 1963; Deir Qanoun an-Naher, Lebanon
- Died: 11 November 1982 (aged 18–19); Tyre, Lebanon
- Cause of death: Suicide attack
- Known for: Carrying out the first of the dual 1982–1983 Tyre headquarters bombings
- Movement: Hezbollah

Ahmad Jafar Qasir (Arabic: أحمد جعفر قصير, romanized: ʾAḥmad Jaʿfar Qaṣīr; 1963 – 11 November 1982) was a Lebanese militant who carried out the first of the dual 1982–1983 Tyre headquarters bombings against the Israel Defense Forces during the 1982 Lebanon War. On 11 November 1982, Qasir drove an explosive-filled Peugeot 504 into an Israeli military installation in Tyre before detonating it. In the aftermath of the suicide attack, 75 Israeli personnel were killed and another 27 were wounded, while 14 to 27 Arab (Lebanese and Palestinian) prisoners were killed and another 28 were wounded. Hezbollah claimed responsibility for Qasir's actions and has commemorated the day of his death as "Martyrs' Day" in Lebanon, while Iran formerly renamed a street in Tehran in his honour.

== Early life ==
Qasir was born in 1963 in Deir Qanoun an-Naher, Tyre District, to a family of Lebanese Shia Muslims.

== Militant career ==
At some point in his teenage years, Qasir joined Hezbollah and would go on to conduct his first and only attack during the 1982 Lebanon War. The bombing by Qasir in Tyre was the first major suicide attack in Hezbollah's history, resulting in 102 Israeli casualties and up to 55 Arab casualties. A year later, the same site was subject to another vehicular suicide bombing by Hezbollah, killing 28 Israeli personnel and 32 Lebanese prisoners, while wounding 40 others.

== Legacy ==
Hezbollah's erstwhile leader Hassan Nasrallah designated Qasir as "ʾAmīr al-Esteshhādiyyūn" (أمير الاستشهاديون, lit. 'Leader of the Martyrs') and directed the organization to observe 11 November as "Martyrs' Day" in Lebanon.

In Iran, Qasir was commemorated when Bucharest Street near Tehran's Arjantin Square was renamed after him, although it has since been removed for unknown reasons.

Two years after Qasir's death, his brother Hassan also carried out a suicide bombing that killed a number of Israeli soldiers during the South Lebanon conflict.

== See also ==
- Hezbollah–Israel conflict (since 1982)
