= 1983 US embassy bombing in Beirut =

1983 suicide bombing during the Lebanese Civil War

1983 U.S. Embassy bombing
- Part of the Lebanese Civil War
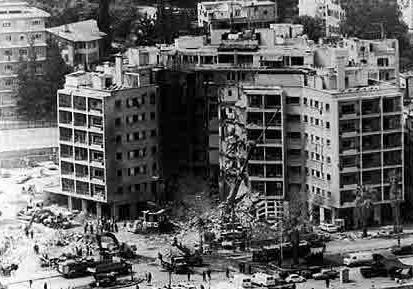
- US Embassy three days after the bombing

- Location of the attack site in Beirut
- Location: 33°54′5″N 35°29′6″E; Embassy of the United States, Beirut, Lebanon
- Date: April 18, 1983; 43 years ago 1:03 pm (GMT+2)
- Attack type: Suicide van bomb
- Weapon: Van packed with ≈2,000 pounds (910 kg) of explosives
- Deaths: 63 (+1 suicide bomber)
- Injuries: 120
- Perpetrators: Islamic Jihad Organization (claimed responsibility); Hezbollah (court finding, denied responsibility)

The April 18, 1983, United States Embassy bombing was a suicide bombing on the Embassy of the United States in Beirut, Lebanon, that killed 32 Lebanese, 17 Americans, and 14 visitors and passers-by. The victims were mostly embassy and CIA staff members, but also included several US soldiers and one U.S. Marine Security Guard. The attack came in the wake of an intervention in the Lebanese Civil War by the United States and other Western countries. The attacks were claimed by the Islamic Jihad Organization. The United States later believed they were perpetrated by Hezbollah, but Hezbollah denied responsibility.

It was the deadliest attack on a U.S. diplomatic mission up to that time, and was considered the beginning of Islamist attacks on U.S. targets.

== Bombing ==
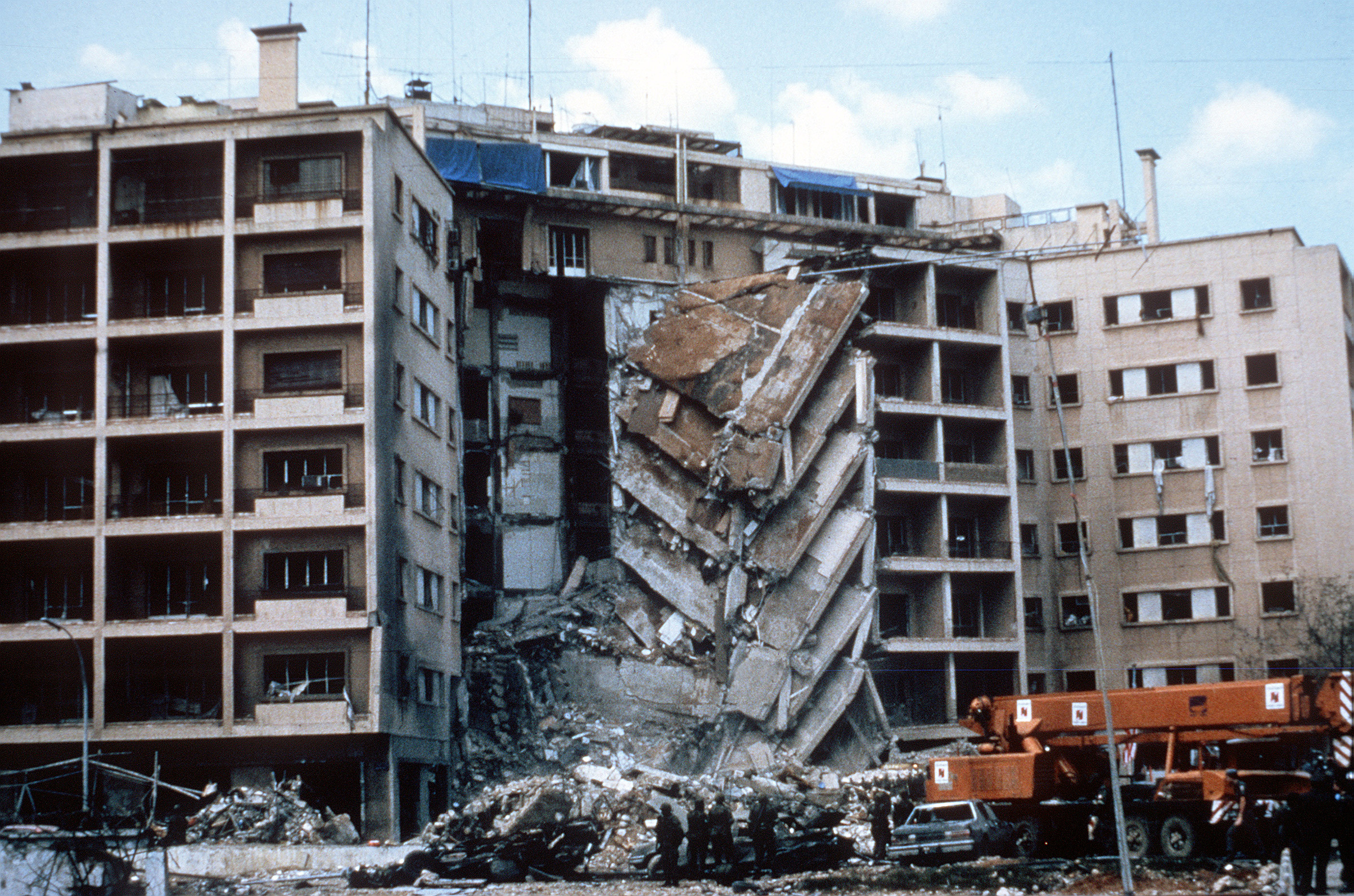
Damage to the U.S. Embassy after the bombing.

The car bomb was detonated by a suicide bomber driving a van packed with nearly 2,000 pounds (900 kg) of explosives at approximately 1:00 p.m. (GMT+2) April 18, 1983. The van, originally sold in Texas, bought used and shipped to the Gulf, gained access to the embassy compound and parked under the portico at the very front of the building, where it exploded. Former CIA operative Robert Baer's account says that the van broke through an outbuilding, crashed through the lobby door and exploded there.

The blast collapsed the entire central facade of the horseshoe-shaped building, leaving the wreckage of balconies and offices in heaped tiers of rubble, and spewing masonry, metal and glass fragments in a wide swath. The explosion was heard throughout West Beirut and broke windows as far as a mile away. Rescue workers worked around the clock, unearthing the dead and wounded.

== Death toll ==
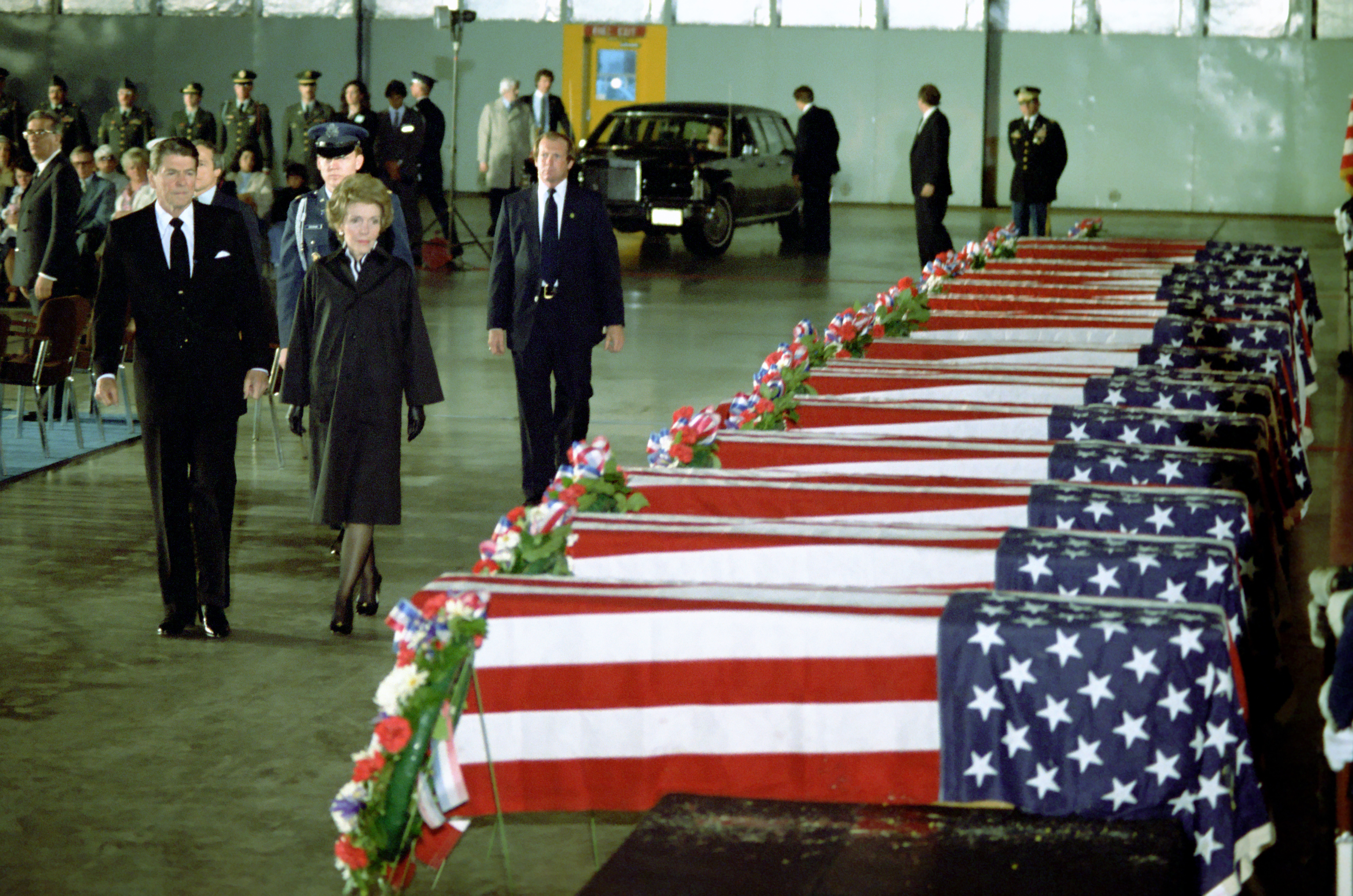
President Ronald Reagan and First Lady Nancy Reagan pay their respects and tribute to the thirteen American civilian and four U.S. military personnel victims of the embassy bombing.

A total of 63 people were killed in the bombing: 32 Lebanese employees, 17 Americans, and 14 visitors and passers-by. Of the Americans killed, eight worked for the Central Intelligence Agency, including the CIA's top Middle East analyst and Near East director, Robert Ames, Station Chief Kenneth Haas, James Lewis and most of the Beirut staff of the CIA.

Others killed included William R. McIntyre, deputy director of the United States Agency for International Development, two of his aides, and four US military personnel. Janet Lee Stevens, an American journalist, human rights advocate, and scholar of Arabic literature, was also among the dead. Lebanese victims included clerical workers at the embassy, visa applicants waiting in line and nearby motorists and pedestrians. An additional 120 or so people were wounded in the bombing.

== International response ==
U.S. president Ronald Reagan on April 18 denounced the "vicious terrorist bombing" as a "cowardly act," saying, "This criminal act on a diplomatic establishment will not deter us from our goals of peace in the region." Two envoys, Philip C. Habib and Morris Draper, continued their peace mission in Beirut to discuss Lebanese troop withdrawals with a renewed sense of urgency.

The next day, Ambassador Robert Dillon, who had narrowly escaped injury in the bombing, said: "Paramount among the essential business is our work for the withdrawal of all foreign forces from Lebanon." It is only by securing Lebanese government control over the country "that terrible tragedies like the one we experienced yesterday can be avoided in the future."

The president of Lebanon, Amine Gemayel, cabled President Reagan on April 18, saying, "The Lebanese people and myself express our deepest condolences to the families of the U.S. victims. The cross of peace is the burden of the courageous." Meanwhile, Lebanon asked the United States, France, and Italy to double the size of the peacekeeping force. As of March 16, it numbered about 4,800 troops, including some 1,200 US Marines, 1,400 Italian soldiers, 2,100 French paratroopers and 100 British soldiers.

Iran denied any role in the attack. Foreign Minister, Ali Akbar Velayati said, "We deny any involvement and we think this allegation is another propaganda plot against us."

On April 19, Prime Minister Menachem Begin of Israel sent President Reagan a message of condolence for the embassy bombing. "I write in the name of Israel when I express to you my deep shock at the terrible outrage which took the lives of so many of the American embassy in Beirut yesterday." Defense Minister Moshe Arens, was quoted by Israeli radio that he told the cabinet the attack "justified Israel's demands for security arrangements in Lebanon." Minister Yitzhak Shamir of Israel called the embassy bombing "shocking" but added that, "In Lebanon nothing is surprising. I think the lesson is simple and understood. The security problems in Lebanon are still most serious, and terrorist organizations will continue to operate there, at times with great success."

== U.S. economic aid ==
The House Foreign Affairs Committee April 19 voted to approve $251 million in additional economic and military aid for Lebanon, as requested by the administration. But it attached an amendment to the bill that would force the White House to seek approval for any expanded US military role.

The Senate Foreign Relations Committee followed suit April 20, approving the aid request but attaching an amendment that required the president to obtain congressional authorization for "any substantial expansion in the number or role of US armed forces in Lebanon or for the creation of a new, expanded or extended multinational peacekeeping force in Lebanon." If Congress did not act jointly on such a request within 60 days, however, the increase would then take effect automatically.

The Senate amendment was sponsored as a compromise by the committee's chairman, Republican Charles H. Percy of Illinois. It prevented a move by the committee's ranking Democrat, Claiborne Pell of Rhode Island, to extend the 1973 War Powers Resolution to Lebanon. On April 20, Pell said he would have had the votes to apply the resolution to US Marines in Lebanon. The law limited presidential commitment of troops in hostile situations to a maximum of 90 days unless Congress specifically approved their use.

Deputy Secretary of State Kenneth W. Dam, in a letter to the committee, had argued forcefully against use of the War Powers Resolution. Dam said it would "amount to a public finding that US forces will be exposed to imminent risk of involvement in hostilities", which "could give entirely the wrong public impression" of US expectations for Lebanon's future. Several influential congressmen had been urging an end to the US military role in Lebanon. After the embassy bombing, April 19, Republican Senator Barry Goldwater of Arizona said, "I think it's high time we bring the boys home."

== Aftermath ==
A pro-Iranian group calling itself the Islamic Jihad Organization took responsibility for the bombing in a telephone call to a news office immediately after the blast. The anonymous caller said, "This is part of the Iranian Revolution's campaign against imperialist targets throughout the world. We shall keep striking at any crusader presence in Lebanon, including the international forces." The group had earlier taken responsibility for a grenade attack in which five U.S. members of the international peacekeeping force had been wounded.

Judge John Bates of the U.S. District Court in Washington, D.C., on September 8, 2003, awarded in a default judgment $123 million to 29 American victims and family members of Americans killed in the bombing. Judge Royce Lamberth of the US District Court in Washington, D.C., on May 30, 2003, stated that the bombing was carried out by the militant group Hezbollah with the approval and financing of senior Iranian officials, paving the way for the victims to seek damages. Iran was not present in court to challenge witnesses nor present evidence of their own.

Hezbollah has long denied responsibility for the bombing. It's spiritual leader, Mohammad Hussein Fadlallah, insisted that Hezbollah "stood for moderation and restraint".

Following the attack, the embassy was moved to a supposedly more secure location in East Beirut. However, on September 20, 1984, another car bomb exploded at this embassy annex, killing twenty Lebanese and two American soldiers.

The April bombing was not the first suicide attack in the region. In December 1981 a suicide bomber attacked the Iraqi embassy in Beirut. Around 30 people were killed, among them the Iraqi ambassador to Lebanon. Another 95 people were injured. In December, 1982, a suicide bomber blew up the Israeli army headquarters in Tyre. Around 75 Israeli soldiers and security personnel were killed in the blast. Over the next eight months after the US embassy blast, several other suicide attacks occurred, including one against the US and French embassies in Kuwait, a second attack on Israeli Army's headquarters in Tyre, and the extremely destructive attacks on the US Marine and French Paratrooper barracks in Beirut on October 23, 1983.

Along with the Marine Barracks bombing, the 1983 US Embassy bombing prompted the Inman Report, a review of overseas security for the US Department of State. This in turn prompted the creation of the Bureau of Diplomatic Security and the Diplomatic Security Service within the State Department.

== See also ==
- Attacks on the United States
- 1983 Beirut barracks bombings
- 1984 United States embassy annex bombing in Beirut
- List of extrajudicial killings and political violence in Lebanon
- History of Hezbollah
- List of embassy attacks
- List of mass car bombings
- 2013 Iranian embassy bombing
