= Augustus Richard Norton =

American professor and army officer (1946–2019)

- Born: September 2, 1946; New York City
- Died: February 20, 2019 (aged 72)
- Burial place: Arlington National Cemetery
- Spouse: Deanna Norton
- Military career
- Other work: professor of international relations and anthropology

Augustus Richard Norton (September 2, 1946 – February 20, 2019) was an American professor and army officer. He was a professor of international relations and anthropology at the Pardee School of Global Studies at Boston University. He was best known for his writing on Middle East politics, and as an occasional commentator on U.S. policy in the Middle East.

== Background ==
Norton was born in New York City, New York in Brooklyn.

He was a graduate of the University of Miami.

After being commissioned from the ranks in 1967, Norton served two combat tours in Vietnam as an airborne infantry officer. In 1980-81, he served as an unarmed United Nations observer with UNTSO in southern Lebanon.

Norton received his PhD from the University of Chicago in 1984.

== Academic career ==
In 1981, he joined the faculty of West Point, where he became a professor of political science. He also taught West Point's only anthropology course. He retired in 1993 with the rank of colonel to join the faculty of Boston University. He retired from BU in 2017.

In 1992, Norton launched the “Civil Society in the Middle East Project” at New York University. The project was supported by the Ford Foundation. Prof. Denis J. Sullivan called the project "field-changing" and it resulted in the publication of two volumes on civil society in the region.

In 2006, Norton was an advisor the Iraq Study Group, also known as the Baker-Hamilton Commission.

He served as the founding chairman of the executive committee of the Boston Consortium for Arab Region Studies (BCARS). BCARS was founded in 2013.

== Bibliography ==
- Hezbollah : a short history. 2007.
- Civil Society in the Middle East, 2 vols., 1995, 1996, 2005
- Amal and the Shi'a: Struggle for the Soul of Lebanon, 1987

=== Critical studies and reviews of Norton's work ===
Hezbollah : a short history

- Max Rodenbeck, "Lebanon's Agony" The New York Review of Books 54/11 (28 June 2007) : 10-14
