= 1982–1983 Tyre headquarters bombings =

Dual suicide attacks against Israeli troops in Lebanon

The Tyre headquarters bombings were two suicide bombings against the Israel Defense Forces' headquarters building in Tyre, Lebanon, in 1982 and 1983. The blasts killed 104 Israelis and 47–59 Lebanese, wounded 95 people, and were some of the worst losses ever for the IDF. The second attack occurred in November 1983 and was attributed to Hezbollah.

== First bombing ==
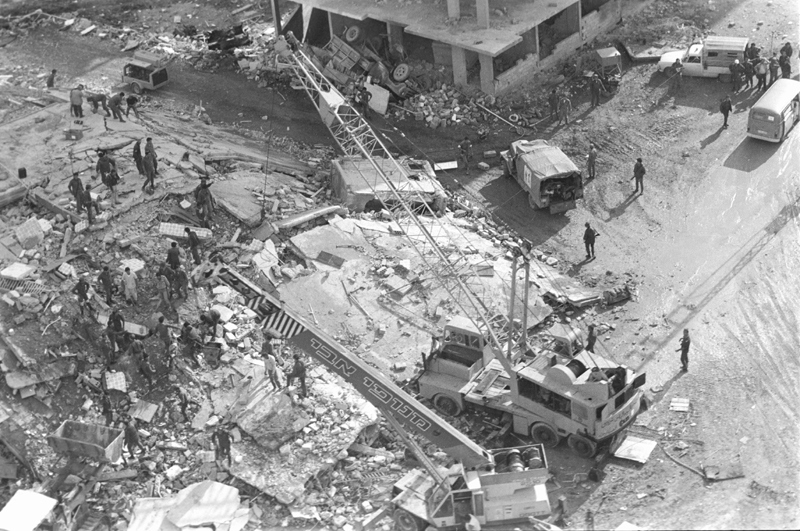
The first Tyre bombing disaster, the explosion of the military government building in Tyre on November 11, 1982

After invading Lebanon in June, the Israeli military set up command posts to run the cities they occupied. On November 11, 1982, a Peugeot 504 car packed with explosives struck the seven-story building being used by the Israeli military to govern Tyre. The explosion leveled the building and killed 75 Israeli soldiers, border policemen, and Shin Bet agents. In addition, anywhere from 14–27 Lebanese and Palestinian prisoners that were being held by Israel were killed. The injured included 27 Israelis and 28 Arabs.

The Israeli government said soon after the blast, and insisted until 2024, that the explosion was an accident resulting from gas cylinders exploding. This is contrary to the three witnesses who saw the Peugeot speed to the building, the identification of the car's parts in the rubble of the building, and the existence of a Shin Bet report detailing the Hezbollah preparations for the bombing.

In July 2024, a joint IDF-Shin Bet-police investigation concluded it was "highly probable" that the explosion was caused by a suicide bomber driving a car packed with at least 50 kg of explosives, including gas canisters, into the ground floor of the building and detonating. The investigation indicated 76 Israeli soldiers, Shin Bet, and border policemen, as well as 15 Lebanese detainees, were killed in the attack.

There is a monument near Baalbek, Lebanon, dedicated to 17-year-old Ahmad Qasir, the suicide bomber responsible for the attack. Hezbollah celebrates the attack annually on November 11, as Hezbollah's Martyr Day.

== Second bombing ==
Almost a year later, a nearly identical bombing happened in Tyre. On November 4, 1983, a suicide bomber drove a pickup truck filled with explosives into a Shin Bet building at an IDF base in Tyre. The explosion killed 28 Israelis and 32 Lebanese prisoners, and wounded about 40 others. The attack was carried out by the Shia Lebanese organization Hezbollah.

== See also ==
- 1983 Beirut barracks bombing
- 1983 United States embassy bombing
