= Arjantin Square =

Square in Tehran, Iran

Coordinates: 35°44′13″N 51°24′56″E

Arjantin Square is a square in north central Tehran. The area around the square is home to embassies, businesses, Medical labs, hospitals and the Arjantin Beihaghi Bus Terminal, which is central Tehran's main national bus terminal.

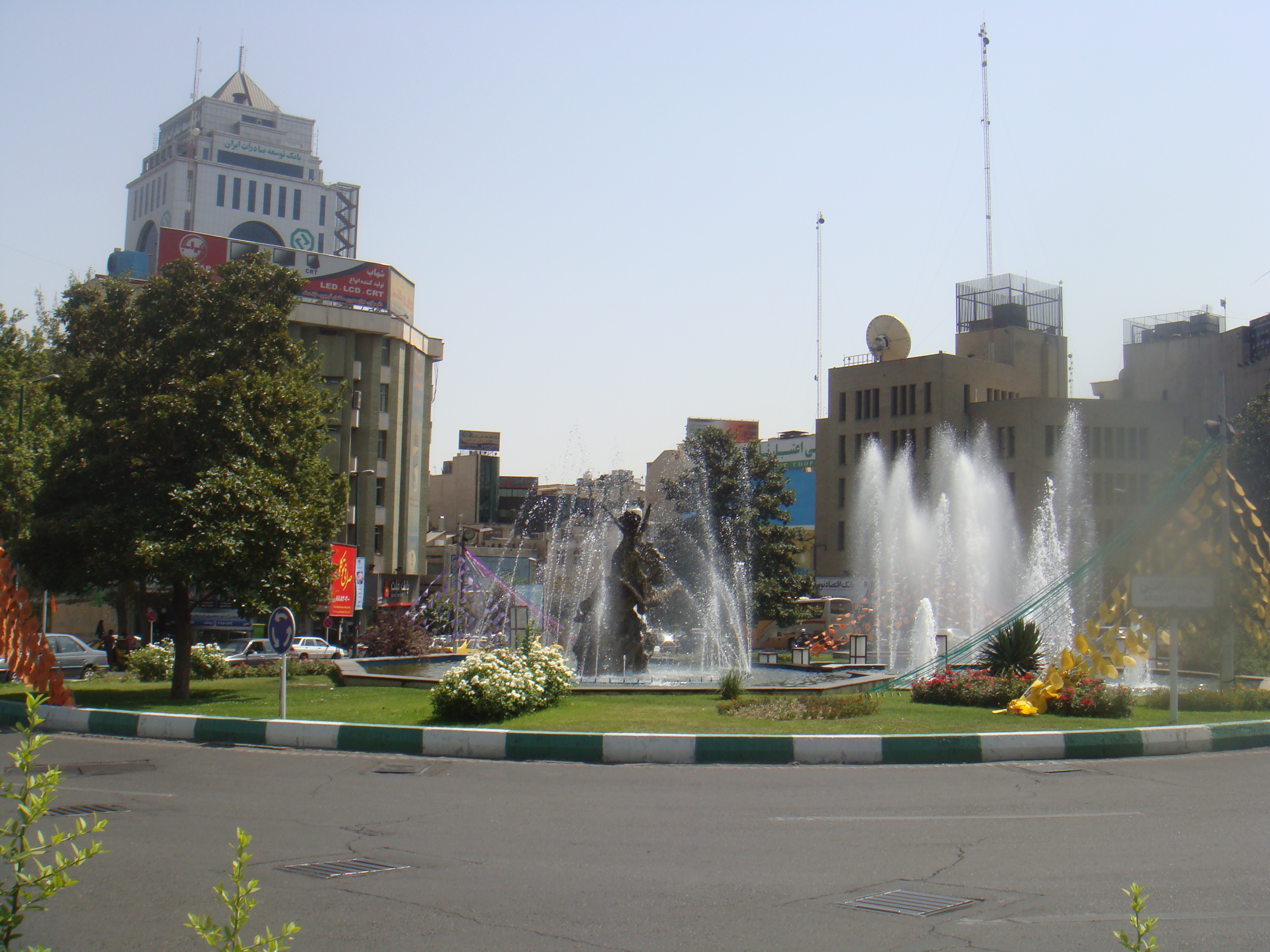
Argentinian Square (Tehran)

== Notable Places ==
The area is also home to one of Tehran's longest European style department stores called Hiland. Just south of the square is Bucharest Street, which is home to embassies including the Japanese and Australian Embassy.
