= 1984 US embassy bombing in Beirut =

Hezbollah attack on the US embassy in Beirut, Lebanon

1984 United States embassy annex bombing
- Part of the Lebanese Civil War
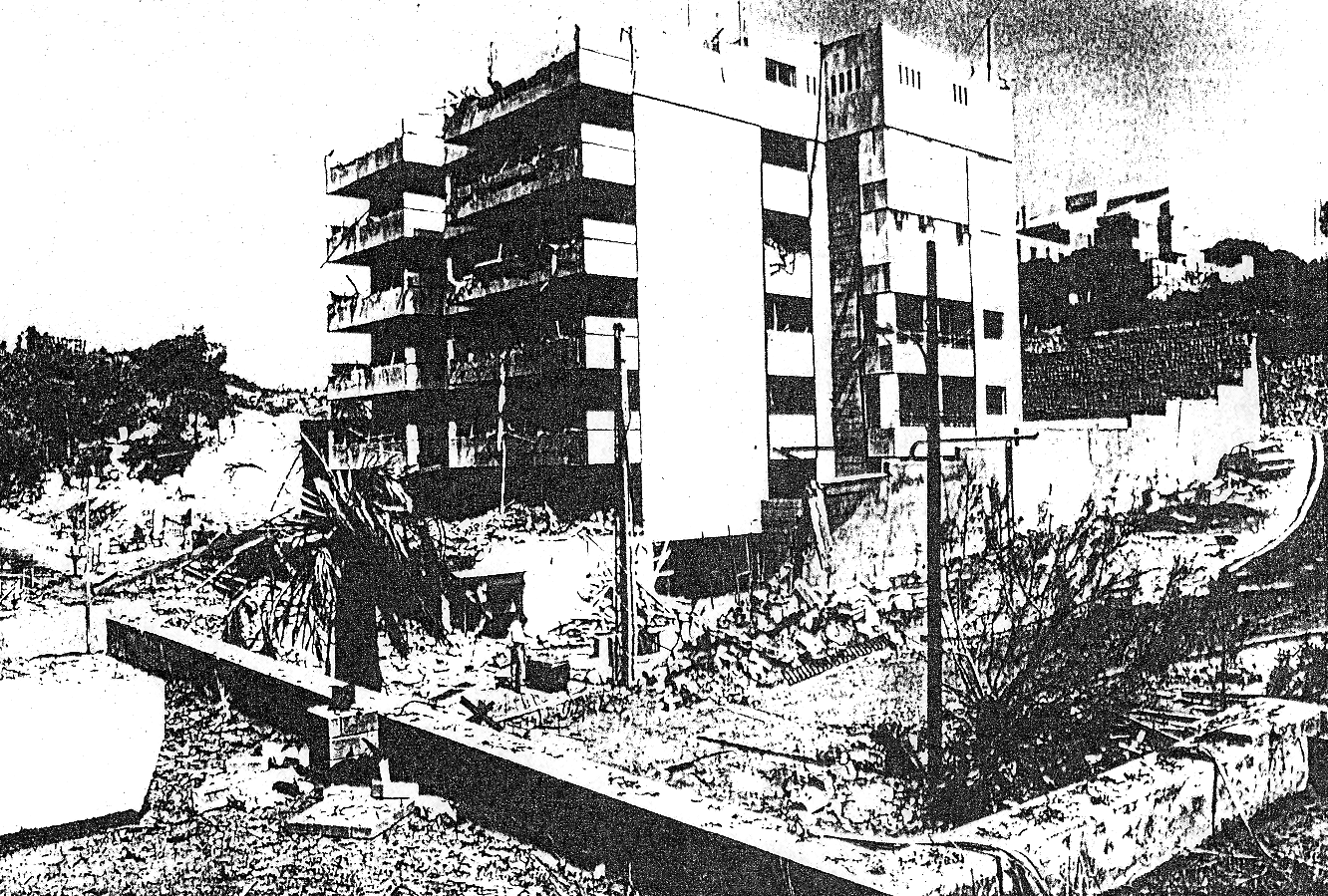
- The attack aftermath
- Location: Beirut, Lebanon
- Date: September 20, 1984; 42 years ago 11:44 am
- Attack type: Suicide van bomb
- Weapon: 1,360 kilograms (3,000 lb) explosive laden van
- Deaths: 23 (+1 bomber)
- Injuries: 90
- Perpetrators: Hezbollah, Islamic Republic of Iran

On September 20, 1984, the Shi'a Islamic militant group Hezbollah, with support and direction from the Islamic Republic of Iran, carried out a suicide car bombing targeting the US embassy annex in East Beirut, Lebanon during the Lebanese Civil War. The attack killed 23 people and 1 attacker.

Hezbollah had also used suicide car or truck bombs in the April 1983 US embassy bombing and the October 1983 Beirut barracks bombings.

== Bombing ==
In July 1984, the United States had relocated its embassy operations from West Beirut to the relative security of Aukar, a Christian suburb of East Beirut. When on September 20, 1984, the attacker sped his van laden with 3,000 pounds (1360 kg) of explosives toward the six-story embassy, crucial security measures had not yet been completed at the complex, including a massive steel gate. The van was heading for the entrance of the diplomatic facility, but did not get within ten yards of the building after the driver was shot by a bodyguard of the British ambassador and Lebanese embassy guards and lost control of the vehicle. The vehicle detonated at 11:44 a.m. after striking a parked van.

The explosion "ripped off the front of the embassy, shredding glass, bending steel bars and destroying cars in a nearby parking lot." The attack killed a total of 23 people (+1 suicide bomber). Only two of the dead were American: Chief Warrant Officer Kenneth V. Welch of the US Army and Petty Officer 1st Class Michael Ray Wagner of the US Navy, who were both assigned to the US Defense Attache Office in Beirut. The majority of those killed were Lebanese, "either local employees or people seeking visas". Of the injured, the US ambassador, Reginald Bartholomew, was slightly hurt, as well as the British ambassador, David Miers, who was meeting with Bartholomew at the time of explosion.

== Responsibility ==
The Islamic Jihad Organization (IJO) claimed responsibility for the attack in a telephone call a few hours after the explosion. The caller said, "The operation goes to prove that we will carry out our previous promise not to allow a single American to remain on Lebanese soil." The US government understood that Hezbollah had carried out the attack under the cover name of IJO with the support of Iran. Through satellite reconnaissance, US intelligence discovered that a mock-up of the annex had been created at the Iranian Revolutionary Guard-run Sheikh Abdullah barracks in Baalbek to practice for the attack.

== Legal cases ==
Under the amended Foreign Sovereign Immunities Act, victims of the bombing and their families have filed cases against the Islamic Republic of Iran, holding it responsible for its role in the attack and demanding compensation.

- Estate of Doe, et al. v Republic of Iran, et al. (2013) – 58 foreign national employees and one American employee that were killed or injured in the 1983 embassy bombing and 1984 embassy annex bombing are awarded $8.4 billion. The judge ruled "that the attacks were carried out by the terrorist group Islamic Jihad, known most commonly as Hezbollah, operating with Iranian support and encouragement."
- Brewer v. Islamic Republic of Iran (2009) – Security guard Richard Brewer and his family are awarded $310 million in damages. Brewer was injured in the bombing. The judge ruled "Hezbollah received substantial funds and support from Iran via its Ministry of Information and Security and the Iranian Revolutionary Guard Corps. This court concludes that defendants provided 'material support and resources' to Hezbollah."

== Reactions ==
- United States: The U.S. Navy dispatched the USS Shreveport (LPD-12), which had just completed a minesweeping mission in the Suez Canal and was diverted toward Beirut to assist in rescue operations.
- Israel offered its assistance to the United States, and Rambam Hospital in Haifa prepared to receive American casualties – the emergency department was cleared, the computerized patient registration system was converted to English, wards were placed on high alert, and both Israel Police and Military Police Corps forces were deployed to the hospital. Additionally, foreign television crews prepared for the arrival of American evacuees, but they did not arrive after U.S. Secretary of Defense Caspar Weinberger informed Defense Minister Yitzhak Rabin that assistance was not required. Weinberger thanked Rabin for the gesture.

== See also ==
- Attacks on the United States
- List of extrajudicial killings and political violence in Lebanon
- List of Islamist terrorist attacks
