= South Lebanon conflict (1985–2000) =

Conflict between Israel and Lebanon-based militant groups

South Lebanon conflict (1982–2000)
- Part of the Lebanese Civil War; Arab–Israeli (Israeli–Lebanese, Hezbollah–Israel, and Israeli–Palestinian) conflicts Iran–Israel proxy conflict
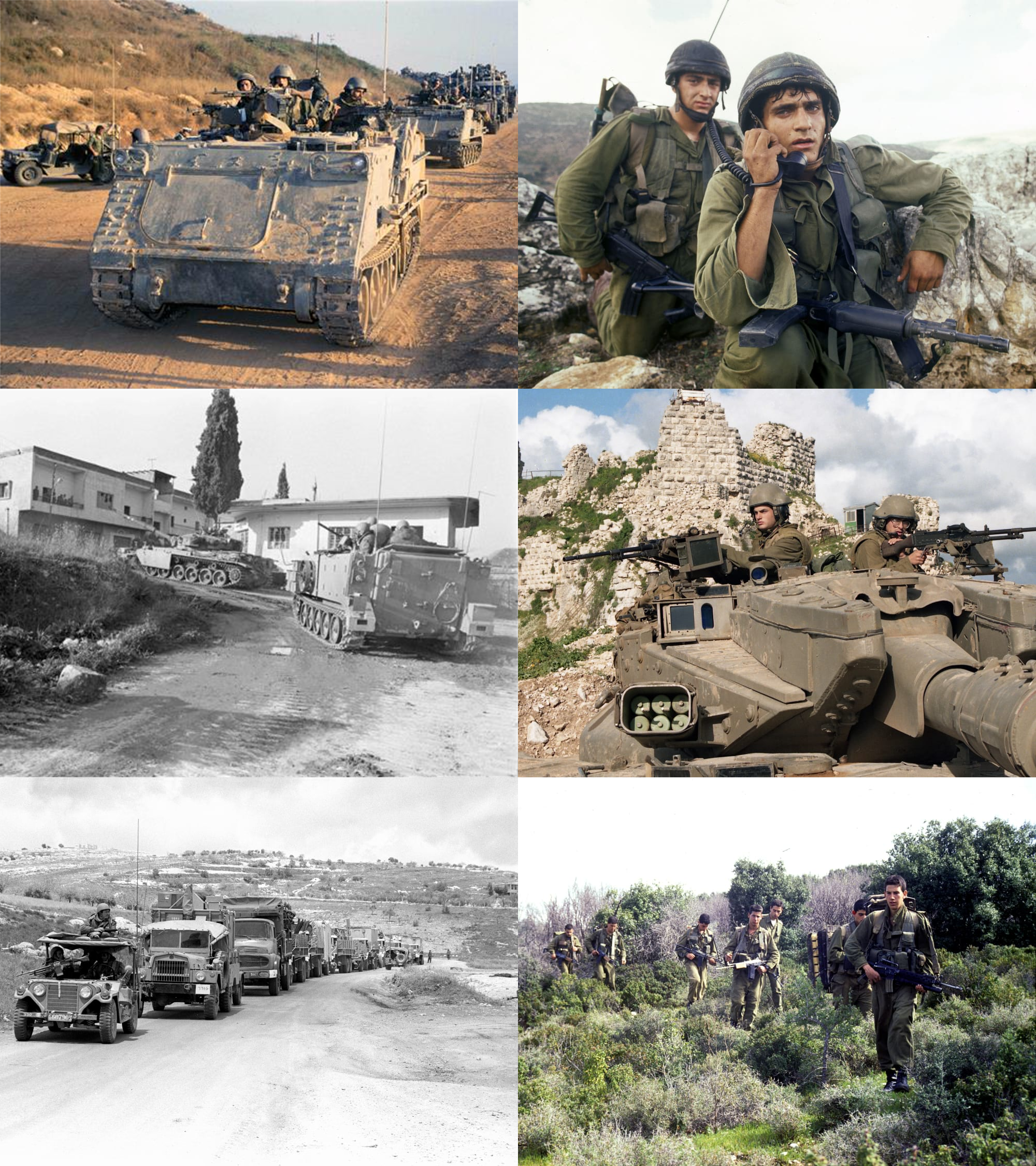
- Israeli forces during the conflict
Date	30 September 1982 or 1985 – 25 May 2000
Location	Southern Lebanon
Result	Hezbollah-led victory
Territorial changes	Collapse of the SLA and its provisional government; Israeli withdrawal and end of its occupation of Southern Lebanon

Belligerents
Israel; South Lebanon Army	Hezbollah; Amal; Jammoul; PFLP–GC

Commanders and leaders
Shimon Peres; Ariel Sharon; Ehud Barak; Erez Gerstein †; Antoine Lahad; Aql Hashem †	Abbas al-Musawi X; Hassan Nasrallah; Nabih Berri; George Hawi; Elias Atallah; Ahmed Jibril

Strength
1,000–1,500 troops; 2,500 troops	Unknown

Casualties and losses
Israel: 559 killed (256 in combat); 840 wounded SLA: 621 killed per SLA (1978–2000); 1,050 killed and 639 wounded per Hezbollah (1982–1999)	Hezbollah: 1,276 killed (1982–2000); ~1,000 wounded (1982–1999)
- 270 Lebanese civilians killed 500 Lebanese civilians wounded 7 Israeli civilians killed by rockets 1 US Navy diver killed

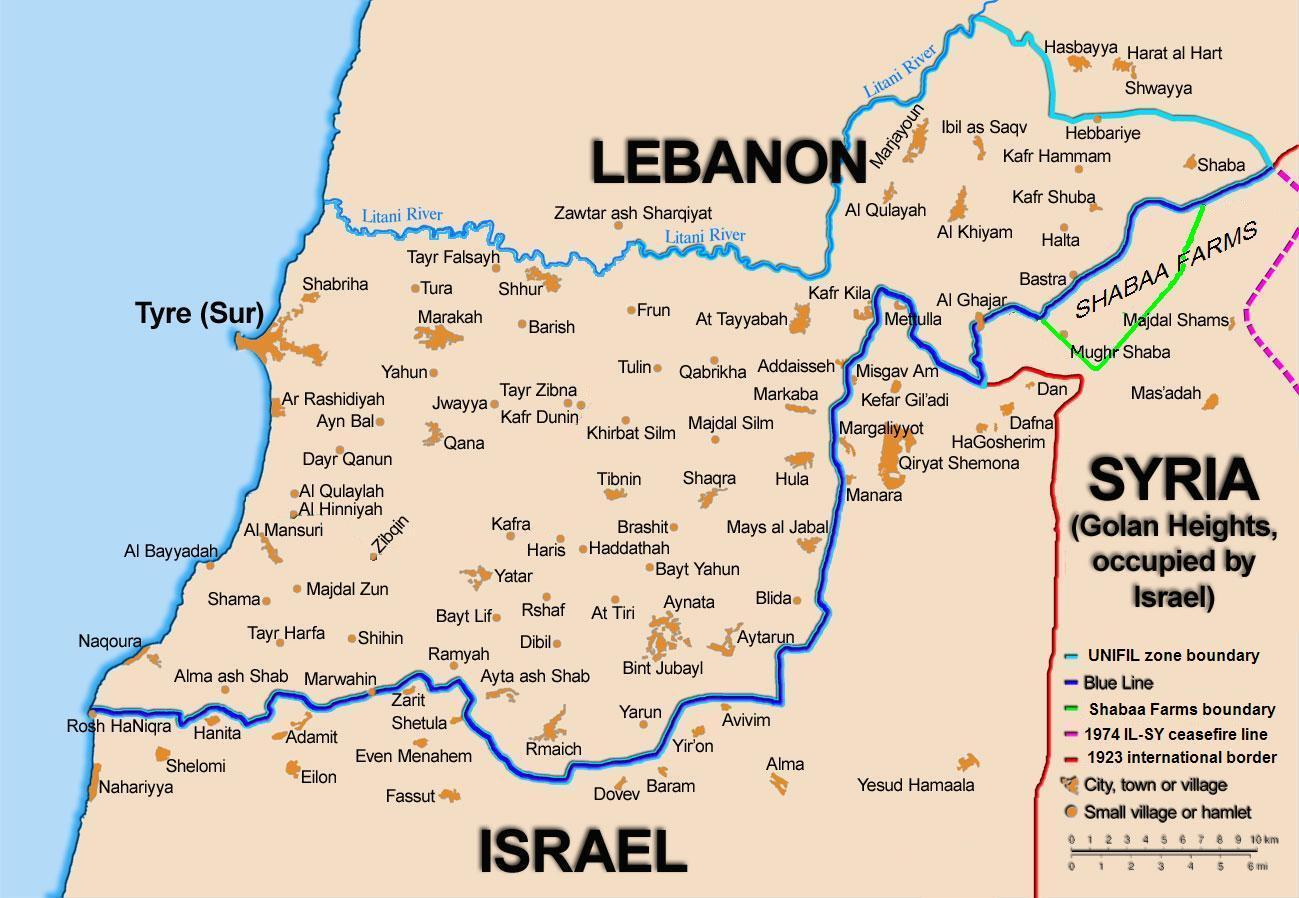
The Blue Line covers the Lebanese–Israeli border. An extension covers the Lebanese-Golan Heights border

The South Lebanon conflict was an armed conflict that took place in Israeli-occupied southern Lebanon from 1982 or 1985 until Israel's withdrawal in 2000. Hezbollah, along with other Shia Muslim and left-wing guerrillas, fought against Israel and its ally, the Catholic Christian-dominated South Lebanon Army (SLA). The SLA was supported militarily and logistically by the Israel Defense Forces (IDF) and operated under the jurisdiction of the Israeli-backed South Lebanon provisional administration, which succeeded the earlier Israeli-backed Free Lebanon State. Israel officially names the conflict the Security Zone in Lebanon Campaign and deems it to have begun on 30 September 1982, after the end of its "Operation Peace for Galilee". It can also be seen as an extension of the Lebanese Civil War (1975–1990).

Israel invaded Lebanon in 1978 and in 1982, to end the Palestinian insurgency in South Lebanon and support Lebanese Maronite Christians in the Lebanese Civil War. The 1982 invasion resulted in the Palestine Liberation Organization (PLO) leaving Lebanon and marked the beginning of Israeli occupation. Militant groups began attacking Israeli forces in southern Lebanon in September 1982. Amid rising casualties from guerrilla attacks, the IDF retreated south of the Awali river on 3 September 1983. The IDF began a phased withdrawal from Lebanon in February 1985. It withdrew to a "security zone" along the border on 29 April, and most IDF troops withdrew from the "security zone" on 10 June. A small number of IDF soldiers remained in the zone to support the SLA. Throughout its existence, there were about 1,500 IDF and 2,500 SLA troops in the "security zone" at any given time.

The occupation led to the creation of the Shia Islamist paramilitary group Hezbollah. It began waging a guerrilla war against the IDF and the SLA, with support from Iran and Syria. The IDF and the SLA engaged in counterinsurgency, but Israel had no long-term strategy. With Hezbollah increasingly targeting the Galilee with rockets, the official purpose of the Security Zone—to protect Israel's northern communities—seemed contradictory. Hezbollah also excelled at psychological warfare, often recording their attacks on Israeli troops. Israel launched two major operations in southern Lebanon during the 1990s: Operation Accountability in 1993 and Operation Grapes of Wrath in 1996. Following the 1997 Israeli helicopter disaster, the Israeli public began to seriously question whether the occupation of southern Lebanon was worth maintaining. The Four Mothers movement rose to the forefront of the public discourse, and played a leading role in swaying the public in favour of a complete withdrawal.

The Israeli government hoped that a withdrawal from the security zone could be carried out in the context of a wider agreement with Syria and, by extension, Lebanon. Talks with Syria failed. By 2000, following up on his promise during the 1999 Israeli general election, the new Israeli prime minister Ehud Barak unilaterally withdrew Israeli forces from southern Lebanon on 25 May 2000, in accordance with United Nations Security Council Resolution 425 of 1978. Israel's withdrawal resulted in the immediate and total collapse of the SLA, with many of its members escaping to Israel. The Lebanese government and Hezbollah consider the withdrawal incomplete until Israel withdraws from Shebaa Farms. In 2020, Israel recognized the conflict as an IDF military campaign.

== Background ==
Following the 1948 Arab–Israeli War, the 1949 Armistice Agreements were signed with United Nations mediation. The Lebanese–Israeli agreement created the armistice line, which coincided exactly with the existing international boundary between Lebanon and Palestine from the Mediterranean to the Syrian tripoint on the Hasbani River. From this tripoint on the Hasbani the boundary follows the river northward to the village of Ghajar, then northeast, forming the Lebanese–Syrian border. The southern line from the tripoint represents the Palestine–Syria border of 1923. Israeli forces captured and occupied 13 villages in Lebanese territory during the conflict, including parts of Marjayoun, Bint Jbeil, and areas near the Litani River, but withdrew following international pressure and the armistice agreement.

Although the Israel–Lebanon border remained relatively quiet, entries in the diary of Moshe Sharett point to a continued territorial interest in the area. On 16 May 1954, during a joint meeting of senior officials of the defense and foreign affairs ministries, Ben Gurion raised the issue of Lebanon due to renewed tensions between Syria and Iraq, and internal trouble in Syria. Dayan expressed his enthusiastic support for entering Lebanon, occupying the necessary territory and creating a Christian regime that would ally itself with Israel. The issue was raised again in 1956 discussions at the Protocol of Sèvres.

The Israeli victory in the 1967 Six-Day War vastly expanded their area occupied in all neighboring countries, with the exception of Lebanon. With the occupation of the Golan Heights, this extended the length of the effective Lebanon–Israel border. Although with a stated requirement for defense, later Israeli expansion into Lebanon under very similar terms followed the 1977 elections, which for the first time, brought the Revisionist Likud to power.

=== Emerging conflict between Israel and Palestinian militants ===
Beginning with the late 1960s and especially in the 1970s, following the defeat of the PLO in Black September in Jordan, displaced Palestinian militants affiliated with the Palestine Liberation Organization began to settle in South Lebanon. The unrestrained buildup of Palestinian militia, and the large autonomy they exercised, led to the popular term "Fatahland" for South Lebanon. Since the mid-1970s the tensions between the various Lebanese factions and Palestinians had exploded, resulting in Lebanese Civil War.

Following multiple attacks launched by Palestinian organizations in the 1970, which increased with the Lebanese Civil War, the Israeli government decided to take action. Desiring to break up and destroy this PLO stronghold, Israel briefly invaded Lebanon in 1978, but the results of this invasion were mixed. The PLO was pushed north of the Litani River. A buffer zone was created to keep them from returning, with the placement of the United Nations Interim Force in Lebanon (UNIFIL).

After earlier covert support, Israel established a second buffer with renegade Saad Haddad's Christian Free Lebanon Army enclave, initially based only in the towns of Marjayoun and Qlayaa. The now-public Israeli military commitment to the Christian forces was strengthened. For the first time, Israel received substantive adverse publicity in the world press due to damage in South Lebanon, in which some 200,000 Lebanese, mostly Shia Muslims, fled the area and ended up in the southern suburbs of Beirut. This indirectly resulted in the Syrian forces in Lebanon turning against the Christians in late June and complicated the dynamics of the ongoing Lebanese Civil War.

=== 1982 Israeli invasion of Lebanon ===
In 1982, the Israeli military began "Operation Peace for Galilee", a full-scale invasion of Lebanese territory. The invasion followed the 1978 Litani Operation, which gave Israel possession of the territory near the Israeli–Lebanese border. This follow-up invasion attempted to weaken the PLO as a unified political and military force, and eventually led to the withdrawal of PLO and Syrian forces from Lebanon.

By the end of this operation, Israel had control over Lebanon from Beirut southward, and attempted to install a pro-Israeli government in Beirut to sign a peace accord with it. This goal was not realized, partly because of the assassination of President Bachir Gemayel in September 1982, and the refusal of the Lebanese Parliament to endorse the accord.

The withdrawal of the PLO forces in 1982 forced some Lebanese nationalists to start a resistance against the Israeli army, led by the Lebanese Communist Party and the Amal movement. During this time, some Amal members started the formation of an Islamic group supported by Iran, that was the nucleus of the future "Islamic Resistance" that resulted in the creation of Hezbollah.

== Chronology ==
=== 1982–1985 occupation and emergence of Hezbollah ===
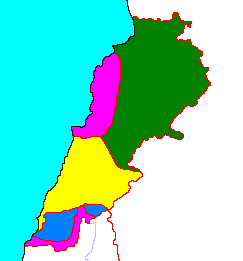
A map showing the power balance in Lebanon, October 1982: Green – controlled by Syria, purple – controlled by Christian groups, yellow – controlled by Israel, blue – controlled by the United Nations

Increased hostilities against the US resulted in the April 1983 US embassy bombing in Beirut. In response, the US brokered the May 17 Agreement, in an attempt to stall hostilities between Israel and Lebanon. This agreement eventually failed to take shape, and hostilities continued. In October, the United States Marines barracks in Beirut was bombed, usually attributed to the Islamic Resistance groups. Following this incident, the United States withdrew its military forces from Lebanon.

Suicide bombings became increasingly popular at this time, and were a major concern of the Israel Defense Forces (IDF) both near Beirut and in the South. Among the most serious were the two suicide bombings against the Israeli headquarters in Tyre, which killed 103 soldiers, border policemen, and Shin Bet agents, and killed 49–56 Lebanese. Israel believes those acts were among the first organized actions made by Shi'ite militants, later forming into Hezbollah. Subsequently, Israel withdrew from the Shouf Mountains, but continued to occupy Lebanon south of the Awali River.

An increased number of Islamic militias began operating in South Lebanon, launching guerrilla attacks on Israeli and pro-Israel militia positions. Israeli forces often responded with increased security measures and airstrikes on militant positions. Casualties on all sides steadily climbed. In a vacuum left with the eradication of PLO, the disorganized Islamic militants in South Lebanon began to consolidate.

The emerging Hezbollah, soon to become the preeminent Islamic militia, evolved during this period. Scholars disagree as to when Hezbollah came to be regarded as a distinct entity. Over time, a number of Shi’a group members were slowly assimilated into the organization, such as Islamic Jihad members, Organization of the Oppressed on Earth, and the Revolutionary Justice Organization.

=== Israeli withdrawal to southern Lebanon (1985) ===
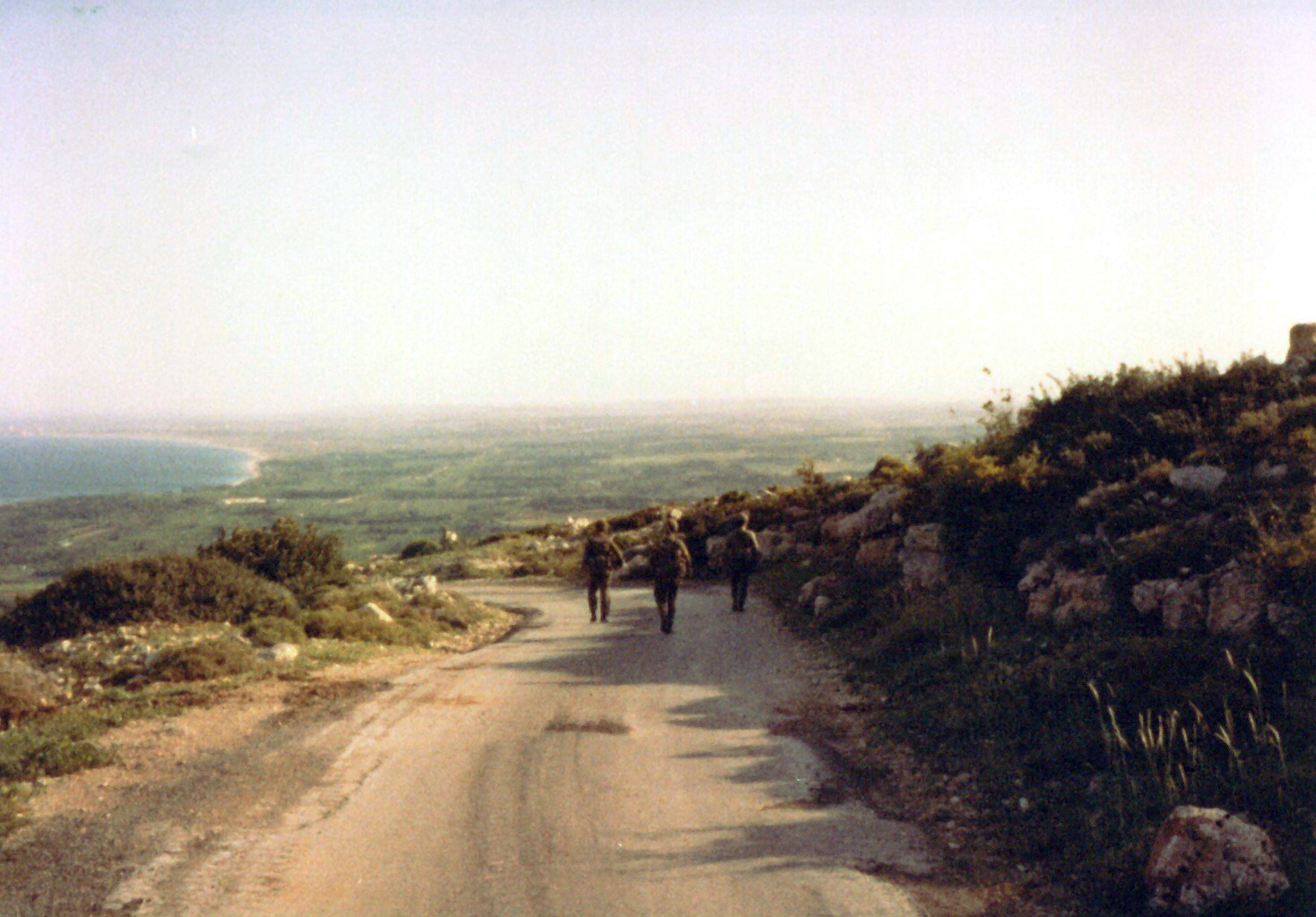
An IDF military patrol near Ras Biada, 1986

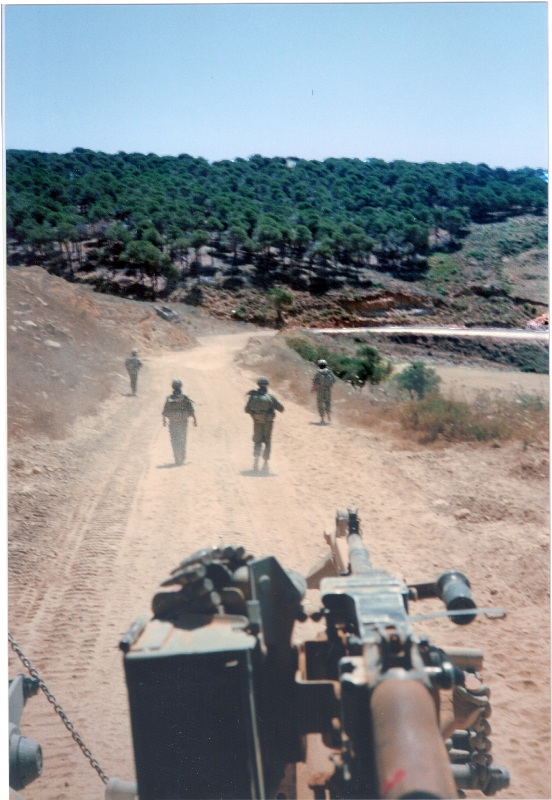
An IDF military patrol near Ayshiyeh Lebanon, 1993

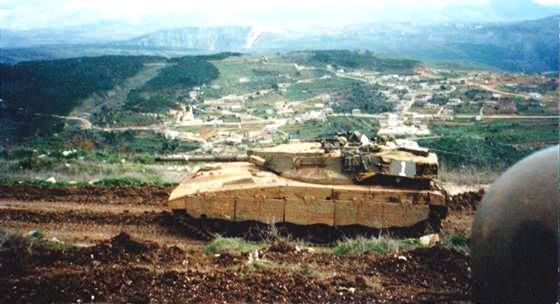
An Israeli tank position in Shamis al urqub near Aaichiye, South Lebanon, 1997

On 16 February 1985, Israel withdrew from Sidon and turned it over to the Lebanese Army. 15 Israelis were killed and 105 wounded during the withdrawal. Dozens of SLA members were also assassinated. Under the Iron Fist policy, Israel retaliated in a series of raids. On March 11, Israeli forces raided the town of Zrariyah, killing 40 men.

On March 10, a suicide bomber killed twelve Israeli soldiers from a convoy near Metula, inside Israel. From mid-February to mid-March, the Israelis lost 18 dead and 35 wounded. On 9 April, a Shiite girl drove a car bomb into an IDF convoy. The next day, a soldier was killed by a land mine. During the same period, Israeli forces killed 80 Lebanese guerrillas in five weeks. Another 1,800 Shi'as were taken as prisoners. Israel withdrew from the Bekaa valley on 24 April, and from Tyre on the 29th, but continued to occupy a security zone in Southern Lebanon.

On April 9, a female suicide bomber named Sana'a Mehaidli from the Syrian Social Nationalist Party blew herself up in Jezzine, killing two Israeli soldiers and injuring ten others.

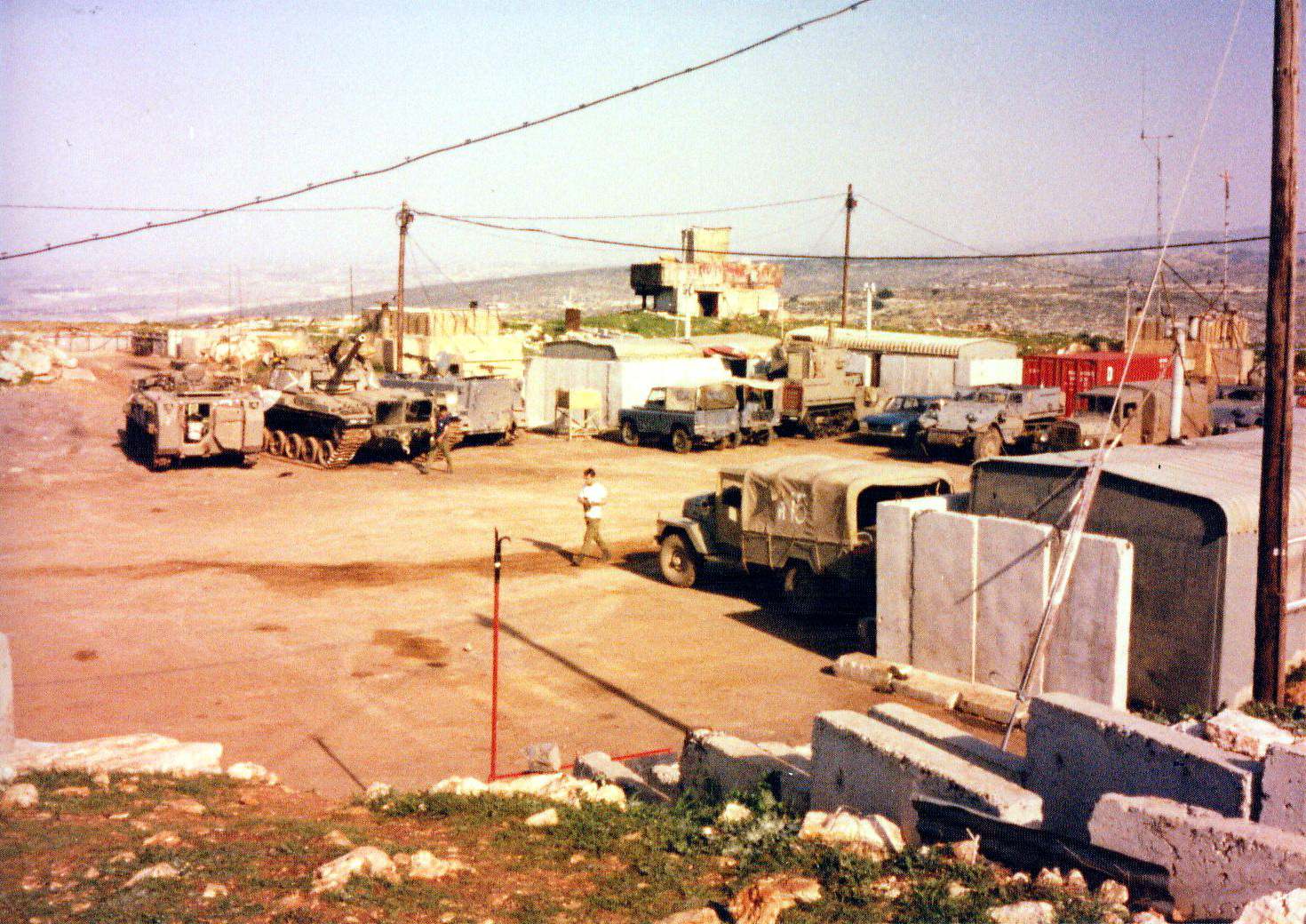
IDF military post Shakuf El-Hardun, 1986

=== Beginning of the Security Zone conflict (1985–1989) ===
In 1985, Hezbollah released an open letter to "The Downtrodden in Lebanon and in the World", which stated that the world was divided between the oppressed and the oppressors. The oppressors were named to be mainly the United States and Israel. This letter legitimized and praised the use of violence against the enemies of Islam, mainly the West.

Israeli and SLA forces in the security zone began to come under attack. The first major incident occurred in August 1985, when Lebanese guerrillas believed to have been from Amal ambushed an Israeli convoy: two Israeli soldiers and three of the attackers were killed in the ensuing firefight.

Lebanese guerrilla attacks increased, mainly the work of Hezbollah. Fighting the Israeli occupation included hit-and-run guerrilla attacks, suicide bombings, and the Katyusha rocket attacks on civilian targets in Northern Israel, including Kiryat Shmona. The Katyusha proved to be an effective weapon and became a mainstay of Hezbollah military capabilities in South Lebanon. The attacks resulted in both military and civilian casualties.

A considerable number of Lebanese guerrillas were killed fighting Israeli and SLA troops, and many were captured. Prisoners were often detained in Israeli military prisons, or by the SLA in the Khiam detention center, where detainees were often tortured. Lebanese prisoners in Israel were arrested and detained for participating in guerrilla movements, and many were held for long periods of time.

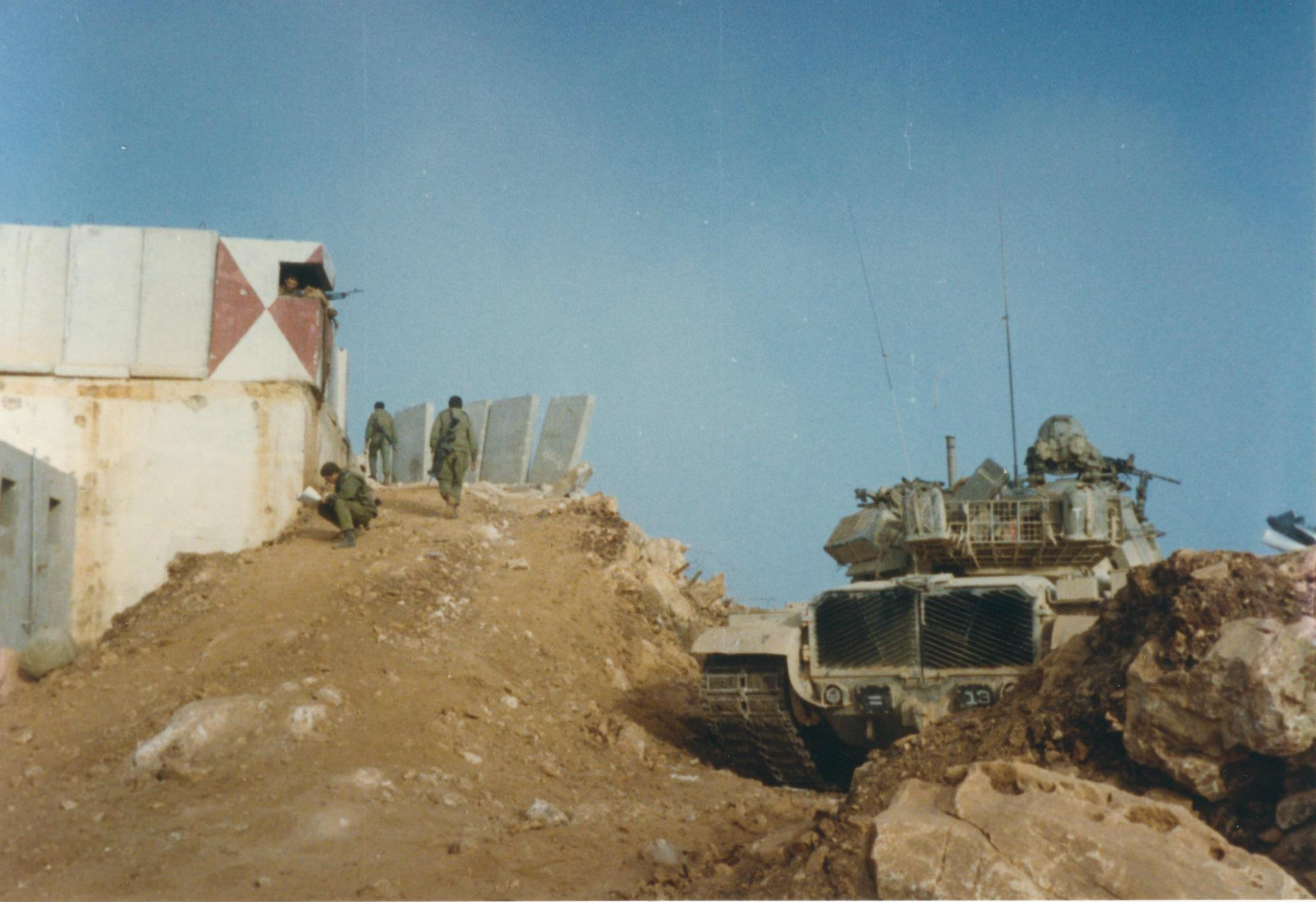
A SLA outpost, 1987

In 1987, Hezbollah fighters from the Islamic Resistance stormed and conquered an outpost in Bra'shit belonging to the South Lebanon Army in the security zone. A number of its defenders were killed or taken prisoner, and the Hezbollah flag was raised on top of it. A Sherman tank was blown up and a M113 armored personnel carrier was captured and driven triumphantly all the way to Beirut. In September 1987, Israeli aircraft bombed three PLO bases on the outskirts of the Ain al-Hilweh refugee camp, killing up to 41 people. An Israeli spokesman said the targets were being used by terrorist cells that were planning raids against Israel.

On 2 January 1988, Israeli airstrikes on Ain al-Hilweh and along the coast North of Sidon left 19 dead and 14 wounded. Three members of the PFLP-GC and three from the PSP were amongst those killed. Seven children and one woman were also killed. It was reported that the raids were retaliation for the 25 November 1987 PFLP-GC hang-glider attack in which six IDF soldiers were killed. In the previous two years there had been about forty Israeli air strikes on Lebanon.

In May 1988, Israel launched an offensive codenamed Operation Law and Order in which 1,500–2,000 Israeli soldiers raided the area around the Lebanese village of Meidoun. In two days of fighting, the IDF killed 50 Hizbullah fighters while losing 3 dead and 17 wounded. On 18 October 1988, eight Israeli soldiers were killed by a Hezbollah suicide car bomb. The Israelis responded with extensive air and land attacks.

After Israel destroyed Hezbollah's headquarters in the town of Marrakeh, a Hezbollah suicide bomber destroyed an Israeli transport truck carrying soldiers on the Israel-Lebanon border. In response, Israeli forces ambushed two Hezbollah vehicles, killing eight Hezbollah fighters.

On 27 July 1989, the Hezbollah leader in South Lebanon, Sheikh Abdel Karim Obeid and two of his aides, were abducted from his home in Jibchit, by IDF commandos. The night-time raid was planned by then Minister of Defence Yitzhak Rabin. Hizbullah responded by announcing the execution of Colonel Higgins, a senior American officer working with UNIFIL, who had been kidnapped in February 1988. The Obeid kidnapping led to the adoption of United Nations Security Council Resolution 638, which condemned all hostage takings by all sides.

=== Taif Agreement (1989–1991) ===
In 1989, the Lebanese Civil War officially came to an end with the Ta'if Accord. Armed combat continued at least until October 1990, and in South Lebanon until at least 1991. The continued Israeli presence in South Lebanon resulted in continued low-intensity warfare and sporadic major combat until the Israeli withdrawal in 2000.

In 1990, Hussein Musawi militant founder and leader of Islamic Amal, a pro-Iran Shia Islamist militia, and also seen as notable founding member of Hezbollah, was killed by an Israeli rocket in an ambush in southern Lebanon.

On 29 March 1991, a car bomb in Antelias district of East Beirut killed 3 people.

On 17 May 1991 two bombs exploded in Nabatieh killing four people including a member of the South Lebanon Army. A statement from the Islamic Jihad Organization claimed responsibility. Five months later the area around Nabatieh was subjected to eight days of shelling by the South Lebanon Army and the Israeli Army. The bombardment culminated on 1 November with a series of IAF airstrikes which destroyed two bridges between Nabatieh and Iqlim al Tuffah. The Israeli offensive coincided with the start of the Madrid Peace Conference.

On 30 December 1991, a car bomb killed 15 bystanders and injured over 100 in West Beirut. The attack took place in the mainly Shia Basta quarter.

=== Outbreak of hostilities after the Lebanese Civil War (1991–1993) ===
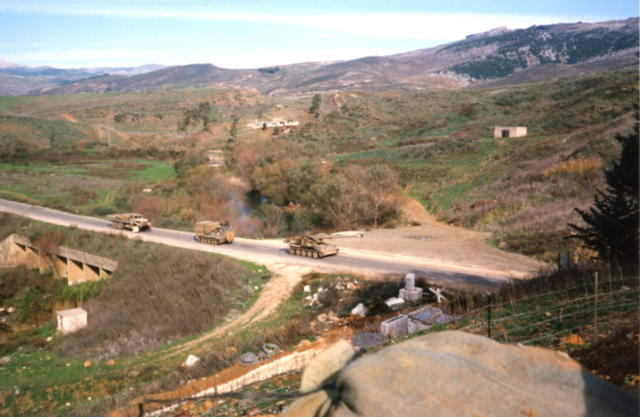
IDF military patrol crossing the Khardala Bridge in south Lebanon, 1988

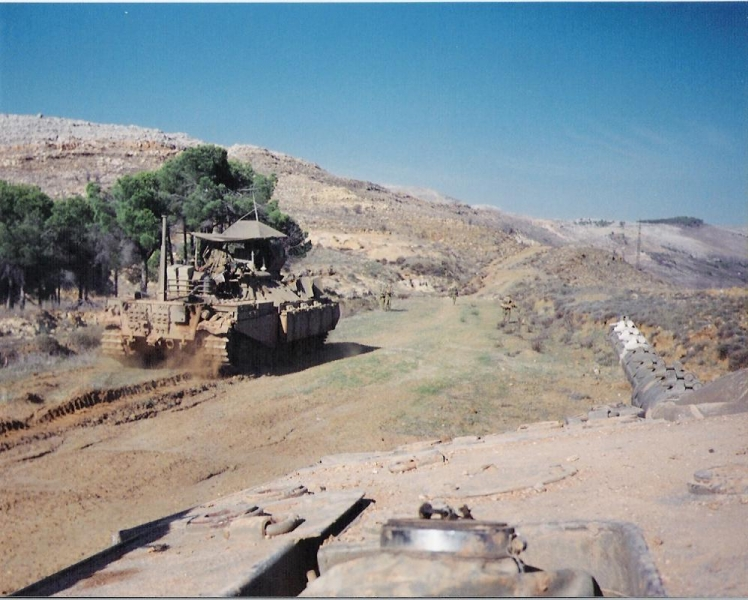
IDF military patrol between Aaichiye to ar-Rihan, 1995

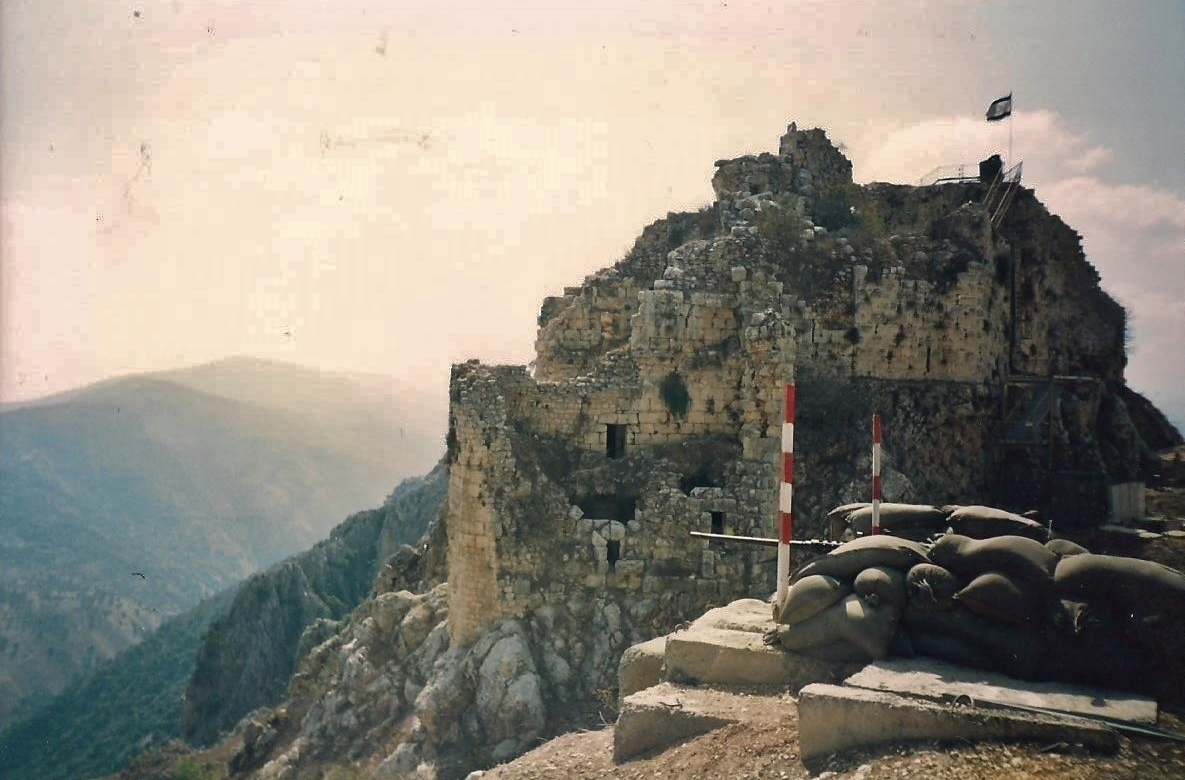
Beaufort IDF northern military post, 1995

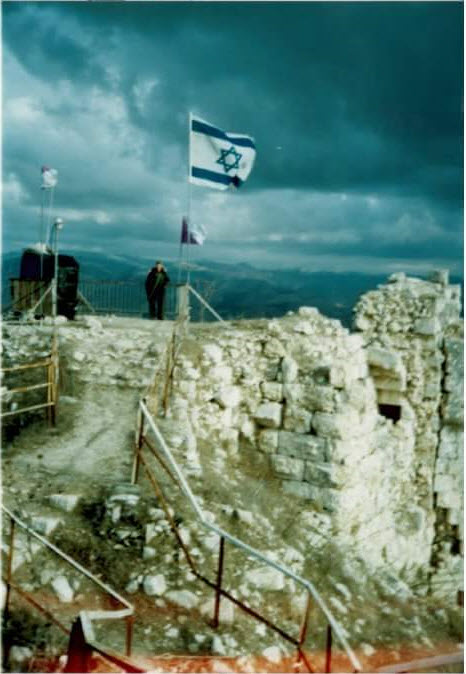
Beaufort IDF northern military post, 1993

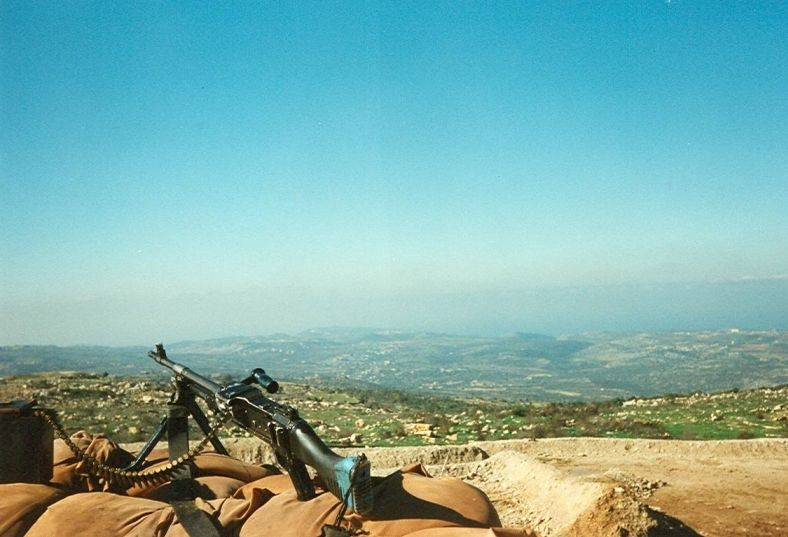
Carcom IDF military post in Lebanon, 1998

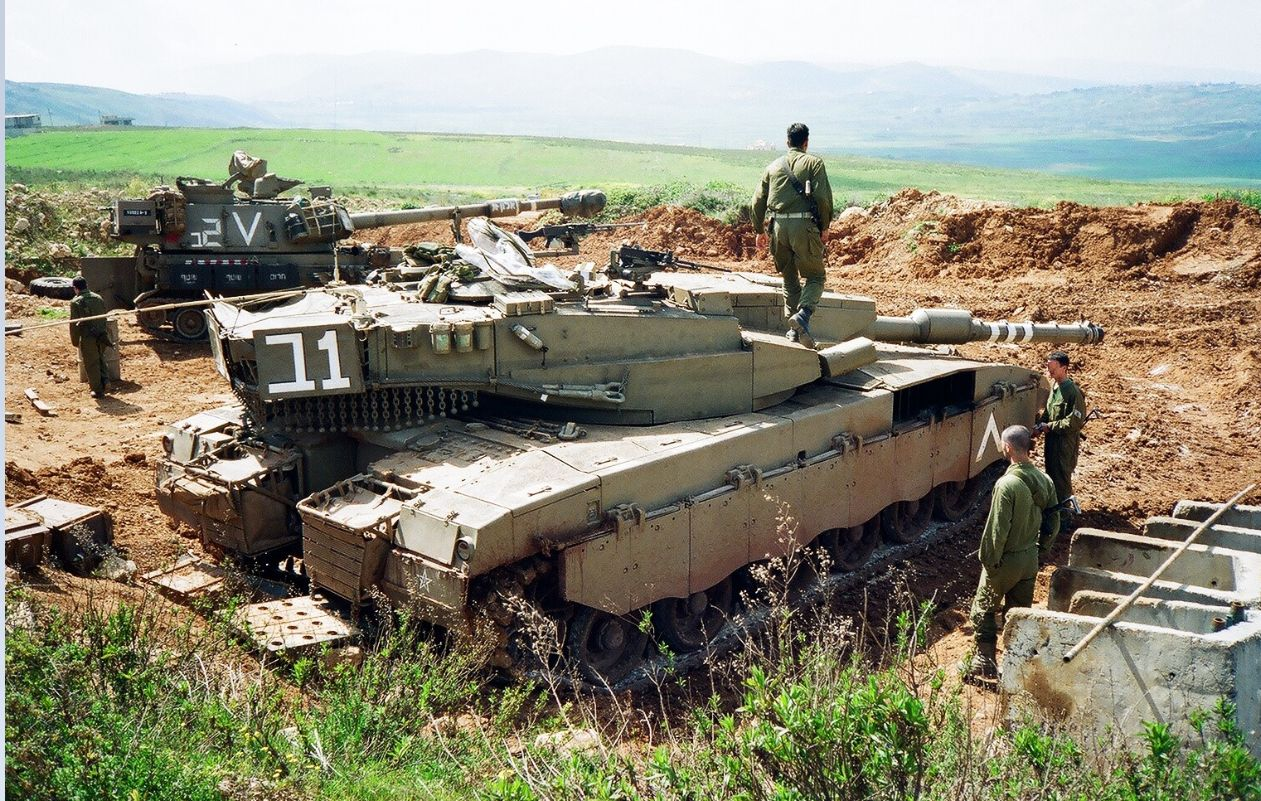
IDF tank near Shreife IDF military post in Lebanon, 1998

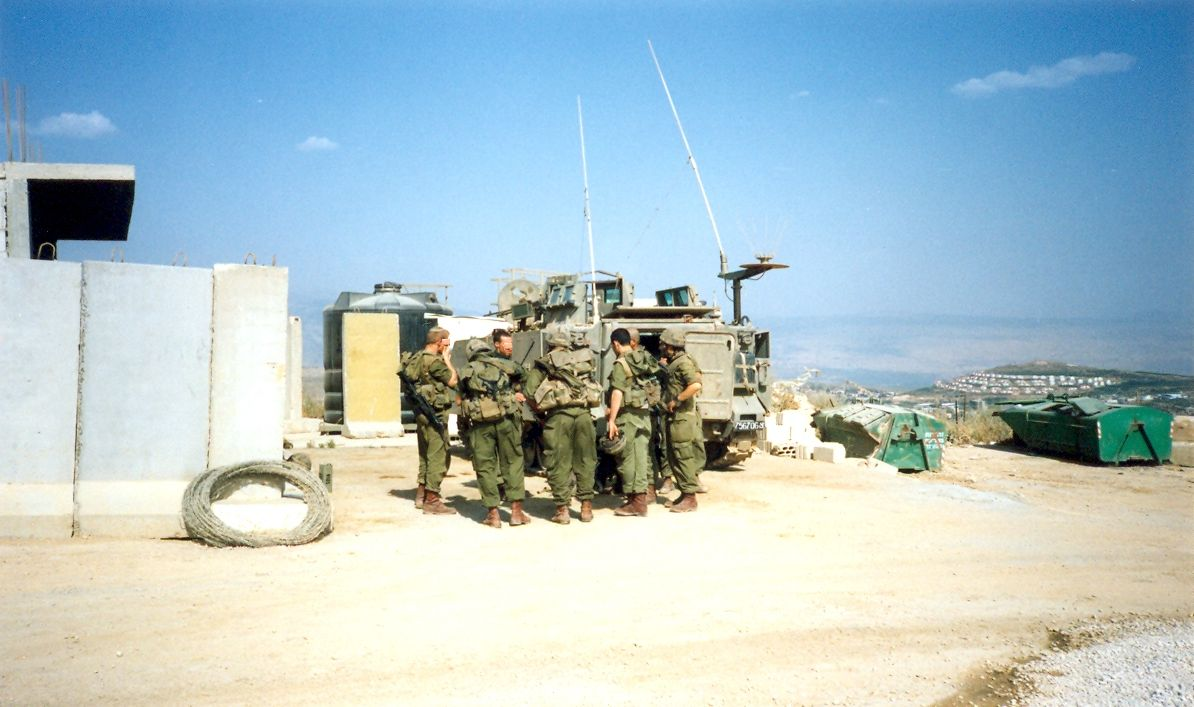
Galagalit IDF military patrol south Lebanon, 1999

Though the majority of the Lebanese civil war conflicts ended in the months following the Ta'if Accord, Israel kept maintaining a military presence in South Lebanon. Consequently, the Islamic Resistance, by now dominated by Hezbollah, continued operations in the South.

Several days of Israeli air raids ended on 4 June 1991. Targets, in the biggest attack since 1982, included buildings belonging to Fateh, PFLP, DFLP and Fateh-Revolutionary Command. Twenty-two people were killed and 82 wounded.

On 4 July 1991, following the failure of disarmament negotiations, as required by the Taif agreement, the Lebanese Army attacked Palestinian positions in Southern Lebanon. The offensive, involving 10,000 troops against an estimated 5,000 militia, lasted 3 days and ended with the Army taking all the Palestinian positions around Sidon. In the agreement that followed, all heavy weapons were surrendered and infantry weapons only allowed in the two refugee camps, Ain al-Hilweh and Mieh Mieh. 73 people were killed in the fighting, and 200 wounded, mostly Palestinian.

Hezbollah's leader Abbas al-Musawi had announced that they would not give up their weapons. "Our guns are a red line that cannot be crossed". On 16 July 1991 they ambushed an Israeli patrol north of the security zone in Kufr Huna. Three Israeli soldiers, including 2 officers, were killed and four wounded. One Hizbollah fighter was killed. The following day the South Lebanon Army destroyed 14 houses, and burnt crops in neighbouring Majd al-Zun.

Prior to their disbandment, militiamen from Amal were active in South Lebanon. On 29 July 1991 they killed three members of the South Lebanon Army (SLA). Israel responded with shelling that killed two villagers. On 23 August 1991, two members of the SLA were killed by members of Amal. The Israeli Army responded the following day with shelling which killed one civilian. Two Irish soldiers serving with UNIFIL were amongst the wounded.

On 15 November 1991, an Irish soldier serving with UNIFIL was killed by the SLA. On 25 November, three Lebanese Army soldiers were killed by an Israeli rocket.

On 16 February 1992, al-Musawi was assassinated, along with his wife, son and four others when Israeli AH-64 Apache helicopter gunships fired three missiles at his motorcade. The Israeli attack came in retaliation for the killings of three Israeli soldiers two days earlier when their camp was infiltrated. Hezbollah responded with rocket fire onto the Israeli security zone. Israel fired back and sent two armored columns past the security zone to hit Hezbollah strongholds in Kafra and Yater.

Musawi was succeeded by Hassan Nasrallah. One of Nasrallah's first public declarations was the "retribution" policy: If Israel hit Lebanese civilian targets, then Hezbollah would retaliate with attacks on Israeli territory. Meanwhile, Hezbollah continued attacks against IDF targets within occupied Lebanese territory. In response to the attack, Ehud Sadan, the chief of security at the Israeli Embassy in Turkey was assassinated by a car bomb. Islamic Jihad (Lebanon) is reported to have claimed that the 1992 Buenos Aires Israeli embassy bombing, in which 29 people were killed, was their response.

Three months after the assassination, the Israeli Air Force launched five air raids on Lebanon in six days. Some of the targets struck were as far north as Baalbek. On the final day, 26 May 1992, there were more than 40 missile strikes. Over 20 civilians were killed during the offensive.

In 1993, hostilities flared again. After a month of Hezbollah shelling on Israeli towns and attacks on military positions, Israel conducted a seven-day operation in July 1993 called Operation Accountability in order to hit Hezbollah. One Israeli soldier and 8–50 Hezbollah fighters were killed in the operation, along with 2 Israeli and 118 Lebanese civilians. After one week of fighting in South Lebanon, a mutual agreement mediated by the United States prohibited attacks on civilian targets by both parts.

The end of Operation Accountability saw a few days of calm before light shelling resumed. On 17 August, a major artillery exchange took place. On 19 August, nine Israeli soldiers were killed in two Hezbollah attacks. Israel responded with airstrikes against Hezbollah positions, killing at least two Hezbollah fighters.

=== Continued fighting in the late 1990s (1994–1999) ===
On 7 February 1994 four Israeli soldiers were killed and three wounded in an ambush in southern Lebanon, which Hezbollah announced was to mark the anniversary of Abbas al-Musawi's death. There were no Hezbollah casualties in the attack.

In May 1994, Israeli commandos kidnapped an Amal leader, Mustafa Dirani. In June, an Israeli airstrike against a training camp killed 30–45 Hezbollah cadets. Hezbollah retaliated by firing four barrages of Katyusha rockets into northern Israel.

On 30 August 1994, a squad of Hezbollah fighters that had infiltrated the security zone ambushed an Israeli patrol, resulting in a firefight in which one Israeli soldier and three Hezbollah fighters were killed.

On 31 March 1995, Rida Yasin, also known as Abu Ali, a senior Hezbollah commander in southern Lebanon, was killed by a single rocket fired from an Israeli helicopter while in a car near Derdghaya in the Israeli security zone, 10 km east of Tyre. An aide who had been riding with him was also killed. An Israeli civilian was killed and fifteen wounded in the retaliatory rocket fire. In May 1995, four Hezbollah fighters were killed in a firefight with Israeli troops while trying to infiltrate an Israeli position.

Operation Grapes of Wrath in 1996 resulted in the deaths of more than 150 Lebanese civilians, most of them in the shelling of a United Nations base at Qana. After seventeen days of bombing a ceasefire was agreed between Israel and Hezbollah, committing to avoid civilian casualties. Combat continued for at least two months. 14 Hezbollah fighters, about a dozen Syrian soldiers, and 3 Israeli soldiers were killed in the fighting.

In 1995, the IDF Egoz Reconnaissance Unit was created as a special forces counter-guerrilla unit in order to counter Hezbollah operations in Southern Lebanon. The unit's first commander was Erez Zuckerman. Zuckerman led the unit in a series of counter-guerrilla operations in South Lebanon that resulted in a high number of Hezbollah operatives killed. In September 1996, Zuckerman commanded a force from the unit in an operation at Sujud ridge. The force encountered and killed three Hezbollah operatives, while its own losses were two dead and several injured. The unit is credited with killing sixteen guerrillas in 1996.

On 14 December 1996, Brig. Gen. Eli Amitai, the IDF commander of the security zone, was lightly injured when an IDF convoy he was travelling in was ambushed in the eastern sector of the security zone. Less than a week later Amitai was again lightly injured when Hezbollah unleashed a mortar barrage on an SLA position near Bra'shit he was visiting, together with Maj. Gen. Amiram Levine, head of the IDF's Northern Command.

In December 1996, two SLA soldiers were killed in three days of fighting, and a Hezbollah fighter was killed by Israeli soldiers.

On 4 February 1997, two Israeli transport helicopters collided over She'ar Yashuv in Northern Israel while waiting for clearance to fly into Lebanon. A total of 73 IDF troops were killed in the disaster. On 28 February, one Israeli personnel and four Hezbollah guerrillas were killed in a clash.

The increased activity of Israeli special forces, particularly the Egoz Reconnaissance Unit, who staked out infiltration trails along the edge of the security zone, hampered Hezbollah's ability to infiltrate the security zone and plant roadside bombs. In the first half of 1997, Hezbollah gradually reduced its infiltration attempts and increasingly resorted to long-range shelling of IDF and SLA outposts. Encouraged by these successes, Israeli commandos began conducting raids north of the security zone to kill Hezbollah members in their home villages.

In one particular raid, carried out on the night of 3–4 August 1997, Golani Brigade soldiers raided the village of Al-Kfour and left behind three roadside bombs packed with ball bearings that were detonated from an Israeli Air Force UAV hours later, killing five Hezbollah members, including two commanders. Faced with roadside bomb attacks and deep-penetration raids by Israeli special forces, Hezbollah was increasingly kept on the defensive and forced to reexamine its tactics.

Following the Kfour commando raid, Hezbollah tightened security in villages north of the security zone to counter Israeli commando raids. Hezbollah units responsible for nighttime observation increased their patrols, staking out potential helicopter landing spots, infiltration passages from the security zone, and landing spots on the shore. Roadside bombs were planted across potential routes for infiltration. Key areas in villages, on hilltops, and in valleys were monitored every night.

On 18 August 1997, following a roadside bomb near Jezzine which killed two teenage members of a SLA leader's family, SLA artillery shelled Sidon killing seven civilians and wounding thirty-five. Hezbollah responded the following day by firing 60–80 rockets into the security zone and northern Israel. According to UNIFIL observers the missiles appeared to be targeted at uninhabited areas. The attack on Sidon is credited with leading to a truce between Hezbollah and Amal and increased cooperation between the two groups and the Lebanese Army. This was evident in the Ansariya ambush the following month.

On 28 August, a major friendly fire incident occurred in Wadi Saluki during a clash between IDF troops from the Golani Brigade, together with air and artillery support, and Amal militants. Although, four Amal militants were killed, Israeli shelling started a fire that engulfed the area, killing four IDF soldiers.

On 5 September 1997, a seaborne raid by 16 Israeli Shayetet 13 naval commandos failed after the troops stumbled into a Hezbollah and Amal ambush. As the force headed towards the coastal town of Ansariye, it was ambushed with IEDs and subjected to withering fire that killed the commander, Lt. Col. Yossi Korakin, and caused bombs being carried by another soldier to explode, killing more of the force. The survivors radioed for help, and Israel immediately dispatched a rescue team from Unit 669 and Sayeret Matkal in two CH-53 helicopters.

A rescue force of helicopters and missile boats arrived to provide support, conducting airstrikes as the rescuers evacuated the dead and survivors. Lebanese Army anti-aircraft units put up anti aircraft fire and fired illumination rounds at the helicopters, and an Israeli F-16 subsequently attacked an anti-aircraft position. Hezbollah put up mortar fire, killing a Druze army doctor with the rescue force and damaging a helicopter. Israeli missile boats fired at the source of the mortar fire. The battle ended when Israel, by means of contacting the US government and delivering a message to be passed on to Syria and from there to Hezbollah, threatened to respond with massive force if Hezbollah tried to stop the rescue mission, causing Hezbollah and Amal to cease fire while the Lebanese Army moved in. Twelve Israelis were killed, while two Hezbollah fighters were wounded. A woman in a passing car was also killed.

In 2010, Hassan Nasrallah claimed that in 1997, Hezbollah had managed to hack into Israeli UAVs flying over Lebanon and thus learn which route the commandos were planning to take and prepared ambushes accordingly. On September 13–14, 1997, IDF raids in Lebanon killed a further four Hezbollah fighters and six Lebanese soldiers.

On 12 September 1997, three Hezbollah fighters were killed in an ambush by Egoz commandos on the edge of the security zone. One of them was Hadi Nasrallah, the son of Hezbollah leader Hassan Nasrallah. On 25 May 1998, the remains of Israeli soldiers killed in the failed commando raid were exchanged for 65 Lebanese prisoners and the bodies of 40 Hezbollah fighters and Lebanese soldiers captured by Israel. Among the bodies returned to Lebanon were the remains of Hadi Nasrallah.

In the autumn of 1997 Hizbollah began using Sager missiles. On 8 October, two IDF soldiers were killed when their tank was hit. There were six other casualties, two of them serious. The attack took place 300 metres from the border with Israel. Ten days later another soldier was killed when his tank was hit. This brought the number of Israeli soldiers killed in 1997 up to thirty nine, twelve more than in 1996. The new tactics resulted in Centurion tanks being withdrawn and the armour of the Merkava being upgraded. At the time it was reported that Hezbollah had five hundred fighters in the field at one time, while the IDF had 1,000 troops in the security zone alongside the SLA's 2,000.

During 1998, 21 Israeli soldiers were killed in southern Lebanon. Israel undertook a concerted campaign to hamper Hezbollah's capabilities, and in December 1998, the Israeli military assassinated Zahi Naim Hadr Ahmed Mahabi, a Hezbollah explosives expert, north of Baalbek.

On 9 February 1999, the first fatal attack on Israeli troops since October 1998 took place when Hezbollah fighters ambushed an IDF unit of the Givati Brigade. One Israeli soldier and at least three Hezbollah fighters were killed and seven Israeli soldiers were wounded in the fighting.

On 23 February 1999, an IDF paratrooper unit on a night time patrol was ambushed in south Lebanon. Major Eitan Balahsan and two lieutenants were killed and another five soldiers were wounded.

On 28 February, a roadside bomb exploded on the road between Kaukaba and Arnoun, in the Israeli-occupied security zone. Brigadier General Erez Gerstein, commander of the Golani Brigade and head of the IDF Liaison Unit in Lebanon, thus the highest ranking Israeli officer serving in Lebanon at the time, as well as two Druze Israeli soldiers and one Israeli journalist were killed in the blast.

In May 1999, Hezbollah forces simultaneously attacked 14 Israeli and SLA outposts in south Lebanon. The outpost in Beit Yahoun compound belonging to the SLA was overrun and one SLA soldier was taken prisoner. The Hizbullah fighters made off with an Armoured Personnel Carrier (APC). The area was bombed by the Israeli Air Force. The captured APC was paraded through the southern suburbs of Beirut.

In June 1999, following five days of Lebanese villages in the South coming under artillery fire, Hezbollah fired a salvo of Katusha rockets into northern Israel, injuring four people. The Israeli response was immediate. On 24–25 June the Israeli Air Force launched two waves of airstrikes lasting several hours. Following the first air raids, Hezbollah fired a second salvo of rockets into the centre of Kiryat Shmona, killing two people. The Israeli bombing caused an estimated $52 million worth of damage. Five bridges on the road south from Beirut were destroyed.

Beirut itself was left in darkness when the power plant at Jamhour was hit. Here three firemen were killed by the bombs. The plant had been repaired after it had been hit in Grapes of Wrath. A telephone company's HQ in Jieh and the Hezbollah al Manar radio station in Baalbek were also demolished. Eight Lebanese were killed and seventy seriously injured, two of whom were in a coma.

In August 1999, Hezbollah commander Ali Hassan Deeb, better known as Abu Hassan, a leader in Hezbollah's special force, was assassinated in an Israeli military operation. Deeb was driving in Sidon when two roadside bombs were detonated by a remote signal from a UAV overhead. Shortly afterwards, a clash broke out between IDF troops and Hezbollah fighters in Wadi Saluki, after Hezbollah fighters on their way to plant bombs were intercepted by a squad from the IDF's Golani Brigade. Two IDF soldiers and three Hezbollah fighters were killed in the fighting. Hezbollah announced that the incident was revenge for the assassination of Deeb.

Overall, in the course of 1999, several dozen Hezbollah and Amal fighters were killed. Twelve Israeli soldiers and one civilian were also killed, one of them in accident.

== 2000 Israeli withdrawal and collapse of South Lebanon Army ==
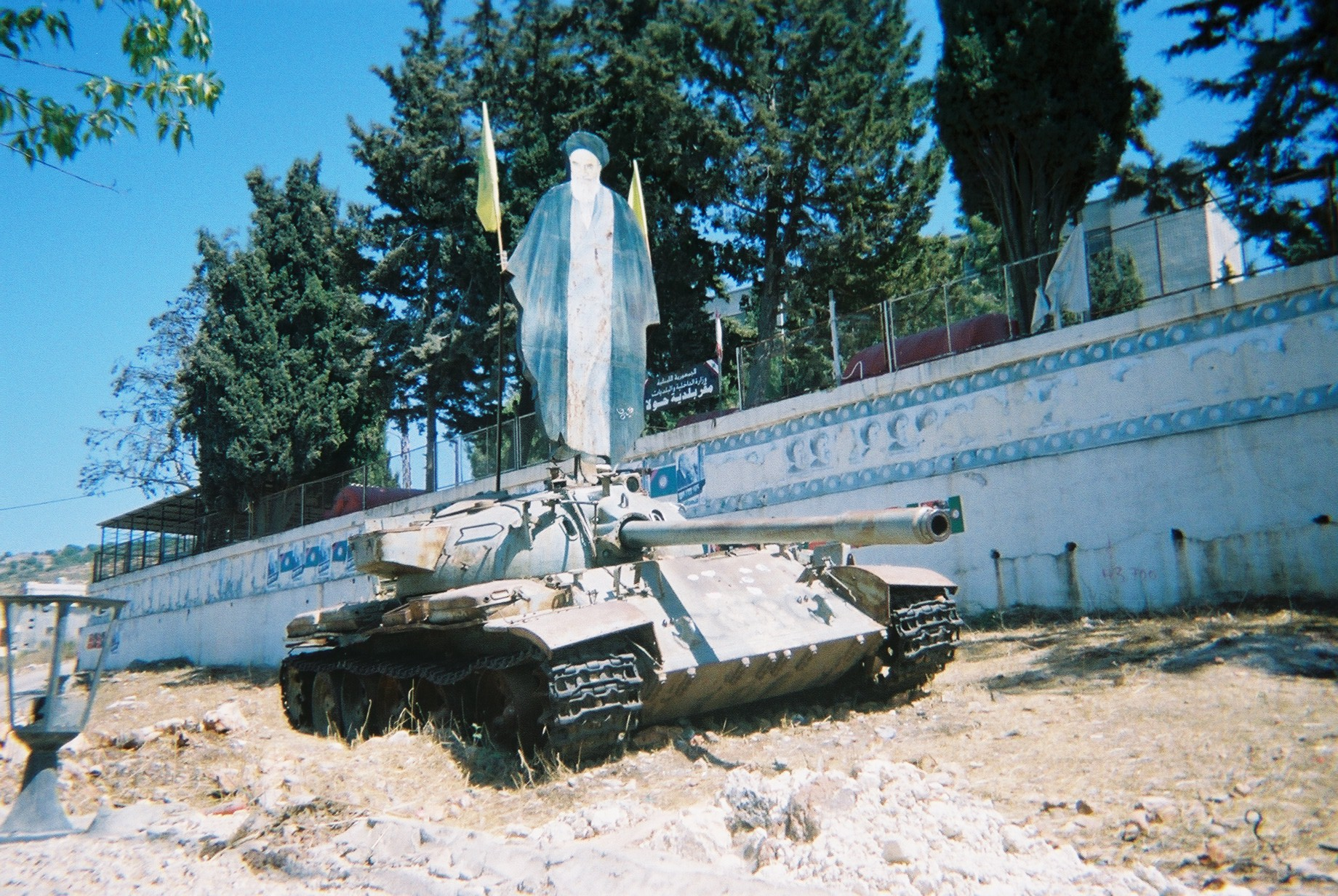
A captured SLA tank, featuring a wooden portrait of the late Ayatollah Khomeini in the village of Hula

In July 1999, Ehud Barak became Israel's Prime Minister, promising Israel would unilaterally withdraw to the international border by July 2000. Prior to his actions, many believed that Israel would only withdraw from South Lebanon upon reaching an agreement with Syria.

On 30 January 2000, Hezbollah assassinated the commander of the South Lebanon Army's Western Brigade, Colonel Aql Hashem, at his home in the security zone. Hashem had been responsible for day-to-day operations of the SLA and was a leading candidate to succeed General Antoine Lahad. After this assassination there were doubts about the leadership of the South Lebanon Army (SLA). The pursuit and assassination of Hashim was documented step by step and the footage was broadcast on Hezbollah TV channel al-Manar. The operation and the way it was presented in media dealt a devastating blow to the morale in the SLA.

On 4 February 2000, Israel attempted to kill prominent Hezbollah member Ibrahim Aqil. Israeli AH-64 Apache helicopters fired AGM-114 Hellfire missiles at Aqil's car in the village of Barish, where he was serving as Hezbollah's commander of the South Lebanon sector (or the western sector in South Lebanon). The first missile struck the rear of the car and threw him out. He escaped and hid behind a building. The second missile destroyed the car. After being spotted hiding, another missile was fired at him and hit the wall. Aqil was lightly injured and managed to escape the incident. Five civilians, including an infant, were also injured.

During the spring of 2000, Hezbollah operations stepped up considerably, with persistent harassment of Israeli military outposts in occupied Lebanese territory. As preparation for the major withdrawal plan, Israeli forces began abandoning several forward positions within the security zone of South Lebanon. On 24 May, Israel announced that it would withdraw all troops from South Lebanon. All Israeli forces had withdrawn from Lebanon by the end of the next day, more than six weeks before its stated deadline of 7 July.

The Israeli pullout resulted in the collapse of the SLA and the rapid advance of Hezbollah forces into the area. As the Israeli Defense Forces (IDF) withdrew, thousands of Shi'a Lebanese rushed back to the South to reclaim their properties. This withdrawal was widely considered a victory for Hezbollah and boosted its popularity in Lebanon. The completeness of the withdrawal is still disputed as Lebanon continues to claim the Israeli-occupied Shebaa Farms, a small piece of territory on the Lebanon-Israel-Syria border, with disputed sovereignty.

As a Syrian-backed Lebanese government refused to demarcate its border with Israel, Israel worked with UN cartographers led by regional coordinator Terje Rød-Larsen to certify Israel had withdrawn from all occupied Lebanese territory. On 16 June 2000, UN Security Council concluded that Israel had indeed withdrawn its forces from all of Lebanon, in accordance with United Nations Security Council Resolution 425 (1978).

Israel considered this move as tactical withdrawal since it always regarded the Security Zone as a buffer zone to defend Israel's citizens. By ending the occupation, Barak's cabinet assumed it would improve its worldwide image. Ehud Barak has argued that "Hezbollah would have enjoyed international legitimacy in their struggle against a foreign occupier", if the Israelis had not unilaterally withdrawn without a peace agreement.

== Aftermath ==
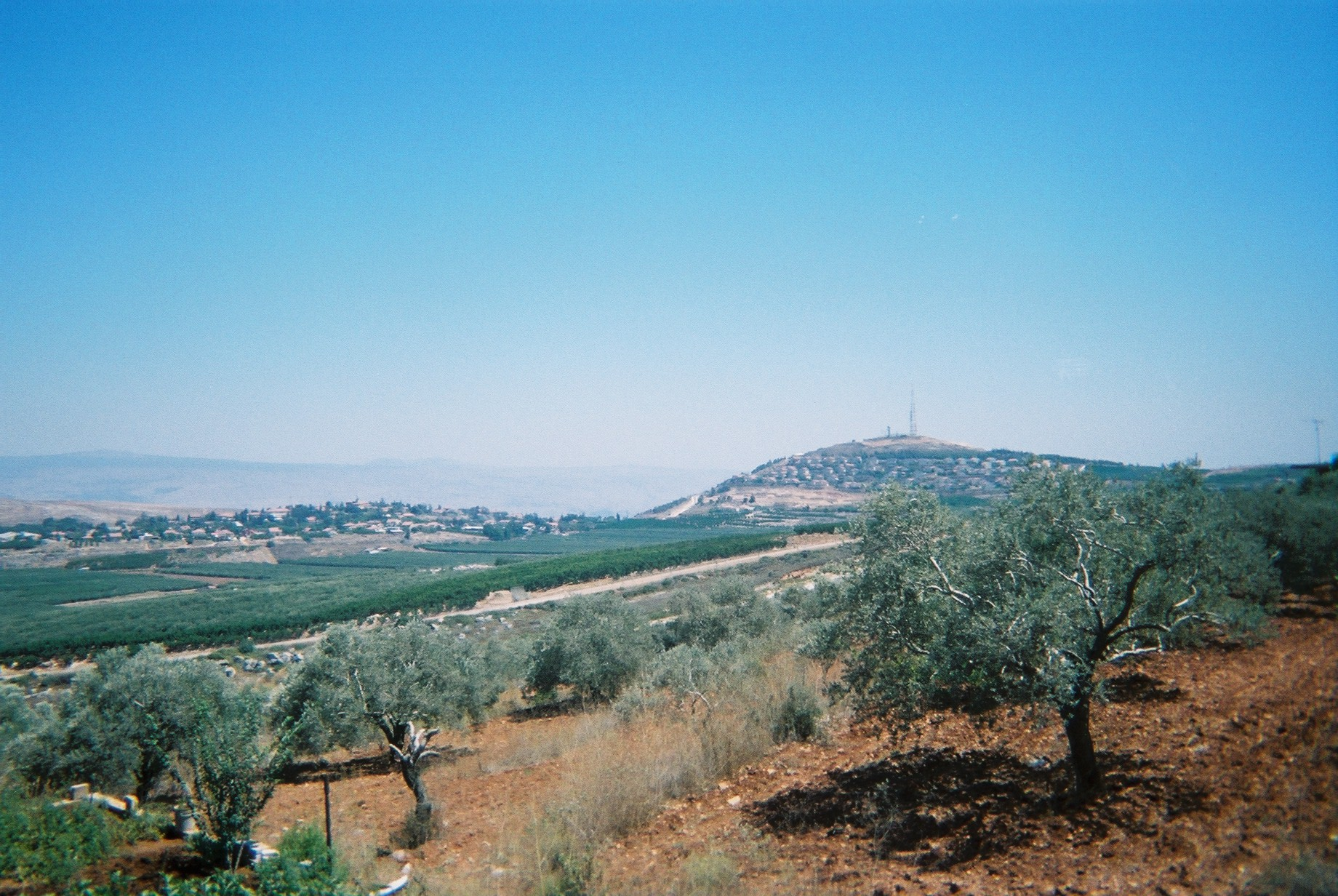
An Israeli Army outpost, in 2007, as seen from the Lebanese side of the border

Upon Israel's withdrawal, an increasing fear that Hezbollah would seek vengeance against those thought to have supported Israel became widespread among the Christian Lebanese of the Southern Lebanon. During and after the withdrawal around 10,000 Lebanese, mostly Maronites, fled into Galilee. Hezbollah later met with Lebanese Christian clerics to reassure them that the Israeli withdrawal was a victory for Lebanon as a nation, not just one sect or militia.

The tentative peace, resulting from the withdrawal, did not last. On 7 October 2000 Hezbollah attacked Israel. In a cross-border raid, three Israeli soldiers, who were patrolling the Lebanese border were attacked and abducted. The event escalated into a 2-month fire exchanges between Israel and Hezbollah, primarily at the Hermon ridge. The bodies of the abducted soldiers were returned to Israel in a January 2004 prisoner exchange involving 450 Lebanese prisoners held in Israeli jails. The long-time Lebanese prisoner Samir al-Quntar was excluded from the deal.

The government of Israel agreed to a "further arrangement", whereby Israel would release Samir al-Quntar if it was supplied with "tangible information on the fate of captive navigator Ron Arad". According to Harel and Issacharoff the second phase of the prisoner exchange deal was only a "legal gimmick". Israel was not satisfied with the information supplied by Hezbollah and refused to release al-Quntar. "Cynics may well ask whether it was worth getting entangled in the Second Lebanon War just to keep Kuntar […] in prison for an extra few years."

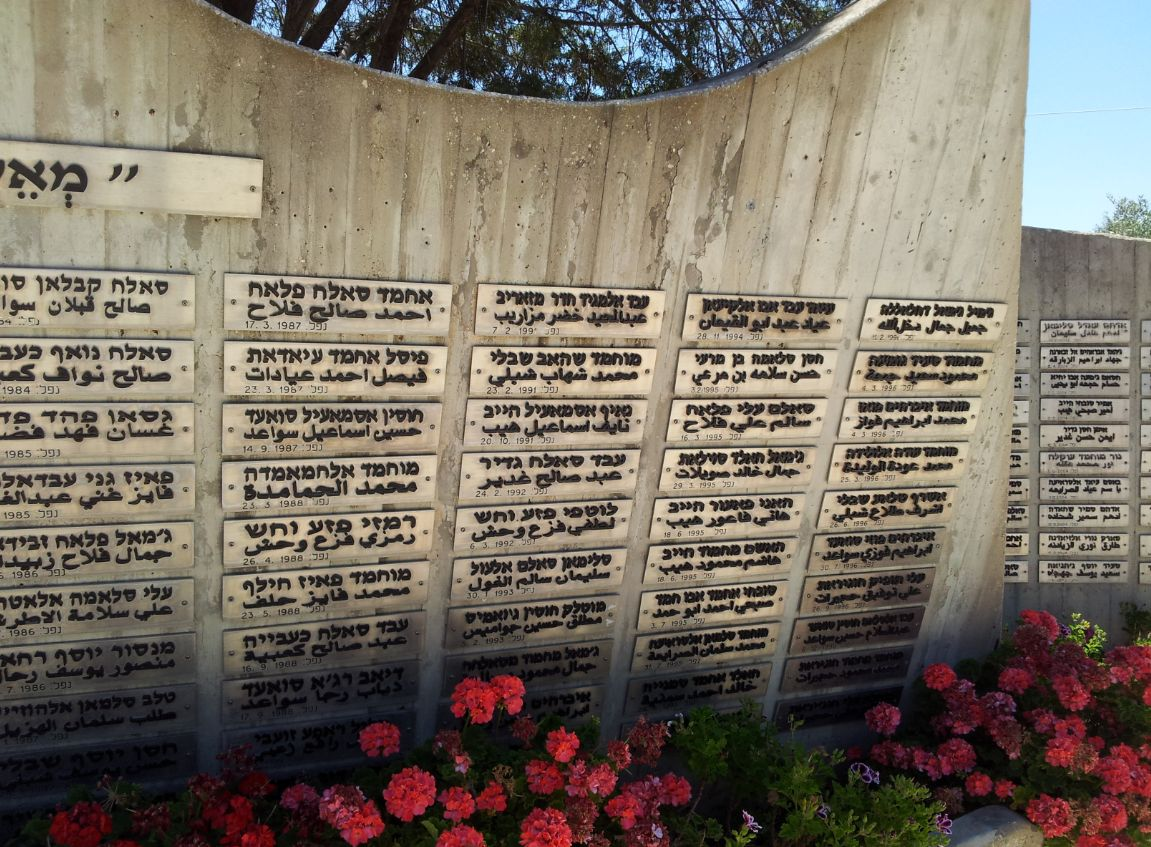
IDF Bedouin memorial wall.

In July 2006, Hezbollah performed a cross-border raid while shelling Israeli towns and villages. During the raid Hezbollah kidnapped two Israeli soldiers and killed eight others. In retaliation, Israel began the 2006 Lebanon War to rescue the abducted soldiers and to create a bufferzone in Southern Lebanon.

== See also ==
- Israeli occupation of Southern Lebanon
- Syrian occupation of Lebanon
- 2008 Lebanon conflict
- List of extrajudicial killings and political violence in Lebanon

General:

- List of modern conflicts in the Middle East

== Bibliography ==
Blanford, Nicholas, Warriors of God, Inside Hezbollah’s Thirty-Year Struggle Against Israel, New York, 2011
