= Iron Fist policy =

1985 Israeli military operation

Operation Iron Fist
Date	1985
Location	Southern Lebanon; West Bank; Gaza Strip
Result	Israeli victory

Belligerents
Israel	Amal (and others) al-Qiyada al-Muwhhada

The Iron Fist policy, also known as Operation Iron Fist, was a policy involving series of raids carried out in 1985 by the Israeli Defence Force during the 1985–2000 South Lebanon conflict and First Intifada against Palestinian and Lebanese targets. The policy takes its name from a 1983 statement by Israeli Prime Minister Yitzhaq Shamir that "Middle East peoples should realize that if Israel is provoked, the hand extended in peace will turn into an iron fist that will strike at terrorism to the bitter end."

In The Struggle Over Lebanon, journalist Tabitha Petran described the policy as an "important factor in Israel's defeat in the south and eventual withdrawal".

== Background ==
Following Israel's 1982 invasion of Southern Lebanon the Israelis remained in occupation of Southern Lebanon. The Israel troops occupying Southern Lebanon became the target of various armed groups in Southern Lebanon that opposed their occupation. In retaliation for attacks on Israelis, the Israeli military launched retaliatory raids against those they believed responsible for these attacks whilst simultanoeously withdrawing to lines closer to the Israeli-Lebanese border. The intent of the policy was to crush resistance to Israel's continued occupation in Southern Lebanon.

== History ==
=== South Lebanon ===
The Israeli crackdown began after three Israeli soldiers were killed in ambushes in three days after the Israeli withdrawal from the Sidon area on 16 February. It begane with a raid on Bourj Rahel, which was subsequently raided another 26 times by 23 March 1985. Raids conducted as a result of the policy included dozens of raids on Shi'a villages, dawn-to-dusk curfews, and ban on travel in certain areas. 15 Lebanese were killed and 22 wounded in the first week of the policy. During the raids local villagers alleged that the Israelis removed grain stores as well as mixing grain to be unusable, and tore up the Koran.

On 4 March, a bomb that, according to Robert Fisk, had been planted by the IDF in a Maarakeh mosque exploded, leaving 15 people dead, including Mohammed Saad and Khalil Jradi. The IDF has raided the village two days earlier, with a force of some 800 Israelis in a column comprising two bulldozers, three tanks, 50 APCs, and 30 vehicles of other types, and searched that mosque. On 11 March 1985 a major raid on the Shiite village of Zrarieh was carried out in which as many as 40 people were killed, including members of Amal. On 12 March, the United States vetoed a United Nations Security Council resolution condemning Israel operations. By 23 March 1985, more than 100 Lebanese had been killed, including a 2-man CBS film crew, and 40 houses destroyed.

=== Extension to the West Bank ===
On 4 August 1985 the national unity cabinet declared an "Iron Fist" policy of crackdowns against Palestinian opposition in the occupied West Bank. By the end of 1985 125 Palestinians had been detained under six-month administrative detention orders. The policy was prompted by the killing of eight Israeli civilians in attacks in the two months to 29 July 1985. Deportation of West Bank and Gaza Strip Arabs to Jordan and Lebanon was among the policies considered. Ultimately 36 Palestinians were deported between August 1985 and April 1986 under the policy.

== See also ==
- Zrarieh raid
- Break-their-bones policy
