= Zrarieh raid =

1985 Israeli attack on Lebanese village

Date	11 March 1985
Location	Zrariyeh, Southern Lebanon 33°34′21″N 35°33′27″E
Result	Israeli victory

Belligerents
Israel	Amal movement

Casualties and losses
- 21–40 Lebanese residents killed

The Zrarieh raid was an Israeli raid on the Lebanese village of Zrarieh in Southern Lebanon on 11 March 1985. During the raid between 21 and 40 residents were killed.

According to the Israeli Chief of Staff overseeing operations in South Lebanon at the time, Moshe Levi, the operation was preemptive rather than punitive, and had been in planning for a week, on the basis of intelligence that attacks were being organized against Israeli forces in the area. Excluding the victims of air raids, it constituted the deadliest Israeli action in Lebanon in 30 months, since the summer of 1982.

== Background ==
The Zrarieh raid took place in the context of operations conducted under the banner of Shimon Peres's Iron Fist policy, announced on 21 February 1985, which aimed to crush growing Shiite resistance to the Israeli occupation. It became immediately operative the next day, with heavy military sweeps through Tayr Debba, Deir Qanoun En Nahr, Arabsalim and several other villages nearby. On that occasion, the IDF crossed their new line on the Zahrani River and raided Zrarieh as well, where they encountered no resistance from the Lebanese Army unit posted there, a passivity which was officially protested by Amal. One resident was shot, and four houses demolished.

An earlier Israeli withdrawal from the village, which took place on 16 February, had been followed up by the arrival of armed Lebanese groups who took up residence there. At the time of the incursion, the area concerned, near Nabatieh, lay under the control of both the Lebanese army and various Shiite militias, having been evacuated by the Israeli army during its withdrawal from its occupation of Lebanon, north of the buffer zone it had established further south. Zrarieh lay 2 miles north of the buffer zone. Over the preceding two weeks, the Israeli army had engaged in three other clashes with the Lebanese army.

On 5 March, a car packed with explosives demolished a Southern Lebanese Shiite mosque in Maarakeh, 8 miles east of Tyre, one day after Israeli troops had withdrawn from a search operation in the village. 12-15 victims died as a result, among them 2 Amal representatives, Mohammed Saad and Khalil Jaradi. Lebanese blamed the incident on Israel.

On 8 March a car bombing in a Shia suburb of Beirut, initially attributed to Israel, led to the death of 80 people.

On 11 March, a suicide-bomber attack on an Israeli convoy took place. In that incident, 12 Israeli soldiers were killed a mile north of Metula, 15 miles east of Zrarieh, as their convoy, driving north to Marjayoun, was hit by a bomb packed into a Chevrolet pickup truck as they crossed a bridge over the Nahr Bareighit stream in South Lebanon. 14 others were wounded.

== Raid ==
Israel had been conducting punitive raids on Shia villages in the south on a daily basis for some three weeks before the assault on Zrarieh, which was to prove the most fearsome. Prior to the incursion, the largest number killed by Israeli forces in the area were 11 men suspected of infiltrating a zone near the Awali river. The village, located 2 miles north of the Litani river, had 10,000 residents.

Having alerted the Lebanese army of its operational intentions while asking them not interfere, the IDF began to lay down a heavy artillery barrage on Zrarieh and three other nearby villages at 11 pm. The Lebanese army which maintained a unit of two dozen soldiers in Zrarieh at the time, all of them Shiites and were expected by the IDF to put up resistance out of solidarity with the villagers, responded to the cannon-fire, and then withdrew, suffering one dead, and another wounded. According to the military head of Amal, Akel Hamrye, the attack was launched simultaneously from three directions as troops moved in from positions to the north, south and west of the village. At the same time, a single tank was positioned only the only exit road remaining and fired on vehicles driving out of Zrarieh.

The Israeli raid within the village, with a force of over 40 armoured personnel carriers, as well as heavy tanks, lasted 10 hours, Red Cross workers and correspondents were fired on by a tank, warning them to stay away., and two of their vehicles were warned by radio to avoid entering the village. It also stated that the IDF force had blown up 11 houses where arms had been found, though other sources fix the number of homes demolished at roughly 20; destroyed the police station and had used tanks to drive over and flatten local cars. The local men were rounded up and made to stand in the square in the heat until taken away in two buses. When reporters managed to enter the village on Monday afternoon, one of them, Associated Press correspondent Samir Gattas, counted 12 bullet-riddled bodies lying beside cars on the road into Zrarieh Every car in the township had been either machine-gunned or smashed, and all the iron shutters of garages and shop fronts had been torn down. In one car crushed by an Israeli tank, a reporter for the Associated Press observed, a dead man was visible. The day after as-Safir printed a photo showing three smashed cars their drivers' bodies inside. Visiting reporters also noted 5-6 bodies on roads near the site, 4 of whom were elderly passengers in civilian cars raked by machine gun and tank fire, apparently killed while trying to flee. The IDF described the incident as a gun fight between its forces and heavily armed guerillas, but withdrew without suffering casualties. According to a statement by the Arab League, an Israeli officer threatened locals, stating that they would raze the town if TV crews were given permission later to enter the town and film the damage.

Large caches of arms were discovered in a number of locales. The IDF described the 34 killed as 'suspected Shiite Moslem guerillas.' Referring to the numerous smashed cars, an IDF spokesman stated that they were all loaded with arms and explosives.

In addition to the 34 Lebanese dead, 17 of whom a senior Amal official said belonged to the organization's militia -one villager stated that they shot at anything that moved,- the IDF stated that it had detained 100-150 young men, effectively the village's entire male population. Of these, 20 were regulars of the Lebanese army. Most of those arrested were released after interrogation, except for 10 who were kept in detention. Israel claimed it had killed one militant whom they believed was responsible for the death of an Israeli lieutenant-colonel in an incident two months earlier. According to local accounts, which refer to the incursion as 'slaughter of Zrarieh', the economic infrastructure of the village was systematically destroyed during the raid.

Thomas Friedman, writing 11 days after the event, set the figure of those killed at Zrarieh at 35, stating that according to the IDF, the 35 killed formed part of a Shiite militia preparing to attack Israeli forces. According to the IDF, the village served as the headquarters of Hezbollah. One IDF spokesman described the village as a " hornets' nest" of Shia resistance.

On the day following the assault, the Lebanese Red Cross managed to visit the village, where they retrieved 21 bodies, all residents of the township, and evacuated a further 22 casualties who had been wounded. Another 12 bodies were found dropped into the Litani river valley.

== Aftermath ==
Writing for the Financial Times, David Lennon and Nora Boustany concluded that, "the death toll was clearly intended to tell the Shia that Israel will respond massively to any casualties it suffers."

The incident at Nahr Bareighit itself, believed to have been a Lebanese retaliation for the two separate incidents at Snubarah Square in Beirut's Bi'r al-'Abd suburb and Maarakeh, might have, according to Wallace, sparked the Israeli retaliation at Zrarieh the following day.

After the Israeli withdrawal, Charles Wallace, a reporter for the Los Angeles Times, visited Zrarieh and noted that on a wall a sprayed message in Arabic was visible, apparently written by the Israelis, which ran: "The Revenge of the Israel Defense Forces", and in addition the name Amal featuring on walls had been blacked out. Wallace speculated that the Israeli raid may have been in response to the car-bombing ambush at Metula. The Israeli army denied its action at Zrarieh was in retaliation for that incident, though the Israeli Minister for Communications Prof. Amnon Rubinstein, did state that news of Zrarieh provided an "emotional release". Le Monde considered the episode a 'bloody reprisal' (revanche sanglante ) for the Metula bombing, as did the historian/journalist Robert Fisk in his history of Lebanon at war, Pity the Nation.

Shortly after the Zrarieh raid, Israel attacked the village of Al-Azariya, 1 kilometer west of the IDF border zone, and claimed it had killed 24 'terrorists', a label, according to Thomas Friedman, which the IDF customarily used of any Lebanese actively involved in opposing the Israeli occupation of that country. In this case, as well, the IDF stated that the event was not a retaliation for the car bombing of its troops. In a larger sweep some ten days later, conducted through several other Shiite villages, including Houmin el Tahta, Srifa, Kfar Melki and Jbaa, a further 23 Lebanese were killed, including two cameramen working for CBS who were filming events in Kfarmelki. The IDF spokesmen stated that the two, and a third member of the crew who was critically injured, were hit by a tank shell as they stood in the midst of men bearing arms. On 4 April, Israeli forces, in a similar 'raking' operation, attacked the village of Kawthariyet el Siyyad and killed another 8 men whom it stated were armed and endeavouring to flee. The inhabitants showed visiting reporters numerous houses that had been ransacked, rifled of their televisions and other goods, and complained of the theft of life savings by the Israeli soldiers conducting the incursion.

In the Knesset, resisting calls to speed up the withdrawal from Lebanon, Yitzhak Rabin stated that Israel intended dealing with "the stockpile of suicidal Shia maniacs" there.

== See also ==
- Maarakeh bombing
