= Ansariya ambush =

1997 ambush in Lebanon

- Part of the South Lebanon conflict (1985–2000)
Date	4–5 September 1997
Location	Ansariya, South Lebanon
Result	Hezbollah victory

Belligerents
Israel Defence Forces	Hezbollah; Supported by: Amal Movement

Commanders and leaders
(Israel) Lt. Col. Yosef Korakin †	Com. Abu Shamran; Ahmed Wehbe

Strength
16 commandos from Naval Special Operations unit, Shayetet 13	20 fighters from local Hezbollah militia and back-up units from Amal militia and Lebanese army

Casualties and losses
12 IDF soldiers killed	2 fighters lightly wounded
- A Lebanese woman and a young girl killed

The Ansariya ambush took place during the conflict between the Israel Defense Forces occupying South Lebanon and the Islamic Resistance in Lebanon, the armed wing of the Hezbollah movement. A 16-man force from the Israeli Navy’s special operation unit, Shayetet 13, on a mission in South Lebanon in 1997, stumbled into a deadly ambush by Hezbollah. Twelve Israeli soldiers were killed, which was the worst Israeli single-day casualty toll in Lebanon since 1985.

== Background ==
On the night of August 3, 1997 an Israeli unit from the Golani Brigade's Reconnaissance Battalion was brought by helicopter to a valley a few kilometres northwest of Nabatiya, outside the Israeli Security Zone in South Lebanon. The force made it to the village of Kfour and planted explosives in a wall outside the home of Hussein Qassir, a local Islamic Resistance commander. The Israelis were detected during the retreat and a firefight broke out, but they were successfully evacuated by helicopter. In the morning Islamic Resistance patrols searched the village for road-side bombs left by the Israelis. When a group of Lebanese fighters passed by the wall, the explosives were detonated by a signal from an Israeli UAV drone. Hussein Qassir and Sheikh Taysir Badran, the Islamic Resistance commander in the nearby town of Nabatiya, and three other Hezbollah combatants were killed.

== The ambush ==
About a month after the Kfour attack the Islamic Resistance received indications that Israel was planning a similar attack around Ansariya, a Lebanese coastal village located between Tyre and Sidon. It was therefore decided to attempt to ambush the Israeli force that was going to plant the explosive device.

The operation was planned by Hezbollah commander Mustafa Badreddine, who would later replace Imad Mughniyah as top military commander of the Islamic Resistance.

The precise target of the Israeli operation was never clarified. Ronen Bergman claims that the target was Haldoun Haidar, a local Hezbollah commander, who was described by responsible officers at the IDF Northern Command as "minor and insignificant". The Hezbollah, however, understood both where the Israelis would land and the approximate route they would then take. The Israelis would arrive from the sea and walk a few kilometres through citrus plantations towards the target. The Hezbollah decided to plant explosives on the likely route, to hit the Israelis before they could reach their target. They had, however, no indication of when Israel would strike, which was a problem because during the daytime the citrus groves were tended to by the local farmers. This meant that the area could not be mined during hours of daylight for fear of harming the farmers. The explosives therefore had to be placed each evening after sunset and removed each morning before daybreak.

Another problem was that the area around Ansariya was a weak spot for Hezbollah and dominated by AMAL, a rival, but by then allied, Shiite movement. It was therefore deemed necessary to contact the local AMAL leadership and warn them about the impending operation. AMAL accepted and even offered to provide a back-up unit for the operation.

The Hezbollah ambush unit consisted of 20 fighters from the local militia, led by the local commander Abu Shamran. According to later Israeli sources, several similar ambushes were organized at different locations.

In the evening of 4 September 1997, a force of 16 commandos from the Israeli Navy’s special operations unit Shayetet 13 walked ashore on an uninhabited stretch of the south Lebanese coastline. It was commanded by Lt. Col. Yosef Korakin. The unit crossed the coastal road and walked through the plantations, shadowed by Israeli drones overhead, which were relaying the images to the IDF command. The unit reached an orchard, covered by a wall. The forward unit successfully managed to break through an iron gate. When the main force passed the gate, a remote-controlled mine exploded. Fourteen seconds later, when the forward unit returned to the site of the explosion, a second mine exploded, killing the Israeli commander. The mines were Claymore type anti-personal explosives, which sprayed metal marbles. Hezbollah fighters then opened fire on the Israelis, triggering the explosives carried by one of the soldiers. In less than four minutes, eleven of the Israelis, including the commander, were dead and four of them were wounded. Only the radioman escaped unhurt and he radioed for support and evacuation.

Israeli Cobra helicopters quickly opened fire with TOW antitank missiles and 20 mm Chain guns, creating a perimeter of fire for the rescue helicopters. Reinforcements in the form of Sayeret Matkal commandos and the Israeli Air Force's Unit 669 rescue unit were landed by two CH-53 helicopters. The Sayeret Matkal commandos formed a defensive perimeter while the Unit 669 team evacuated the dead and wounded IDF soldiers. After two Hezbollah fighters were lightly wounded, it was decided to pull back. The AMAL fighters continued to fire on the Israelis with rifles and rocket-propelled grenades, before pulling back themselves. The Hezbollah fighters continued however to fire mortar shells on the Israelis. Captain Dagesh Maher, a Druze military doctor from the rescue team was mortally wounded by shrapnel from a mortar shell. A civilian Lebanese couple, that happened to pass by in car, were sprayed with bullets by the Israeli soldiers. The woman died and the man was severely wounded. A young girl was also killed in the crossfire. Lebanese army antiaircraft guns fired into the sky, hoping to hit the helicopters and jets overhead, and fired illumination rounds to light up the battlefield. An Israeli fighter jet fired at a Lebanese antiaircraft position and Israeli missile boats offshore fired several rounds into the village to silence the mortar fire, damaging several houses.

More than four hours after the fighting began, the last Israeli helicopter took off with its cargo of wounded and dead soldiers. Despite frantic searches, one of the soldiers remained missing. It was Itamar Ilya, who was blown literally to pieces when the explosives he was carrying were detonated.

== Aftermath ==
The successful ambush at Ansariya was of course received with satisfaction by the Islamic Resistance in Lebanon. But it was considered a catastrophe in Israel and it created a lot of unease in army circles. A total of five officers and seven other soldiers were killed in the clash. It was the worst single-day casualty toll in Lebanon since the Israeli withdrawal to the security zone in 1985. Shayetet 13 had for a long time avoided serious casualties. It would take the unit two years to recuperate from this blow. Prime Minister Netanyahu called it "one of the worst tragedies that has ever occurred to us".

On May 25, 1998, the remains of Itamar Ilyah as well as body parts of at least two other soldiers who died in the Ansariya ambush were exchanged for 65 Lebanese prisoners and the bodies of 40 Hizbullah fighters and Lebanese soldiers captured by Israel. Among those returned to Lebanon, were the remains of Hadi Nasrallah, the son of Hezbollah Secretary-General Hassan Nasrallah, who was killed in a clash with IDF a week after the Ansariya ambush.

== Possible security leak ==
There was a widespread feeling in Israel that the Ansariya operation had been compromised. But the head of the Israeli Military Intelligence Directorate (AMAN) Moshe Ya'alon decided early on that the initial explosion must have come from the explosives carried by one of the Israeli soldiers. It would thus not appear as a planned ambush, but rather as a stroke of bad luck for Israel. Hezbollah thus appeared to have no prior knowledge of the operation and therefore no security leak in Israel was to be suspected.

A commission of Inquiry was appointed. It determined that most of the Israeli casualties were harmed by a different type of explosive, containing metal marbles (which the IDF explosives did not). The commission, however, ruled out the possibility of a security leak in Israel. The ambush was unplanned and not based on intelligence that Hezbollah had obtained. This conclusion was also confirmed by two other subsequent investigations.

On the first anniversary of the ambush, Hezbollah Secretary-General Hassan Nasrallah declared: “All I can say now is that we knew beforehand that there was going to be an operation” he said. “Now the question is: If the resistance knew, who told them? But we can’t disclose that, because that won’t be in the resistance’s best interest.”

At first the focus was about a possible double agent, giving away the Israeli plans to Hezbollah. This version was voiced by The Independent's Beirut correspondent Robert Fisk. An Israeli agent was turned, who disclosed Israeli plans and fed Israel false information. Bergman also claims that double agents in the SLA intelligence outfit played a role in the affair.

In August 2010 Nasrallah revealed that Hezbollah had long been able to download the videos taken by Israeli drones overflying Lebanon. In August 1997 Hezbollah operatives had noticed an apparent Israeli interest in the area around Ansariya and concluded that they were planning a Kfour-type operation in the area. Israeli drones returned several times to the area and seemed to be following a path from the beach, through the plantations to a place north of Ansariya.

These revelations caused to an uproar in Israel. The IDF Chief of Staff Gabi Ashkenazi appointed a fourth commission of inquiry, headed by Col. (res.) Kobi Agmon, to examine whether the videos Hezbollah released were authentic. The commission’s conclusion was that the videos were indeed genuine and that Hezbollah had somehow succeeded in downloading the transmissions from the drones.

Some of the footage released by Hezbollah was even taken during the actual operation in 1997. Hezbollah was apparently able to follow the Israeli troop movements on the ground, in real time, during the whole operation and the rescue effort. It was apparent that Israel had seriously underestimated Hezbollah technical capabilities. But the conclusions of the fourth commission of inquiry was not made public. It was first revealed by the Israeli news site Ynet in 2017, 20 years after the incident.

After these revelations the IDF started to encrypt video transmissions from drones.

== Israeli fatalities ==
From Shayetet 13

- Lt. Col. Yosef Korakin, 32, of Herzliya
- Maj. Yitzhak Bentov, 28, of Kfar Saba
- Capt. Ram Lavinas, 22, of Shavei Zion
- Capt. Zvi Grossman, 21, of Tel Aviv
- Sgt. Maj. Raz Tabbi, 22, of Rishon le-Zion
- Sgt. Maj. Arye Abramson, 22, of Yavne’el
- Sgt. Maj. Yochanan Hilberg, 22, of Netzer Hazani
- Staff Sgt. Guy Golan, 21, of Kibbutz Hatzor
- Sgt. Maj. Itamar Ilya, 22, of Arad
- Staff Sgt. Gal Rodovsky, 20, of Herzliya
- Staff Sgt. Yaniv Shamiel, 20, of Kiryat Haim

From Rescue Unit 669

- Capt. M.D. Dagesh Maher, 26, of Maghar

== Bibliography ==
Blanford, Nicholas, Warriors of God, Inside Hezbollah’s Thirty-Year Struggle Against Israel, New York, 2011

Bergman, Ronen, RISE AND KILL FIRST, The secret history of Israel's targeted assassinations, Random house, New York, 2018
