= Erez Gerstein =

Israeli general (1960–1999)

- ארז גרשטיין
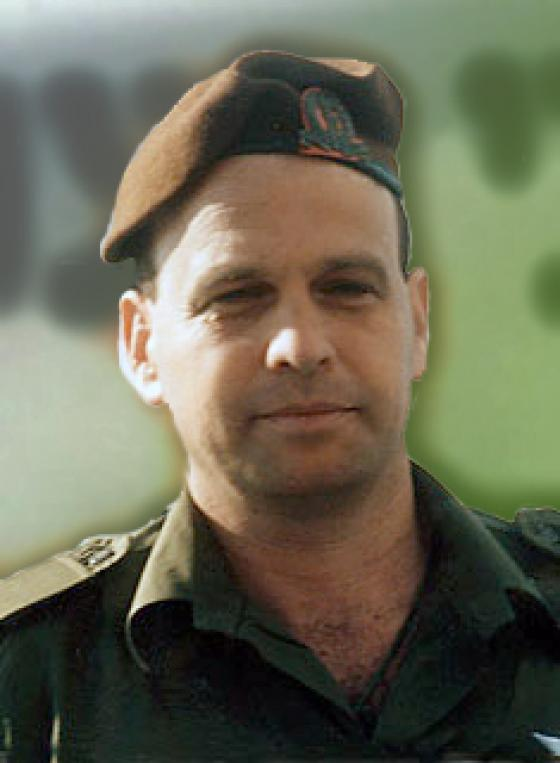
- Born: March 13, 1960; Afula, Israel
- Died: February 28, 1999 (aged 38); South Lebanon
- Military career
- Allegiance: Israel
- Branch: Israel Defense Forces
- Service years: 1979–1999
- Rank: Tat Aluf (Brigadier general)
- Unit: Golani Brigade
- Commands: Golani Brigade's 51 battalion, Regional Brigade in South Lebanon, Golani Brigade, the Lebanon of Israel Defense Forces
- Conflicts: 1982 Lebanon War; South Lebanon conflict (1985–2000) †

Erez Gerstein (Hebrew: ארז גרשטיין; March 13, 1960 – February 28, 1999) was an Israeli Brigadier General (Tat Aluf) who commanded the Israel Defense Forces Lebanon Liaison Unit and died in the South Lebanon conflict (1985–2000) with Hezbollah and Lebanese proxy militias.

== Early life ==
Gerstein was born in Afula, and was the eldest of three children. His mother, Shula Kishik, was an immigrant from Syria, and his father, Rafael Gerstein, was from Argentina. He was raised in kibbutz Reshafim, where he attended elementary and high school. He spent a Service Year volunteering on kibbutz Harel before his military service.

Gerstein had a son named Omer, who would eventually follow in his footsteps and become an officer in the IDF.

== Military service ==
Gerstein was drafted into the IDF in 1979, and volunteered for the Shayetet 13 naval commando force, but was dismissed after a year, and did his military service in the Golani Brigade. He served as a soldier, a squad leader in the brigade's reconnaissance company. In 1981 he became an infantry officer after completing Officer Candidate School and return to the Golani Brigade. In the 1982 Lebanon War he served as a platoon leader in the reconnaissance company and fought at the Battle of the Beaufort. Gerstein was injured during the battle but stayed on until the fighting was done. In February 1983, he left the army as a company commander, and in June of that year, he left Israel with his girlfriend on a backpacking trip throughout the Americas. He returned to Israel after a year, and joined Shin Bet, but during his training, he dropped out.

In 1985, Gerstein returned to active military service. He led the Brigade's Reconnaissance company and Golani Brigade's 51 battalion in counter-guerrilla operations in South Lebanon. Afterwards, he commanded a battalion in squad leader course and a Regional Brigade in South Lebanon.

In 1995 he was appointed as the commander of the Golani Brigade. He married his girlfriend that same year, and their son Omer was born in 1997. During this time, Gerstein led the brigade in a series of operations in southern Lebanon that resulted a great number of Hezbollah operatives killed. Afterwards he commanded the Lebanon Liaison Unit.

On March 2, 1999 Gerstein and two Israeli soldiers, Warrant Officer Imad Abu-Rish and Staff-Sergeant Omer El-Kabetz, had been accompanying Kol Israel reporter Ilan Roeh during a brief foray into South Lebanon in an armored vehicle. An IED laid by Hezbollah on the road between Ibl al-Saqi and Kaukaba exploded, killing everyone inside. In February 2018, the "Al-Manar" network released a video allegedly showing the explosion that killed Gerstein.
