= Ansariyeh, Lebanon =

Ansariyeh الأنصاريّة - Al Anṣārīyyah
- Municipality
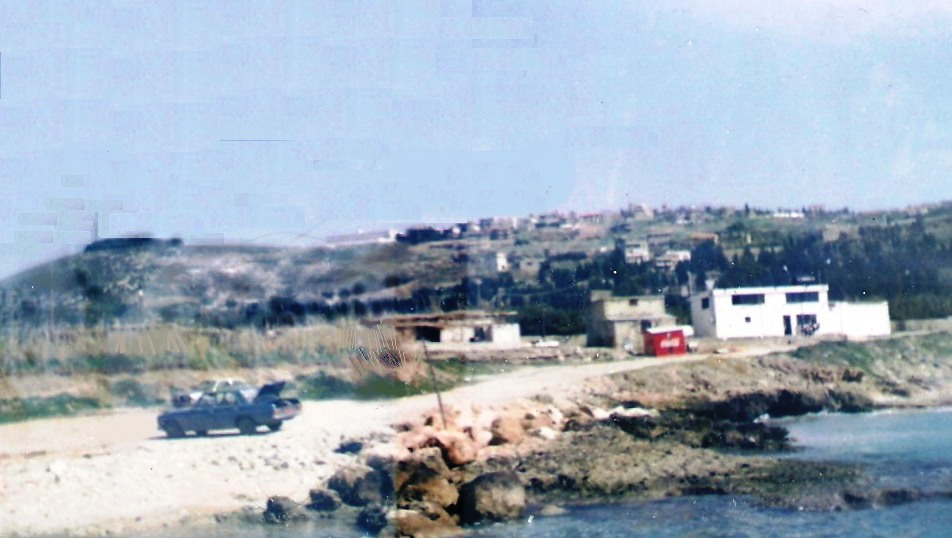
- View from the west.

- Location in Lebanon
- Coordinates: 33°25′0″N 35°17′0″E
- Country: Lebanon
- Governorate: South Governorate
- District: Sidon District
- Time zone: UTC+2 (EET)
  - Summer (DST): UTC+3 (EEST)

Ansariyeh, Ansariyah, or Insariye (Arabic: الأنصارية, romanized: al-ʾAnṣāriyah) is a municipality in South Governorate in Lebanon, 62 km from Beirut and 20 km south of Sidon. The area is 7.35 km² and is situated near the sea facing it from an altitude of 144 m.

== History ==
On 5 September 1997 an attack force of seaborne Israeli commandos was ambushed approaching Ansariyeh. The ambush had been prepared in advance by fighters from Amal and Hizbullah. The Lebanese army joined in the later stages of the incident. Twelve Israelis were killed.

== Demographics ==
In 2014, Muslims made up 99.51% of registered voters in Ansariyeh. 97.36% of the voters were Shiite Muslims.
