= Zrariyeh =

Zrariyeh الزرارية Zrarieh
- Municipality
- Location in Lebanon
- Coordinates: 33°20′30″N 35°19′58″E
- Country: Lebanon
- Governorate: South Governorate
- District: Sidon District
- Time zone: UTC+2 (EET)
  - Summer (DST): UTC+3 (EEST)

Zrariyeh (Arabic: الزرارية) is a municipality in southern Lebanon, located in the Sidon District. It is home to about 20,000 people, over half of whom are emigrants to West Africa, Europe and the Americas. The etymology of "Zrarieh" is derived from the Aramaic word for rose or flower. Zrarieh's residents are Shia Muslims by religious confession. Historically, the village has supported the Lebanese Communist Party though in more recent years, support has shifted to more mainstream Shia parties.

== History ==
In 1875, Victor Guérin passed by the village (which he called Zerarieh) on his travels in the region, noting that it "crowned a hill".

== Demographics ==
In 2014, Muslims made up 99.45% of registered voters in Zrariyeh. 98.41% of the voters were Shiite Muslims.

== Notable people ==
- Kamel Mrowa

== See also ==
- Zrarieh raid

== Bibliography ==
- Guérin, V. (1880). Description Géographique Historique et Archéologique de la Palestine (in French). Vol. 3: Galilee, pt. 2. Paris: L'Imprimerie Nationale.
