= Maarakeh bombing =

4 March 1985 mosque bombing

- Ruins of the mosque
- Location: 33°16′N 35°18′E; Maarakeh, Southern Lebanon
- Date: 4 March 1985
- Attack type: Terror bombing
- Deaths: 15
- Injuries: 55

The Maarakeh bombing took place on 4 March 1985, a bomb exploded in a Shiite religious center (Hussainiya) in the southern Lebanese village of Maarakeh. 15 people were killed, including two leaders of the Amal movement that was fighting Israel, and 55 were injured. Author Nicholas Blanford said that the bomb was "planted by the Israelis during the earlier raid" [on 2 March] while according to Robert Fisk, French intelligence in Lebanon believed that Israel planted the bomb. Israel denied involvement. In 2018, Ronen Bergman wrote in Rise and Kill First, that it was Mossad agents commanded by Meir Dagan who planted the bomb.

== Background ==
=== Israeli withdrawal plan ===
After it invaded Lebanon in 1982, Israel established a three-stage withdrawal plan. In February 1985, it implemented the first stage and relocated its forces south to the Litani river. On 3 March, one day before the attack, the cabinet approved the second stage.

=== 2 March raid ===
On 2 March, 800 Israeli soldiers raided Maarakeh. They searched the village's "Hussainiya" while keeping the residents outside, and arrested 17 men.

== Attack ==
Less than 30 hours after Israeli troops had left, a thirty-pound bomb planted on the second floor of the Hussainiya exploded, during a meeting held to discuss the distribution of the relief and food supplies. Mohammed Saad and Khalil Jradi, two members of the Amal Movement, were also killed. Within an hour of the explosion, IDF troops raided the main hospital in Tyre, sabotaged its assets and arrested the director as well as 20 blood donors.

== Aftermath ==
Lebanese radio stations asserted that the explosion was from a car that was booby-trapped, however earlier reports from the village said the bomb was planted on the second floor. IDF officials also initially said that the explosion was caused by a car bomb, however UNIFL spokesman Timur Goksel, said this was impossible as the blast took place on the 2nd floor.

Amal leader Nabih Berri called Saad and Jradi "martyrs" and denounced the massacre, saying: "[Israel] pretend they don't want anything from Lebanon more than their peace. This is the Israeli peace." President Amine Gemayel summoned envoys of the United States, the Soviet Union, China, France and the United Kingdom to seek their support as members of the UN Security Council for a complaint against Israel. Prime Minister Rashid Karami said that Israel has "lost its nerve and panicked", and Hezbollah criticized the US and Israel.

Israel denied any involvement. Coordinator of Israeli Affairs in Lebanon Uri Lubrani said that the bombing was part of an "internal conflict inside Amal".

According to Robert Fisk, French intelligence in Lebanon believed that Israel planted the bomb. Chris Mowles linked this attack with another bombing in Sidon, saying: "They strenuously denied involvement in the bombing, but never provided a satisfactory explanation of how anyone could have smuggled such a huge quantity of explosives into the South and past the myriad checkpoints that surrounded Sidon".

Journalist Ronen Bergman wrote in 2018 that Mossad operatives (under the command of Meir Dagan) were responsible for the attack.

In the aftermath of the attack Amal identified the collaborator who had alerted the Israelis that the meeting was taking place. He was executed and his family expelled from Maarakeh.
