= Maarakeh =

Maarakeh معركة
- Municipality
- Location within Lebanon
- Coordinates: 33°16′22″N 35°18′35″E
- Grid position: 179/297 PAL
- Country: Lebanon
- Governorate: South Governorate
- District: Tyre
- Elevation: 270 m (890 ft)
- Time zone: +2
  - Summer (DST): +3

Maarakeh (Levantine Arabic: معركة, romanized: Maʿrakeh), or Maarakah, is a municipality in Tyre District, in Lebanon.

== Geography ==
The Municipality of Maarakeh is located in the Kaza of Tyre (sour) one of Mohafazah of South Lebanon kazas (districts). Mohafazah of South Lebanon is one of the eight mohafazats (governorates) of Lebanon. It is 90 kilometers (55.9 mi) away from Beyrouth (Beirut) the capital of Lebanon. Its elevation is 270 meters (1) (886 ft - 295 yd) above sea level. Maarakeh surface stretches for 2000 hectares (20 km² - 7.7 mi²)(2).

== Etymology ==
E. H. Palmer wrote that the name Mảrakeh meant "The battle field".

== History ==
In 1596, it was named as a village, al-Ma'raka, in the Ottoman nahiya (subdistrict) of Tibnin under the liwa' (district) of Safad, with a population of 119 households and 3 bachelors, all Muslim. The villagers paid a fixed tax rate of 25% on agricultural products, such as wheat, barley, olive trees, fruit trees, cotton, goats and beehives, in addition to occasional revenues; a total of 13,350 akçe.

In 1875 Victor Guérin found that it had 700 Metawileh inhabitants. He further noted: "Here are uprights and lintels of door with cut stones, apparently ancient; and in a small mosque, built of regular blocks probably taken from an old church, are several fragments of monolithic columns.'"

In 1881, the PEF's Survey of Western Palestine (SWP) described it as: "A village, built of stone, containing about 400 Metawileh, on flat top of high ground, surrounded by gardens, olives, figs, palms, and arable land. There is a spring and five cisterns."

On 28 June 1984 the Israeli army surrounded the town and began house to house searches. 119 men, aged between 13 and 60, were taken away as prisoners for further interrogation. At the time it was estimated that Maarakah had a population of 13,000.

On 4 March 1985, during the Israeli occupation of Southern Lebanon, an explosion destroyed a mosque killing local resistance leader, Mohammed Saad. At least 15 people were killed in the explosion.

== Demographics ==
In 2014 Muslims made up 99.71% of registered voters in Maarakah. 99.17% of the voters were Shiite Muslims.

== Education ==
Educational establishments	Maarakeh (2005-2006)	Lebanon (2005–2006)
Number of Schools	5	2,788
Public School	3	1,763
Private School	2	1,025
Students schooled in the public schools	1,596	439,905
Students schooled in the private schools	271	471,409

== Notable people ==
- Kassem El Zein (born 1990), Lebanese footballer

== Bibliography ==
- Conder, C.R.; Kitchener, H.H. (1881). The Survey of Western Palestine: Memoirs of the Topography, Orography, Hydrography, and Archaeology. Vol. 1. London: Committee of the Palestine Exploration Fund.
- Guérin, V. (1880). Description Géographique Historique et Archéologique de la Palestine (in French). Vol. 3: Galilee, pt. 2. Paris: L'Imprimerie Nationale.
- Hütteroth, W.-D.; Abdulfattah, K. (1977). Historical Geography of Palestine, Transjordan and Southern Syria in the Late 16th Century. Erlanger Geographische Arbeiten, Sonderband 5. Erlangen, Germany: Vorstand der Fränkischen Geographischen Gesellschaft. ISBN 3-920405-41-2.
- Palmer, E.H. (1881). The Survey of Western Palestine: Arabic and English Name Lists Collected During the Survey by Lieutenants Conder and Kitchener, R. E. Transliterated and Explained by E.H. Palmer. Committee of the Palestine Exploration Fund.
- Rhode, H. (1979). Administration and Population of the Sancak of Safed in the Sixteenth Century. Columbia University. Archived from the original on 2016-10-10.
