= Flotta Lauro Lines =

Italian freighter fleet company (1947–1989)

- Industry: Transportation
- Founded: 1947; 79 years ago Naples, Italy
- Founder: Gioacchino Lauro
- Defunct: 1989
- Successor: MSC Cruises
- Area served: Worldwide
- Products: Cruises

Flotta Lauro began as one of the largest Italian freighter fleets of the time founded by Gioacchino Lauro, and would eventually go on to operate passenger fleet from the end of WWII to the late 1980s.

== History ==
Achille Lauro (1887–1982) inherited his first ships in 1912, and built up a substantial fleet of around 50 freighters before World War II. After the war, he ventured into the emigrant market, with the converted freighters Ravello, Olimpia and Napoli.

Sydney and Roma were rebuilt from World War II aircraft carriers during 1948–1951. They carried 800 passengers on the Italy-Australia route and set a whole new standard in migrant transportation offering superior surroundings and a touch of Italian Flair! Roma was scrapped in 1967, and Sydney was later used on Mediterranean cruising.

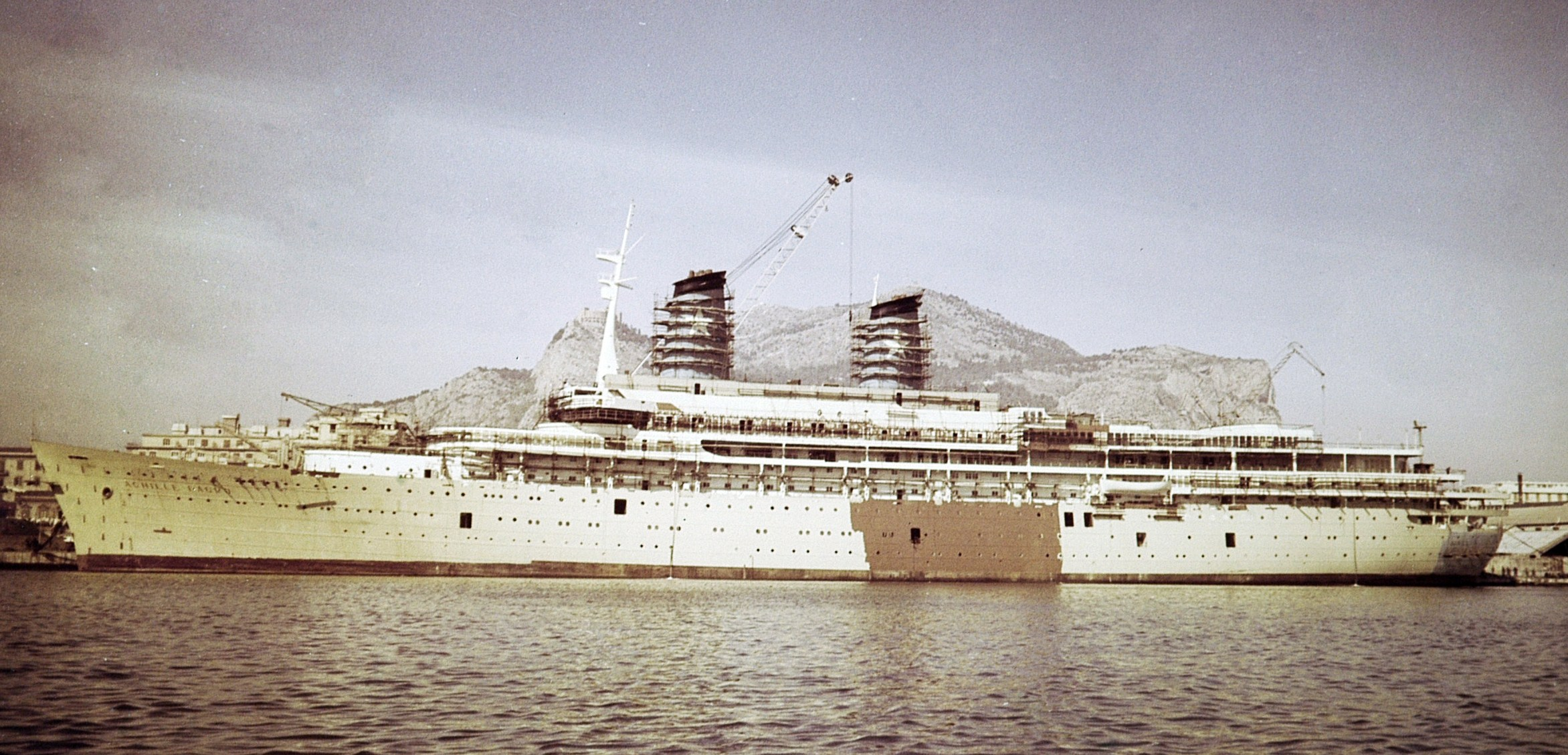
Former Willem Ruys being converted in the Achille Lauro

The line's first real passenger ship was the Surriento, an ex-Grace Line ship which sailed from US ports to South America and the Caribbean between 1913 and 1970. Formerly the Santa Maria, the Surriento was bought in 1949 and refitted to carry 187 first class and 868 tourist class passengers on the Australian migrant trade. Originally, she retained her two funnels from Grace Line days, reduced to one when refitted in 1959.

In 1964 the Oranje (Nederland Line) was sold to Flotta Lauro Line, who renamed her Angelina Lauro. In 1972 she became a fulltime cruise ship but was destroyed by a galley fire during a Caribbean cruise in March 1979.

The Willem Ruys (launched in 1946) was purchased Flotta Lauro in 1964 and re-named after her new owner.

In 1985 the Achille Lauro was hijacked by members of the Palestine Liberation Front as she was sailing from Alexandria to Port Said. Holding the passengers and crew hostage, they directed the vessel to sail to Tartus, Syria, and demanded the release of 50 Palestinians in Israeli prisons. After being refused permission to dock at Tartus, the hijackers killed a disabled American passenger Leon Klinghoffer and then threw his body overboard. At Port Said, and after two days of negotiations, the hijackers agreed to abandon the liner in exchange for safe conduct and as they were flown towards Tunisia the plane was intercepted by US fighter aircraft and directed to land in Sicily, where the hijackers were arrested and later tried for murder.

=== Fleet Purchased by MSC ===
After the much-publicized event passenger numbers dropped and in the late 1980s, the remaining Flotta Lauro fleet was purchased by Mediterranean Shipping Company with the new Line called StarLauro, and in 1995, the company name was changed MSC Cruises.

== Fleet ==
	Image	Years in Service for Lauro	Fate	Notes
Ravello		1947–1971	Scrapped 1971	Converted cargo ship
Napoli		1948–1971	Scrapped 1971	Built as the Araybank (Bank Line) in 1940. She was bombed and abandoned in Cretan waters in 1941. In 1947 she was salvaged and purchased by Achille Lauro and rebuilt as an emigrant-carrier
Surriento		1949–1966	Scrapped 1966	Built as the Grace Line's Santa Maria
Roma		1950–1966	Scrapped 1967	Originally completed in 1943 as a light aircraft carrier which was passed to Great Britain under lend-lease and renamed HMS Atheling
Sydney/Roma		1951–1970	Scrapped 1975	Converted naval ship HMS Fencer (D64), and was an American-built Attacker-class escort carrier that served with the Royal Navy during the Second World War. Later renamed Roma.
Angelina Lauro		1964–1979	Burned in 1979 at St Thomas, total loss, sank on way to scrapyard	Completed in 1939 as Oranje, of Nederland Line
Achille Lauro		1964–1987	Burned and sank off South Africa in 1994	Originally laid down in January 1939, shortly before the outbreak of WW2. Completed as Willem Ruys, finally launched in July 1946, and delivered in November 1947.
Oceanos		1970s	Sank 1991	Chartered
Daphne		1978	Scrapped 2014	Chartered
