= MS Achille Lauro =

Cruise ship launched in 1946

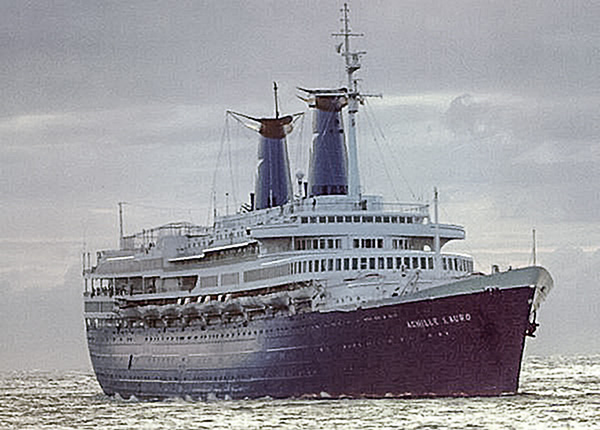
- Achille Lauro

History
- Name: Willem Ruys (1947–1965); Achille Lauro (1965–1994)
- Namesake: Willem Ruys; Achille Lauro
- Owner: 1947–1965: Royal Rotterdam Lloyd; 1965–1989: Achille Lauro FU G. & C.; 1989–1994: Star Lauro S.P.A.
- Operator: Royal Rotterdam Lloyd (1947–1964); Flotta Lauro Lines (1965–1989); StarLauro (1989–1994)
- Port of registry: 1947–1965: (Netherlands) Rotterdam; 1965–1994: (Italy) Naples
- Ordered: 7 May 1938
- Builder: KM 'De Schelde' S&M, Vlissingen
- Yard number: 214
- Laid down: 25 January 1939
- Launched: 1 July 1946 (Delayed due to WWII)
- Christened: by HM Queen Wilhelmina
- Completed: 21 November 1947
- Maiden voyage: 2 December 1947
- In service: 2 December 1947
- Out of service: 30 November 1994
- Identification: Call sign: PIQF → IBHE; IMO number: 5390008
- Fate: Sank on 2 December 1994 off the coast of Somalia due to fire on board.

General characteristics
- Class & type: Ocean liner later Cruise ship
- Tonnage: 21,119 GRT as built; 23,629 GRT after refurbishment
- Length: 642 ft (196 m)
- Beam: 82 ft (25 m)
- Draft: 29.3 ft (8.9 m)
- Decks: 9 (6 passenger accessible)
- Installed power: 2 × Sulzer/ Winterthur + 6 × Sulzer/de Schelde; 32,000 bhp (24,000 kW)
- Propulsion: 2 propellers
- Speed: 22.0 kn (40.7 km/h; 25.3 mph)
- Capacity: 869 passengers (as built); 1,372 passengers
- Crew: 300

MS Achille Lauro was a cruise ship based in Naples, Italy. It was built between 1939 and 1947 as the ocean liner Willem Ruys for Royal Rotterdam Lloyd. In 1965 Achille Lauro bought the ship, had it converted into a cruise ship, and renamed it after himself. In 1985 it was hijacked by members of the Palestinian Liberation Front.

The ship was also involved in two serious collisions: in 1953 with the Oranje, and in 1975 with the cargo ship Youseff. It also suffered four onboard fires or explosions: in 1965, 1972, 1981, and 1994. In the last of these, in 1994, the ship caught fire and sank in the Indian Ocean off Somalia.

== Concept and construction ==
Ordered in 1938 to replace the aging ships on the Dutch East Indies route, she was laid down in 1939 at Koninklijke Maatschappij 'De Schelde'. Scheepswerf en Machinefabriek in Vlissingen, Netherlands, for Rotterdamsche Lloyd (now part of Nedlloyd). Interrupted by World War II and two bombing raids, the ship was finally launched in July 1946, as Willem Ruys. The ship was named after the grandson of the founder of Rotterdamsche Lloyd, whom the Germans had taken hostage and shot during the war.

Willem Ruys was completed in late 1947. At that time, the Rotterdamsche Lloyd had been granted a royal prefix in honour of its services during the war. Willem Ruys was 192 metres (630 ft) in length, 25 metres (82 ft) in beam, had a draught of 8.9 metres (29.2 ft), and measured 21,119 gross register tons. Eight Sulzer engines drove two propellers. She could accommodate 900 passengers. She featured a superstructure very different from other liners of that era; Willem Ruys pioneered low-slung aluminium lifeboats, within the upper-works' flanks. The next ship to adopt this arrangement was the Canberra in 1961. Today, all cruise ships follow this layout, with fibreglass-reinforced plastic (FRP) used for lifeboat hulls.

== Service history ==
=== As the Willem Ruys ===
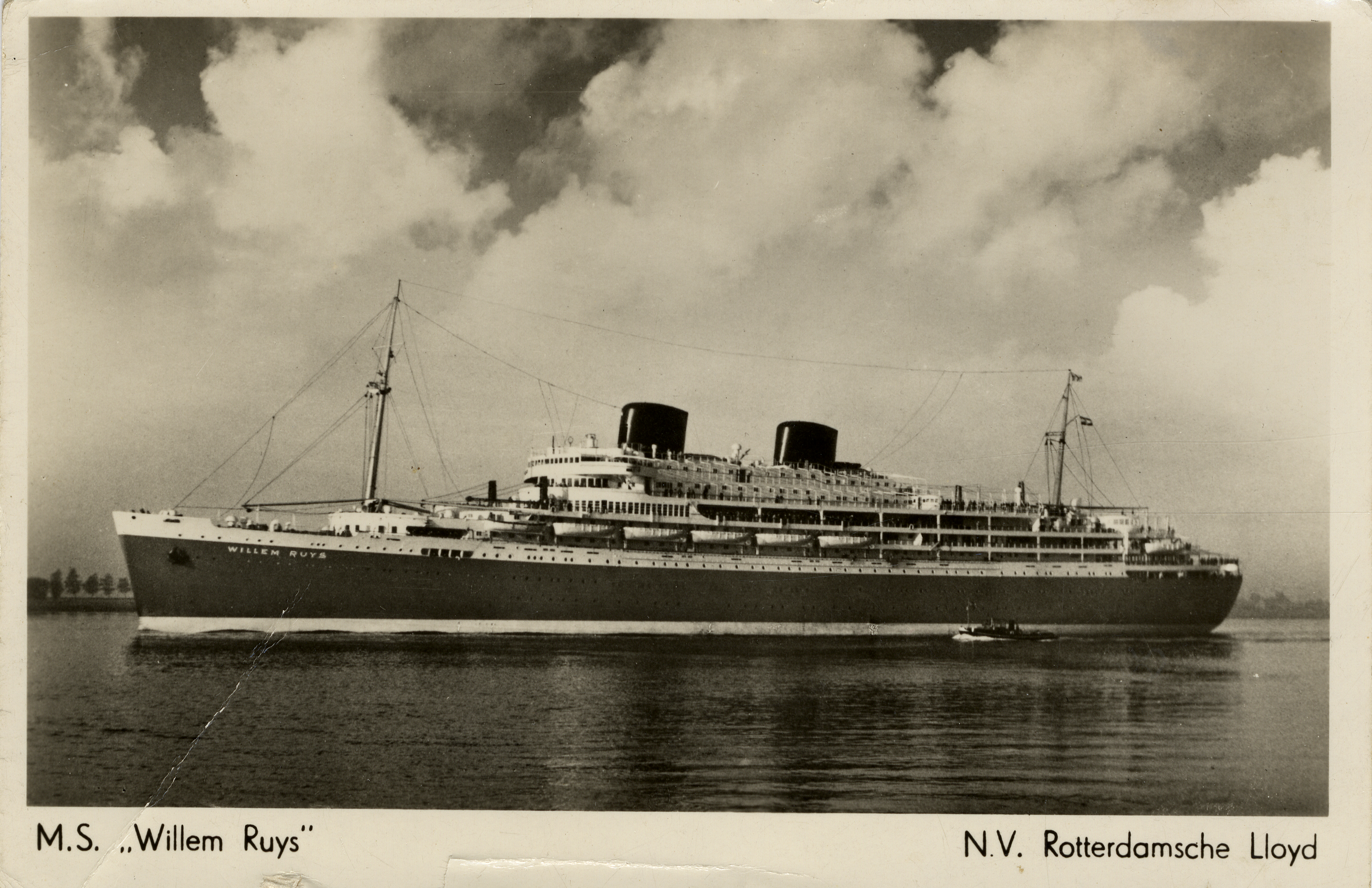
MS Willem Ruys

==== On the East Indies route ====
As Willem Ruys, the ship began her maiden voyage on 5 December 1947. Together with her main competitor and running mate, the MS Oranje of the Netherland Line, she became a popular fixture on the Dutch East Indies route. However, when the East Indies gained independence from The Netherlands in 1949, passenger numbers decreased.

The future prime minister of Singapore, Lee Kuan Yew, travelled aboard Willem Ruys as a fresh graduate upon completing his studies in the United Kingdom.

==== Collision with Oranje ====
On 6 January 1953, Willem Ruys collided in the Red Sea with running mate Oranje, which was heading in the opposite direction. At that time, it was common for passenger ships to pass each other at close range to entertain their passengers. During the (later heavily criticized) abrupt and fast approach of Oranje, Willem Ruys made an unexpected swing to the left, resulting in a collision. Oranje badly damaged her bow. Due to the possibility that she would be impounded for safety reasons, she was unable to call at Colombo as scheduled, and went directly to Jakarta. Willem Ruys suffered less damage. There was no loss of life involved. Later, it was determined that miscommunication on both ships had caused the collision.

==== Collision with "Cornelis B" ====
Later in 1953 on 26 June she collided with and sank the Dutch coastal tanker "Cornelis B" in dense fog about 19 miles northwest of Ile de Batz (48°57′N 04°23′W).

==== Journey to Java ====
During 1957, the English diplomat, author and diarist Harold Nicolson and his wife, the author and poet Vita Sackville-West, toured the Far East for two months aboard Willem Ruys. The voyage is documented in Journey to Java, his published journal of the trip, which provides a detailed account of first class travel on the vessel in the 1950s interlarded with rambling literary reflections.

==== Later years ====
After repairs, Royal Rotterdam Lloyd decided to release Willem Ruys on the North Atlantic run. First, she was placed on the New York service, and later Canada was included.

In 1958, the Royal Rotterdamsche Lloyd and the Netherland Line signed a co-operative agreement to create a round-the-world passenger service. The joint fleet would sail under the banner of "The Royal Dutch Mail Ships". Together with Oranje and Johan van Oldenbarneveldt, Willem Ruys underwent an extensive refit to prepare her for this new service. She made two charter trips to Montreal for the Europa-Canada service. Then, from 20 September 1958, until 25 February 1959, she underwent a major facelift at the Wilton-Fijenoord shipyard in Schiedam, turning her from a passenger liner into a cruise ship. Her original four class distinctions became First and Tourist Class. A hundred new cabins were installed and air-conditioning was extended throughout all accommodations. The Javanese crew members were replaced by Europeans, who required upgraded crew accommodation. Externally, she was fitted with a new glazing in Tourist Class Wintergarden, her forward funnel was heightened and stabilizers were fitted. Willem Ruys was now able to accommodate 275 first class and 770 tourist class passengers, although there were many interchangeable cabins which had additional berths fitted, which could increase the maximum passenger number to 1167. Her new specifications would see her tonnage increase from 21,119 to 23,114 gross register ton.

On 7 March 1959, Willem Ruys went off on her new world service to Australia and New Zealand. She departed from Rotterdam, sailing via Southampton, the Mediterranean, the Suez Canal, Fremantle, Melbourne, Sydney, New Zealand, returning via the Panama Canal. The Royal Dutch Mail Ships (Willem Ruys, Johan van Oldenbarnevelt and Oranje) became a popular alternative to the British liners.

At the end of 1964, due to a strong drop in passenger numbers, Willem Ruys was laid up in Rotterdam and put up for sale.

=== As Achille Lauro ===
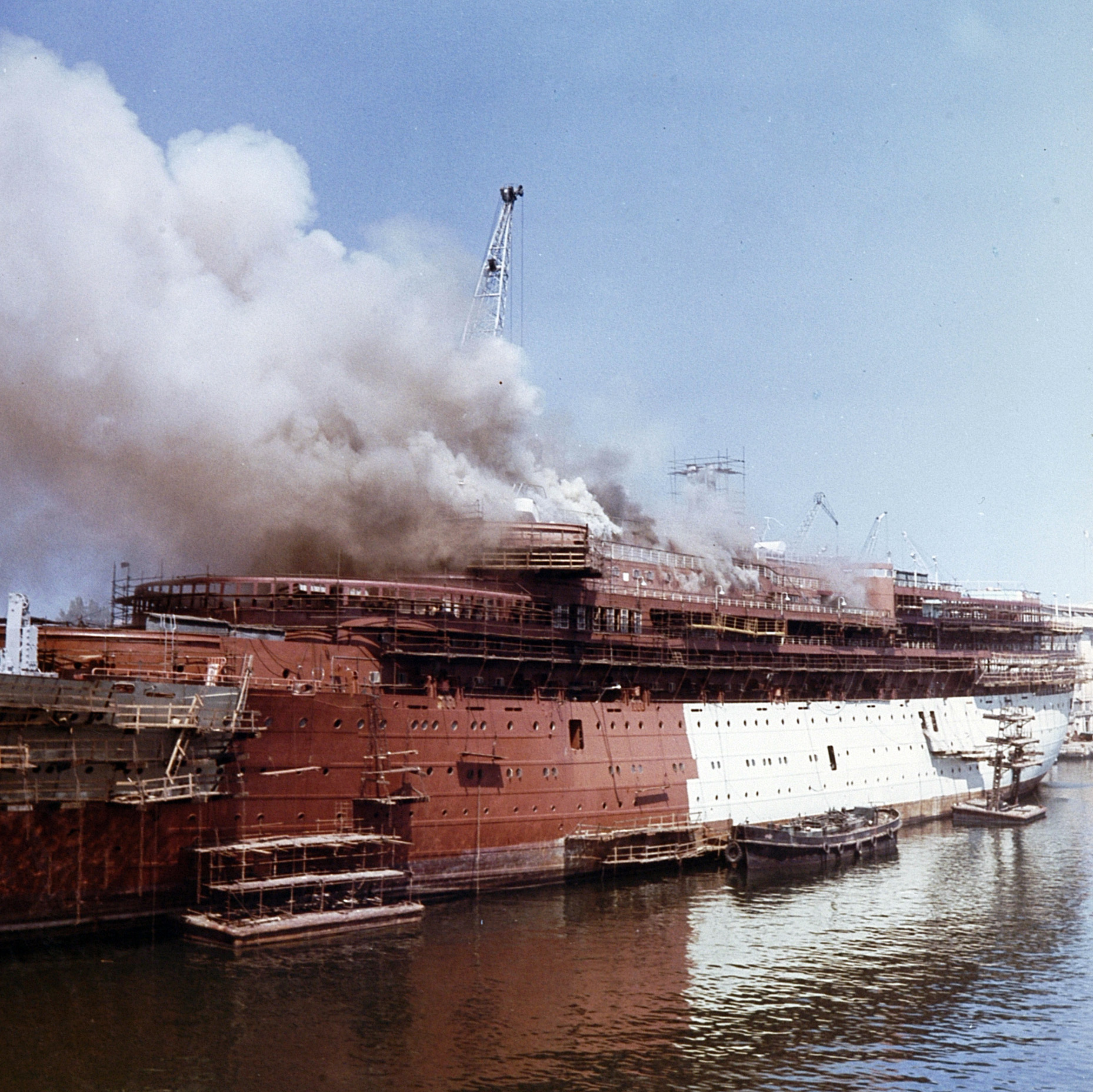
The Achille Lauro on fire during her conversion work in 1965

In 1965, she was sold to the Flotta Lauro Line and renamed Achille Lauro after the company's owner. She was extensively rebuilt and modernized after an August 1965 onboard explosion, and entered service in 1966 carrying passengers to Sydney, Australia. The ship played a role in evacuating the families of British servicemen caught up in unrest in Aden, and made one of the last northbound transits through the Suez Canal before its closure during the Six-Day War.

Achille Lauro was converted to a cruise ship in early 1972, during which time she suffered a disastrous fire. A 1975 collision with the cargo ship Youseff resulted in the sinking of the latter, and another onboard fire in 1981 took her out of service for a time. She was laid up in Tenerife when Lauro Lines went bankrupt in 1982. The Chandris Line took possession of her under a charter arrangement in 1985, shortly before the hijacking.

The ship was chartered by a private group for the duration of the 1987 America's Cup series held in Fremantle, Western Australia, to act as a viewing platform and accommodation for 1,400 visitors. It also housed the international jury which oversaw the races.

==== 1985 hijacking ====
On 7 October 1985, four members of the Palestinian Liberation Front (PLF) took control of the liner off Egypt as she was sailing from Alexandria to Port Said. Holding the passengers and crew hostage, they directed the vessel to sail to Tartus, Syria, and demanded the release of 50 Palestinians then in Israeli prisons. After being refused permission to dock at Tartus, the hijackers killed disabled Jewish-American passenger Leon Klinghoffer and then threw his body overboard.

The ship then headed back towards Port Said, and after two days of negotiations, the hijackers agreed to abandon the liner in exchange for safe conduct and were flown towards Tunisia aboard an Egyptian commercial airliner. This airliner, however, was intercepted by U.S. Navy F-14 Tomcat fighter aircraft and directed to land in Sicily. There, the United States Delta Force unsuccessfully attempted to extract the hijackers in order to try them in the United States, thereby causing the Sigonella Crisis. The four terrorists were ultimately sentenced to prison terms by the Italian courts, while the operation's mastermind, who had not taken part in the actual hijacking, was given passage to Yugoslavia and escaped.

==== Later years, fire, and sinking ====
The ship continued in service. She was re-flagged in 1989 when the Lauro Line was taken over by the Mediterranean Shipping Company to become "StarLauro".

Several episodes of the Australian soap opera Neighbours were filmed onboard the Achille Lauro during 1991 as the setting for Paul and Christina Robinson's honeymoon.

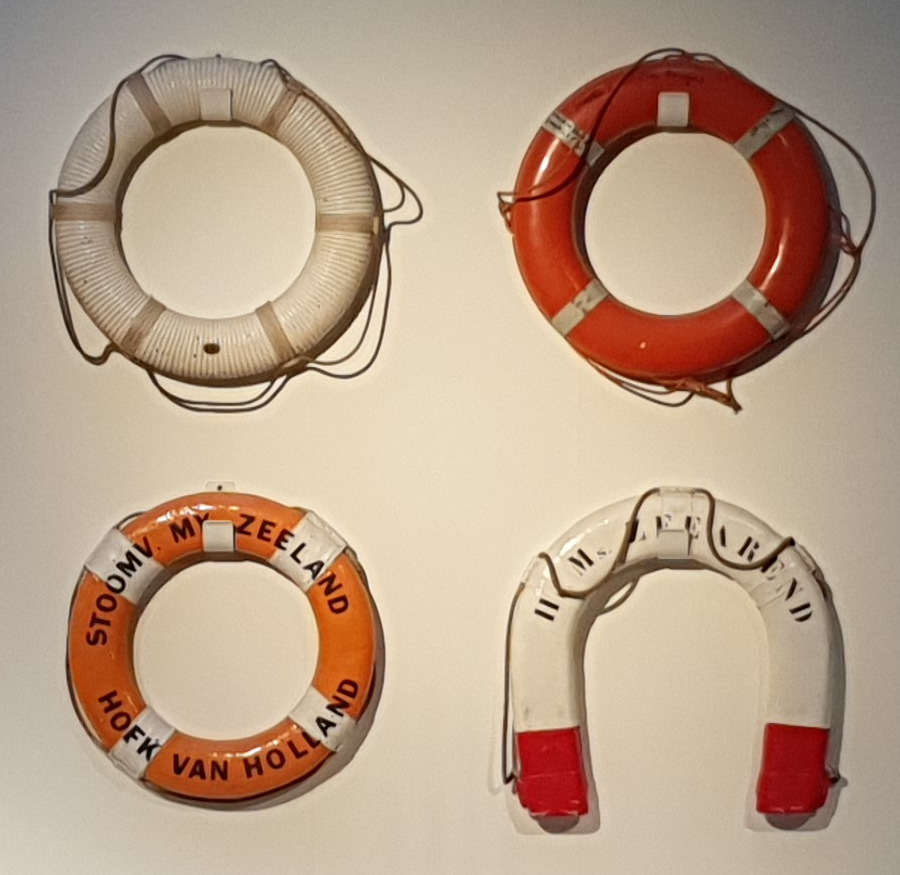
Lifebuoy from the Achille Lauro (at top right), now on display in the Rotterdam Maritime Museum

In the evening of 30 November 1994 she caught fire off the coast of Somalia while en route to South Africa, with 979 passengers and crew aboard. At that time, Italian officials said the fire had been caused by a discarded cigarette. Later analysis suggests that the fire started in the engine room after one of the crankcases exploded which allowed cooling oil to get into the exhaust. Because of a lack of supervision, the fire burned out of control before its discovery. The crew battled the fire unsuccessfully for several hours, first with hoses and then by passing buckets from the swimming pool. Entertainer Moss Hills, who led rescue efforts during the sinking of MTS Oceanos in 1991, recalled that pouring water on an oil fire was ineffective, while making the conflagration worse. The vessel was abandoned in the morning after developing a list. A small number of crew and passengers were unable to board the main lifeboats due to flames coming up from the hull, so they climbed down a rope ladder from the stern to reach inflatable boats. Two died and eight were injured during the evacuation and transfer to rescue ships. Among the ships that responded to the call were USS Gettysburg and USS Halyburton. Achille Lauro sank on 2 December 1994, which was witnessed by a fire tugboat that had arrived to assess salvageability. The wreck has not been located since.

== See also ==
- Lauro Lines v. Chasser, a U.S. Supreme Court case dealing with the Achille Lauro hijacking
- The Hijacking of the Achille Lauro, 1989 film
- Voyage of Terror: The Achille Lauro Affair, 1990 film
- The Death of Klinghoffer, 1991 opera
- List of hostage crises
- 1979 Nahariya attack
