= Crisis of Sigonella =

Diplomatic crisis between Italy and the United States

Sigonella crisis
- Part of Cold War and Arab–Israeli conflict
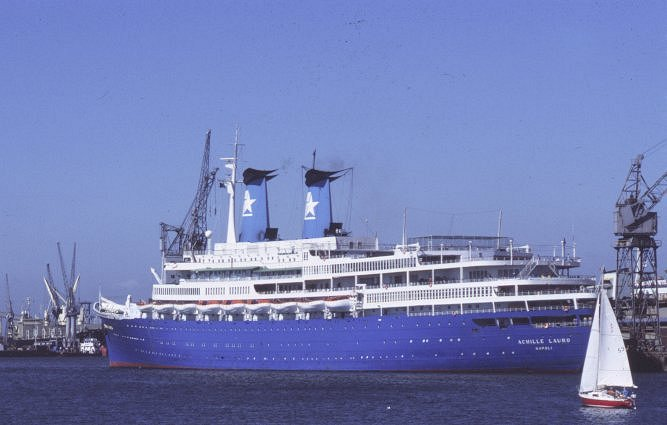
- Achille Lauro
Date	October 7–12, 1985
Location	Naval Air Station Sigonella, Italy
Result	Italian victory: Withdrawal of the Delta Force

Belligerents
Italy	United States
- Caused by the hijacking of the liner MS Achille Lauro and murder of an American passenger

The Sigonella crisis (named after the air base at which it originated, in Sicily) was a diplomatic case between Italy and the United States that occurred in October 1985.

The incident risked escalating into an armed confrontation between VAM (Vigilanza Aeronautica Militare, an Italian Air Force unit responsible for internal security) and Carabinieri on one side, and Delta Force (a special force unit of the U.S. Army) soldiers on the other, in the aftermath of a political rupture between Italian Prime Minister Bettino Craxi and U.S. President Ronald Reagan about the fate of the Palestinian terrorists who had hijacked and diverted the Italian cruise ship Achille Lauro, killing an American passenger. Reagan asked Craxi to extradite the terrorists, but the Italian Prime Minister categorically refused, ordering that since the hijack had taken place on an Italian ship, the trial of the terrorists would be the sole responsibility of the Italian judiciary.

The crisis was resolved overnight, with the removal of hostile foreign military forces from the Sigonella base. The four Palestinian terrorists were all tried and convicted in Italy. However, one of the suspects, Abu Abbas, was acquitted and allowed to leave the country. Only years later the American claim about his direct involvement in the attack was confirmed.

The reconciliation between the U.S. president and the Italian Prime Minister occurred a month after the incident, when Reagan invited Craxi to the White House. However, the Sigonella crisis marked a rift within the Italian government, as the Italian Minister of Defence Giovanni Spadolini, leader of the Italian Republican Party and a staunch supporter of the American government, harshly criticized Craxi's actions in a letter and withdrew the Republican Party ministers from the cabinet.

== October 7 and 8: Achille Lauro hijacking and murder of Leon Klinghoffer ==
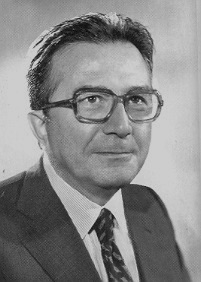
The then Italian Foreign Minister Giulio Andreotti

On October 7, 1985, the Italian cruise ship Achille Lauro, at 1:07pm, as it was preparing to leave Egyptian waters to dock in Israel, was seized by four armed Palestinian terrorists who had snuck on board with false passports. The terrorists, caught by a crew member handling weapons intended for one of their planned missions while landing in the Israeli port of Ashdod, reacted abruptly and, after a shootout involving the crew member (who was wounded in the leg), seized the ship.

However, the ship managed to send a mayday, picked up in Sweden, reporting the hijacking by terrorists, who were demanding the release of 50 of their comrades imprisoned in Israel. They claimed to be members of the Palestine Liberation Organization (PLO), but actually belonged to the pro-Syrian faction of one of its minority components, the Popular Front for the Liberation of Palestine (FPLP).

Upon receiving the news, Italian foreign minister Giulio Andreotti and defence minister Giovanni Spadolini set about a negotiation that, from the outset, appeared particularly complex and highly risky, not least in light of the different political views within the Italian government. Spadolini summoned all the top leaders of the armed forces and counterintelligence. Andreotti, in the evening, convened the crisis unit at the Farnesina, immediately activating his diplomatic channels, owing to his historic friendship with the moderate Arab world whose policies he supported. The foreign minister was handed the "Asad" chapter by Prime Minister Bettino Craxi: Hafiz al-Asad was his privileged contact in the area and he knew him well. At that time he was considered a "decisive point, also because the hijacked ship seemed to be aiming for a docking right in Syria, in Tartus." Andreotti managed to "find the Syrian dictator within hours: he even tracked him down in Germany, where Asad was secretly residing in those days because he had to undergo surgery. As it is equally obvious that the Syrian leader immediately moved in our favor not only because he was familiar with the Italian minister who spoke to him on the phone. Asad acted immediately and harshly, forcing those in control of the ship to reverse course and head back to the waters off Egypt."

At 10:10 p.m. from the Port Said harbor master's office, the commando's first claim and demand was picked up over the radio, which was for the release of 50 of their fellow Palestinians held in the Israeli camp in Nahariya. The threat for failure to comply was to blow up the ship.

After a telephone call between Andreotti and Yasser Arafat (who was the chairman of the PLO, as well as head of al-Fatah, the most important force within the PLO), the Palestinian leader in a press release let it be known that he was totally uninvolved in the events of the kidnapping. Meanwhile, the foreign minister managed to get in touch with the Egyptian political leadership to be able to facilitate a negotiation, while Prime Minister Craxi also managed to secure the support of the president of Tunisia (the PLO was in Tunisia at the time).

On the night of October 7–8, after a summit at the Ministry of Defence and once the authorizations from the United Kingdom and the United States had been obtained, Operation Margherita officially got underway, involving the mobilization of four transport helicopters with 60 paratroopers, raiders and scouts to pinpoint the ship's location. (Note: Incursors from the "Teseo Tesei" grouping are transferred by helicopter to the flagship Vittorio Veneto, and from there four helicopters carrying 60 paratroopers from the IX "Col Moschin" Assault Regiment depart from there; from Sicily, on the other hand, air force scouts depart to locate the Achille Lauro: "Achille Lauro". colmoschin.it (in Italian). Archived from the original on 24 November 2015.) Immediately afterwards, Craxi, Andreotti and Spadolini arranged to meet at Palazzo Chigi for a nighttime summit.

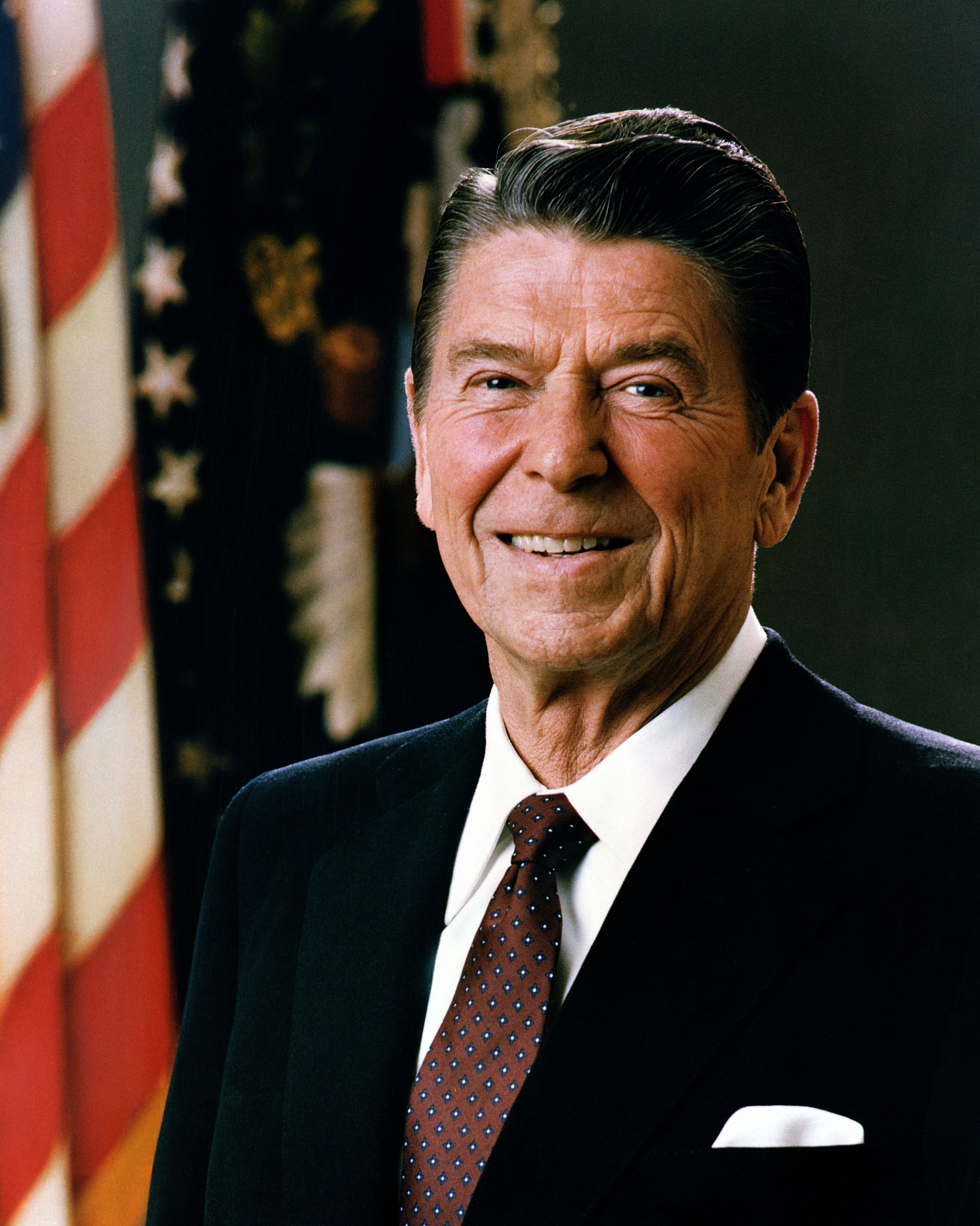
U.S. President Ronald Reagan

On the same night Arafat sent a personal message to Craxi and Andreotti: "Two emissaries of mine are on their way to Cairo and will accompany the Egyptian authorities. From the first reports it seems that the group is pro-Syrian." The two envoys were Hani El Hassan (one of Arafat's chief aides) and Abu Abbas, founding head of the FPLP, whose idea for the failed hostage-taking plan in Ashdod was only later revealed.

Andreotti and Craxi expressed support for diplomatic negotiations to "avoid a tragedy," but were warned by the US ambassador that US President Ronald Reagan would oppose any negotiations with the terrorists. Craxi lamented how the U.S. obstructed Italy by failing to provide information picked up by their satellites. The ship headed to Syria and stationed off the coast of Tartus, where the hijackers asked to enter the port: the Syrian government informed Italy that it would only allow docking following the opening of direct negotiations between the Italian government and the terrorists; the U.S. objected.

The terrorists then demanded a negotiation mediated by the International Red Cross with the ambassadors of Italy, the US, the UK, and West Germany. Meanwhile, on the ship, the situation degenerated: the terrorists repeatedly threatened to kill all the passengers, starting with U.S. citizens. Leon Klinghoffer, a Jewish and paraplegic U.S. citizen, was killed and thrown overboard. However, the hijackers did not continue to carry out their threat, except by simulating it with several gunshots that intimidated crew and passengers.

== October 9 and 10: the surrender of the hijackers and the discovery of the murder ==
The Syrian government sought to insert itself into the handling of the affair, speculating an attack to free the ship; also in reaction, the US government threatened armed intervention on the ship to free the passengers. The first position found Andreotti in agreement; Craxi, who was opposed a priori to an action of force, replied that, in case the assault should take place, it should be led by the Italian armed forces, even if inter-force with American Marines and Special Air Service (SAS); in fact, the instructions to the soldiers who were on board stipulated that, since it was Italian territory, Italian special forces raiders would go up. Thirty years later Craxi's former diplomatic adviser, Ambassador Antonio Badini, revealed that in this position Craxi was following the line, shared by the U.S., of marginalizing the Syrian role as an expression of anti-Western radicalism. (Note: Antonio Badini: "Craxi had understood the Palestinian question," in l'Unità December 4, 2015, drawing on the speeches (the one given by the same and those of Gennaro Acquaviva and Maurizio Caprara, among others) at the conference "Sigonella (thirty years later: 1985–2015), edited by the Socialism Association and Mondoperaio, Rome, Palazzo Giustiniani, October 16, 2015; "Sigonella. Una riflessione trent'anni dopo" [Sigonella. A reflection thirty years later]. Radio Radicale (in Italian). 16 October 2015. Archived from the original on 17 October 2015. Badini recalled that as early as a year ago – following the Tunis raid – Craxi had received a mandate from the European Council to support the creation of an anti-radical option that would activate the Middle East peace process through the establishment of a joint Jordanian-Palestinian delegation, which was supposed to open an alternative negotiating channel with Israel to the radical option based on the design for the destruction of the Jewish state: the design aborted because Shimon Peres, after giving guarantees, would shirk the commitment.)

Achille Lauro, having been ordered away from the Syrian coast, (Note: "Andreotti manages to find Assad in Czechoslovakia. The latter would like to stay out of it but, as a personal favor, he agrees that the Achille Lauro will dock in the harbor, on the condition that Italy and the United States open a dialogue and do not take any actions of force. He leaves an hour to decide. Craxi desperately tries to convince Rabb, but he refuses: the U.S. does not negotiate with terrorists. Negotiations fail and Damascus denies permission to dock." Zuliani, Nicolò (29 May 2020). "Quella volta che a Sigonella Craxi rese l'Italia un paese sovrano" [That time in Sigonella Craxi made Italy a sovereign country]. The Vision (in Italian). Archived from the original on 14 March 2022.) returned to Port Said at the request of Abbas who, with the authorization of the Italian government, managed to get the terrorists to surrender after promising them a diplomatic escape route to another Arab country. This solution was supported by the PLO and managed by the Italian government on the condition that no crimes had been committed on board. The ship's commander, De Rosa (Note: In his book Terrorism, Force Ten (Mondadori), Commander Gerardo De Rosa claimed that his condition of isolation had not allowed him, at the time of the conversation, to be aware of the crime, which he only learned about later, upon release ("The pirates gave me a passport then told me they had killed a passenger. One of them had blood on his shoes and the bottom of his pants." For another version, at the time of the request from Rome De Rosa was still under the threat of terrorist fire and was forced, therefore, not to reveal the killing of Leon Klinghoffer: this version was referred to by Giulio Andreotti in La politica estera italiana negli anni ottanta, p. 117 ("Some things are still not clear to me. One, for example, is this: how is it possible that a crew then composed not of 'sons of Mary' but of seafarers from Torre del Greco allowed themselves to be held in check for a few days by four people, and the Captain then, talking to Craxi on the phone said, 'nothing happened,' when in fact a person had been killed? On this you who are historians can give clarification with a whole cultural apparatus that I do not have, I am an empiricist, maybe you can help me understand now for then." Di Nolfo, Ennio, ed. (2007). La politica estera italiana negli anni ottanta [Italian foreign policy in the 1980s] (PDF) (in Italian). Venice: Marsilio. ISBN 978-88-317-9277-6. Archived from the original (PDF) on 11 December 2015.) confirmed that all passengers were unharmed.

Therefore, despite the new American opposition, the safe conduct – which obviously also pertained to those who were believed to be mere negotiators (Note: "For us, Abbas was the trustee of the organization that saved us." ""Lo rifarei fuggire, era l' uomo che ci aveva salvato"" ["I would make him run away again, he was the man who saved us"]. Corriere Della Sera (in Italian). 17 April 2003. Archived from the original on 31 October 2015. This is also confirmed by Admiral Martini: "Mr. Craxi and Mr. Andreotti, who had handled the Achille Lauro issue on the level of international relations, had in all evidence guaranteed the lives and freedom of the two Palestinian negotiators appointed by Arafat and Mubarak and accepted by the Italian government. Thus, relations with Arab heads of state were at stake.": see Di Nolfo, Ennio, ed. (2007). La politica estera italiana negli anni ottanta [Italian foreign policy in the 1980s] (PDF) (in Italian). Venice: Marsilio. p. 125. ISBN 978-88-317-9277-6. Archived from the original (PDF) on 11 December 2015.) – was signed by Ambassador Migliuolo and the ship was freed. The U.S. administration, through spokesman Charles Redman, officially distanced itself from the Italian mediation, but did not feel it produced any evidence to the contrary of the genuine nature of the intermediation: (Note: Ian Black, Benny Morris, Mossad, BUR, state that Israeli intelligence chief Ehud Barak had as early as October 9 intercepts confirming the relationship between Abbas and the hijackers, and had transmitted the contents to the U.S. alone (which would keep the contents and source secret for more than a week before belatedly transmitting them to Rome); in reality, however, according to the aforementioned authors at least in one case the friendly tone of the relations between Abbas and the hijackers emerged from a conversation that took place in public, from the Port Said harbor master's office, whereby some of the journalists present would have been able to forewarn the intelligence services of the powers concerned. According to Antonio Badini ("The Choice of a Statesman", in Mondoperaio, 11-12/2015, pp. 24–26), however, already on Friday night "there was artful talk of heavy evidence of Abu Abbas's role as the instigator," but "fortunately that move was effectively counterbalanced by the excellent interception work carried out in the circumstance by the Italian Navy ships, sent at our request to the area as soon as the news of the hijacking of the Achille Lauro was learned. In fact, the meticulous examination of the two transcripts, the one from an Israeli source and the one from our Navy source, had enabled us to make the judges later called to judge on the extradition request, which we will discuss later, find that nothing in the recordings corroborated a role of principal by Abu Abbas.") Washington, D.C. rather overshadowed the fact that a crime had been committed on board, (Note: October 9, 2 a.m. U.S. Ambassador to Rome Maxwell Rabb returns to Palazzo Chigi and in an interview with Craxi reveals that some wiretaps confirm the murder of the passenger: "Achille Lauro". colmoschin.it. Archived from the original on 24 November 2015. It involves the receipt, at 4 p.m. the day before, of a statement from a Lebanese radio amateur who claimed to have picked up a communication between Achille Lauro and Lebanese authorities stating that they had killed a man.) but the statement made by De Rosa induced the Italian and Egyptian authorities to rule it out.

Achille Lauro set course for Egypt and docked at Port Said: at 3:30 p.m. October 10. The ship was clear, although passengers still could not disembark. However, it was not until later in the evening that independent confirmation of the crime could be obtained: Ambassador Migliuolo had come aboard and in the presence of Egyptian officials (Note: Lannutti, Giancarlo. "L'Egitto si tiene cauto solo una «deploraione»" [Egypt remains cautious only one "regret"]. L'Unità OGGI (in Italian). Archived from the original on 4 March 2016. : the circumstance was opposed by the Egyptians when they tried to argue that – prior October 11, when in a "supplementary investigation" unequivocal confirmations were acquired from the passengers, who finally got off the ship – they had no other element than the statements made by De Rosa under threat from the terrorists, on board the ship. In any case, the final tragic confirmation came when the body was recovered at sea several days later, between October 14 and 15, off Syrian territorial waters.) began to hear from the captain what had happened. Craxi learned directly of the circumstance by speaking with Commander De Rosa in a telephone conversation, "a few minutes before the press conference. Craxi told us to alert our ambassador Migliuolo immediately, instructing him to prepare the ground for our request for extradition for the four hijackers, since the safe-conduct was conditional on the absence of any bloodshed that had occurred on the ship. De Rosa, certainly for the sake of quiet, had regrettably kept quiet about Klinghofer's murder in previous phone calls with the Foreign Ministry and the Services. Even before he went to the press conference, Craxi also instructed us to inform the Farnesina of our conversation with Migliuolo and to request that the procedures, in agreement with the Ministry of Justice, for the extradition of the four hijackers be initiated as a matter of urgency, a request that he would support directly with President Mubarak."

The Egyptian government decided to make an immediate transfer to Tunisia, where the PLO was based at the time. Despite the assurances publicly offered on the morning of October 10 by Egyptian head of state Hosni Mubarak – who declared that the terrorists had already left Egypt – the White House declared that the Egyptian president's statements contradicted those it had received from its own sources. A little later, an official who was on Reagan's plane en route to Chicago informed that the four were still at an airport in Al Masa.

It was not until the afternoon of October 10 that a civilian aircraft, a Boeing 737 of the Egyptian Airlines, was requisitioned by the Cairo government and officially became a state transport; in the evening, along with the four hijackers of the motor ship and the PLO representatives (i.e., Abu Abbas and Hani el Hassan) (Note: According to U.S. sources there was a third Palestinian, Ozzuddin Badrakkan, who had not physically participated in the hijacking but had boarded the Egyptian plane: cf. Michael K. Bohn, The Achille Lauro hijacking: lessons in the politics and prejudice of terrorism, Brassey, 2004, p. 86.) an Egyptian ambassador and some Egyptian security service agents also boarded the plane. The flight took off at 11:15 p.m. (Cairo time).

== The night of October 10/11 ==
=== The interception of the Boeing ===
U.S. President Reagan, while flying from Chicago to Washington, decided to accept the proposal of the U.S. National Security Council by arranging to unilaterally intercept (Note: Absolutely at odds with all historiographical sources is the following version of events: "respecting diplomatic protocol, Ronald Reagan telephoned Italian Prime Minister Bettino Craxi only minutes before landing at Sigonella to inform him of the operation." (James J. F. Forest, Countering terrorism and insurgency in the 21st century, Greenwood, 2007, Volume 3, p. 60): as will be seen, neither the hijacking nor the request to land at Sigonella were the subject of direct talks between the two presidents, who intervened only after the fact.) the plane using the information relayed by Israel: four F-14 Tomcat fighter aircraft took off from the aircraft carrier USS Saratoga and flew alongside the plane just over Malta.

Meanwhile, the National Security Council and the U.S. State Department succeeded in limiting the Egyptian plane's landing options by asking the governments of Tunisia, Greece and Lebanon not to allow it to land at their airports. When the Egyptair flight was now approaching its destination, Tunis communicated its refusal to authorize the landing. Authorization was then requested from the Boeing to Athens, from where they received another refusal.

The U.S. military then swung into action, radioing the Boeing and executing the intercept procedure, signalling with wing movements to follow them.

=== Italy-US military confrontation on the runway at Sigonella ===
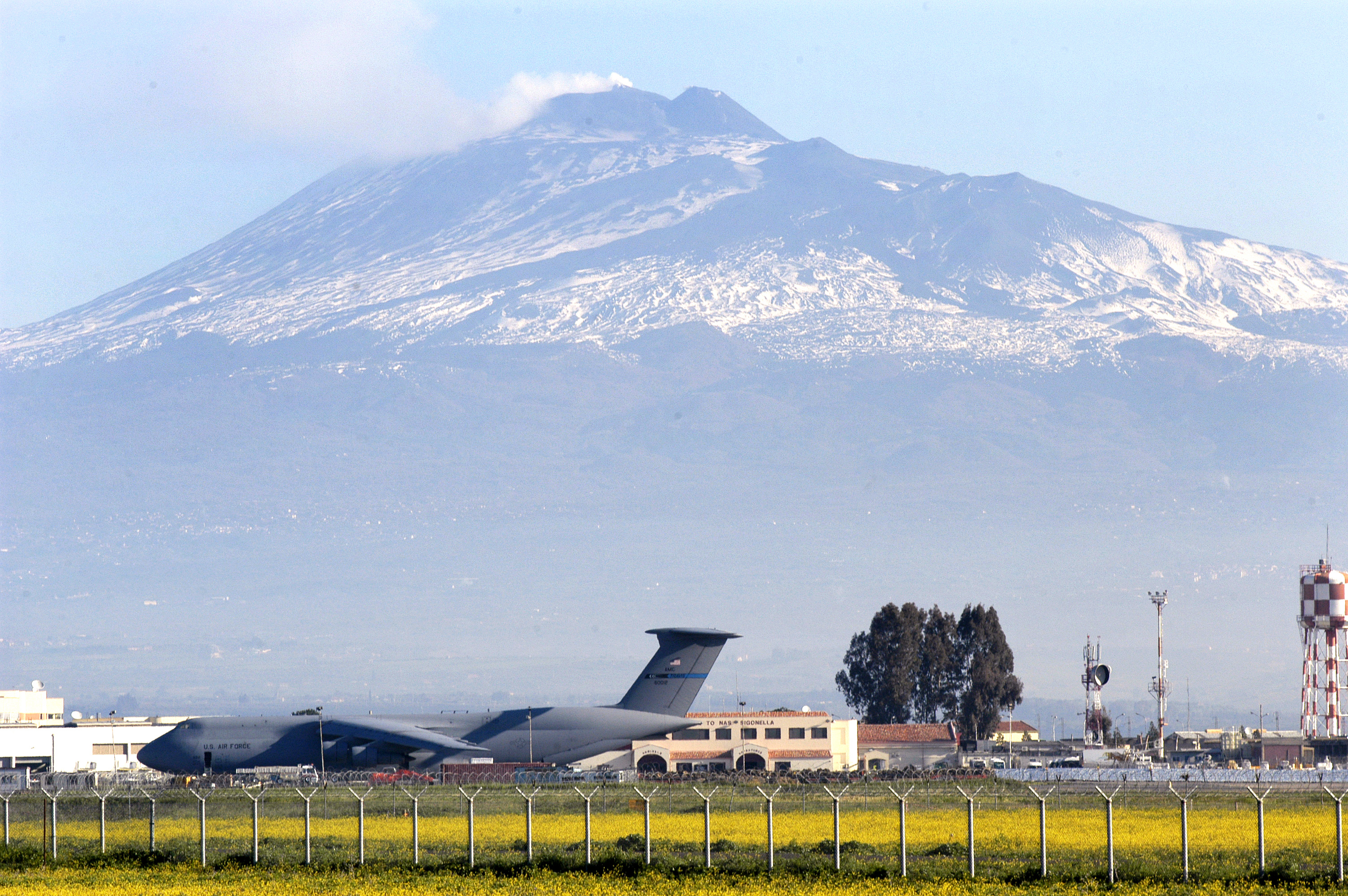
Sigonella military airport, with Mount Etna in the background

Without prior warning, U.S. fighters diverted the Egyptian plane to Sigonella Air Base in Sicily, an Italian military airport that includes a U.S. Navy naval air station (NAS). Around 10:30pm, Air Force Colonel Ercolano Annicchiarico, who was to relinquish command of the military airport to Colonel Carlo Lanzilli the next morning, was alerted to the arrival of an American formation. The request, denied, came from the Tomcats, 240 kilometres (150 mi) from the Sicilian airfield, and pertained only to the four F-14s and the Egyptian plane, no mention being made of the two C-141 Starlifters, neither authorized nor expected. (Note: "Having interrupted the farewell dinner, Annicchiarico ran to the airport, where the officer on duty explained that he had noticed strange American movements. To find out more, he had gone to the radar room, where, unlike when there was no U.S. air traffic, he had found American operators. This had prompted him to alert the Air Force Vigilance Alert Platoon (VAM)." Alegi, Di Gregory (10 August 2015). "Sigonella, trent'anni dalla crisi". Formiche. Archived from the original on 14 March 2022.)

Only when the hijacking had begun did the U.S. government attempt to contact Craxi. The U.S. version is that Craxi did not respond to telephone contact requests and that it was only for this reason that Oliver North turned to Michael Ledeen, a Central Intelligence Agency (CIA) consultant who managed to get through to Craxi (Note: Deborah Hart Strober, Gerald S. Strober,The Reagan presidency: an oral history of the era, p. 378: Ledeen boasted to his people that he knew the telephone number of the Italian prime minister's mistress, but he actually called the Raphael Hotel, Craxi's Roman residence, and this is how he recalls what happened: "I talked to Craxi's assistant ... I never remember the name ... Brandini, and he all that evening told all the Americans that Craxi was not there, so I talking to Brandini told him, 'Look it's me, if you say Craxi is not there while maybe he is in the next room you will find your photograph in the newspapers all over the world.' At that moment he passed it to me." According to Giuseppe Sacco, editor-in-chief of the European journal of International affairs, even in the reconstruction of the approach with Craxi's secretary, Cornelio Brandini, Ledeen's version would have been lacking in credibility (he told him that if he did not pass him the boss on the phone, his name would be in newspapers all over the world the next day: "imagine if this could be experienced as a threat, by Cornelio...": see Sacco's intervention, Sigonella. Una riflessione trent'anni dopo [Sigonella. A reflection thirty years later]. Radio Radicale (in Italian). Convention of the Socialism Association and Mondoperaio in Rome, Palazzo Giustiniani. 16 October 2015. Event occurs at 1:52:46. Archived from the original on 17 October 2015.) because of old customary relationships dating back to his time as an Italian university graduate student. Opposite is the version of Craxi's associates: "Craxi did not have much sympathy for him, he said, 'I don't see why I should talk to you, since there are other qualified people, such as Ambassador Rabb'; he did not want to attribute to Ledeen the role of spokesman for President Reagan."

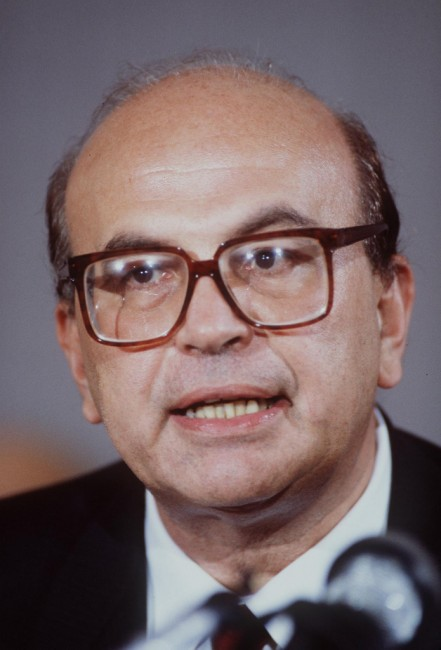
Italian Prime Minister Bettino Craxi

In any case, the telephone conversation eventually took place: according to Ledeen, Craxi only asked him "why in Italy?" (Note: In the abstract, there would have been, as alternatives, the islands of Crete and Cyprus (in the latter with the British military base at Akrotiri): see Gennaro Acquaviva, La trappola contro Craxi, Mondoperaio, 11-12/2015, p. 23.) and was satisfied with his answer, "for your perfect climate, your fabulous cuisine and the cultural traditions that Sicily can offer." The Italian Prime Minister, annoyed by this improvisation, intended to allow the landing, but only on the condition that he would handle the consequences independently. He issued precise directives that the terrorists be taken over by the Italian authorities, and secretly ordered the military leadership that the terrorists and the mediators be placed under Italian control. Admiral Fulvio Martini, head of the Military Intelligence Service (SISMI), at 11:57 p.m. received a telephone call from Craxi and on his order first gave the order to authorize the landing of the 5 aircraft known to them, from the control room of the Air Force General Staff in Rome; then he immediately went to the base at Sigonella.

The Italian Command's authorization for the landing of the Egyptian flight (Note: "Apparently because Craxi's permit had not yet reached Sicily," according to Michael K. Bohn The Achille Lauro hijacking: lessons in the politics and prejudice of terrorism, Brassey, 2004, p. 32.) came only when the aircraft had already declared a fuel emergency and it appeared clear that it would not be able to physically proceed to Catania-Fontanarossa Airport. The landing took place at 00:15. The tower controller and his assistant, without receiving orders to do so, instructed the Egyptian aircraft on their own initiative to park on the east side yard (Italian zone). Both the tower controller and his assistant were unaware as to the identity of the passengers on board the Egyptian aircraft: they were, however, the first to notice that in radio silence and with headlights off the five known aircraft were being followed by the two C-141s; in the absence of information, on their own responsibility and at their own risk, they made the above decision as to where to relocate the aircraft, which proved decisive for subsequent developments. The controller on duty and his assistant were the first two Italian people at Sigonella to realize that the Americans wanted to land the civilian plane on the runway of the military base, and then have it stop in the sector of the air terminal run by the U.S. Navy: they then forewarned both the Carabinieri and the VAM (Vigilanza Aeronautica Militare), the airport's guard force, of the landing.

Immediately 30 VAM airmen and 20 Carabinieri, stationed at Sigonella airport, converged on the runway, surrounding the plane, as per orders received. A few minutes later, two American C-141 Starlifters of the Delta Force under the command of United States Air Force Brigadier General Carl W. Stiner (Note: Sometimes transcribed as Steiner.) also landed – with lights out and without permission from the control tower: they headed toward the Egyptian Boeing and it was immediately clear (Note: For James J. F. Forest, Countering terrorism and insurgency in the 21st century, Greenwood, 2007, Volume 3, p. 60, the Americans were the first to converge two trucks on the runway, placing them in front of and behind the Egyptian plane.) their intent to pick up hijackers and Abu Abbas, according to orders received from Washington; the runway lights were immediately turned off. Tensions rose when the Delta Force raiders, descending from their C-141s guns drawn, surrounded the Italian airmen and Carabinieri at the base, but they in turn were surrounded at gunpoint by a second cordon of Carabinieri, who had meanwhile arrived from the nearby barracks in Catania and Syracuse. Captain Marzo received orders from the control tower to park a tanker truck, a crane and the fire-fighting vehicles locked and planted in front of the aircraft to permanently prevent them from moving from the base. Everyone stood to their positions: at that moment there were three concentric circles around the aircraft. There followed minutes of extremely high tension. (Note: "No big words were exchanged, if anything, only firm words" the Prime Minister declared to Mixer some time later: "Sigonella '85: La notte in cui la vam tenne la posizione" (in Italian). 8 October 2018. Archived from the original on 12 October 2019.)

Stiner – who had news from the United States in real time through satellite equipment – warned Commander Annicchiarico that he was in contact with the Oval Office of the White House and declared, "The Italian government has promised to hand over the Palestinians to us; I don't understand the resistance of you military men." Admiral Martini, director of SISMI, albeit with difficulty, (Note: He recalls that he relied on the SIP telephone network and that contacts between Rome and Sicily were made from the telephones of the Galleria Colonna, for fear of interception by the Allied government: even Craxi used a public booth. Cf. F. Martini, Nome in codice: Ulisse – Trent'anni di storia italiana nelle memorie di un protagonista dei servizi segreti, Rizzoli.) heard from Rome and had Stiner reply, "We have instructions to leave them there." The Italian authorities remained adherent to the line that, in the absence of an extradition request, no one was allowed to take from Italian justice persons suspected of having taken part in a criminal act punishable under Italian law.

The case had been entrusted to the Syracuse prosecutor's office, since the event was occurring on its territory of jurisdiction, as Andreotti told Schultz by telephone: therefore, among the protagonists of that night was prosecutor Roberto Pennisi, at that time deputy prosecutor on duty at the Aretusean court. He was in charge of taking the four terrorists into custody and interrogating them.

From Washington came immediate intimations addressed through diplomatic-military channels to the leadership of the Italian government: the Americans merely presented the matter as an international police operation, disregarding the different priorities imposed by the Italian legal system. Having failed to get a positive response, (Note: According to Andreotti, the management of the affair was centralized from that moment in the supreme political leaderships of the two countries, "Schultz phoned me. But Prime Minister Craxi spoke directly with Reagan. I remember that Michael Ledeen acted as his interpreter. At the time, he had a role as a diplomatic adviser to the services. I told Schultz that the problem was in the hands of the Syracuse prosecutor's office. We could not stop people without the authorization of the magistrates. And the prosecutor's office had issued an arrest order only for the four terrorists. At that time, Abu Abbas was a man who had provided his good offices, period" (That was a perfidious terrorist but we did the right thing, Repubblica – April 17, 2003, p. 8).) U.S. President Reagan, infuriated by Italian behavior, decided to phone Prime Minister Craxi in the middle of the night to demand the surrender of the terrorists; however, Craxi did not budge from his positions: the crimes had been committed aboard an Italian ship, therefore on Italian territory, (Note: The legal correctness of the Italian position was supported by both Italian international doctrine (Antonio Cassese, Terrorism, politics and the law: the Achille Lauro affair, Princeton, 1989) and Anglo-Saxon doctrine (Christopher T. Sandars, America's overseas garrisons: the leasehold empire, Oxford, 2000, p. 234).) and it would be Italy's Justice decision whether and whom to extradite. (Note: According to Michael Ledeen – who claims to have acted as interpreter on the call – the tones of the conversations were never very tense. Reagan explained that a formal extradition request was being prepared, that there was an arrest warrant, and names were listed, one by one, of the wanted men, including Abbas. Craxi would initially give "a basically affirmative answer to our requests," but in the meantime did nothing to change the situation on the ground.)

At 5:30 a.m. on October 11, when the commanding general of the Carabinieri, Riccardo Bisogniero called in at Sigonella (on Craxi's orders) the military's armored cars and other reinforcement units, the U.S. special unit was ordered to return. Reagan, faced with the Italian position, had only to give in and withdraw these military personnel from Sigonella, (Note: Cf. "La Repubblica/Esteri: Sigonella 1985: "Così fermammo gli Usa"". Archived from the original on 2020-02-02.. According to James J. F. Forest, Countering terrorism and insurgency in the 21st century, Greenwood, 2007, Volume 3, p. 61, however, Reagan's decision to order U.S. troops "to stand down" came within three hours of landing.) trusting in the voluntary implementation of the promises he believed he had obtained during the telephone call with Craxi. (Note: Probably also had a bearing on the time frame prospected to Reagan, which at the time appeared more relaxed than it later turned out to be: according to Giulio Andreotti, "To Reagan's question, whether it was possible to wait a few days to then do the paperwork that would make it possible to keep them prisoners, Bettino had probably said yes, because put like that, the question had a general character. I had been more cautious because he had also phoned me and I had answered that it was a problem that did not concern us. If the magistrates authorized us to stop them, we then had to deal with the political consequences, but first there was also a legal problem, so much so that in the morning Bettino went to Milan, we discussed the situation with Amato and the plane then left" (Giulio Andreotti in Italian Foreign Policy in the 1980s, p. 118, consulted at URL http://www.fondazionesocialismo.it/Convegni_Craxi/La%20politica%20estera.pdf ).)

== October 11: Italy–United States diplomatic clash ==
Of the Reagan-Craxi conversation as early as the next day, two conflicting versions were circulating, regarding the number of those to be detained and their fate: for the Italian ambassador in Washington, "speaking by telephone with Antonio Badini and Renato Ruggiero, they clarified to me that we actually made a clear distinction between the four and the two. The latter in fact were not responsible for the hijacking, but had collaborated to obtain the surrender of the hijackers and the release of the hostages. Craxi, in his conversation with Reagan, had made the distinction. The four would be prosecuted, while the two would be detained only for investigation. I pointed out to my two interlocutors that, according to the Americans, Craxi had promised instead to try all six, and that we would risk provoking a serious crisis if we let Abu Abbas go." Totally eccentric, then, was the position of Michael Ledeen, who would later claim an unfaithful translation (Note: According to press reports at the time, however, the phone call between Craxi and Reagan had Thomas Longo Jr., head of the State Department's Italian desk, as interpreter: see Panorama, 1985, p. 59 e Mondo, 1985, p. 54) of the Reagan-Craxi conversation but still sticking to the number of four people covered by the telephone conversation.

The next morning Palazzo Chigi contacted the Egyptian ambassador in Rome, Rifaat, and informed him of the Italian government's intention to take the four hijackers into custody for judicial purposes and also to let two Palestinian leaders (including Abu Abbas) accompanying them off the plane, who would be treated as "guests for witness purposes." The Egyptians agreed to the first request, but not to the second, arguing that the two persons should be considered guests of the Egyptian government, which held itself responsible for their safety: since the two were in Italy against their will and refused to leave the plane, it was absolutely out of the question that they would be forced to do so. (Note: According to Andreotti (That was a treacherous terrorist but we did the right thing, Repubblica – April 17, 2003, p. 8) Cairo operated a kind of blackmail: "Let's not forget that the plane was Egyptian and the Egyptians were very clear. 'If you don't let the plane leave,' they told us, 'we won't let the Achille Lauro sail.'" Also for Ledeen (Corriere della Sera, April 18, 2003, p. 10 "Ledeen: but Andreotti is wrong, we didn't apologize to Craxi") the Egyptian leader Mubarak in those hours allegedly told the Italian government, "If you hand Abbas over to the Americans, they will kill me"; in this interview by Michael Ledeen with Gianluca Di Feo, one reads, "I think this was the main reason for choosing to let him escape: respect for the Egyptians and for the PLO.")

The suspicion that things were not evolving as agreed began to grow in Washington that same morning, if it is true that the Secretary of State thought to specify in writing in a telegram to the U.S. ambassador in Rome, Maxwell Rabb, the content of his version of events: "The president proposed to Craxi that an urgent request for extradition be forwarded, and Craxi said that this would be a good solution because he will be able to place the matter in the hands of the competent Italian bodies, the courts," Shultz wrote in the telegram, adding that Craxi assured that "Italy in the meantime will imprison the terrorists pending legal developments." "It has been agreed that the request for extradition will relate to the four hijackers of the Achille Lauro and that Italy (with American assistance) will formulate charges against the other two in order to try them," Shultz stresses, specifying that "Craxi has agreed to detain all six – I repeat six – Palestinians and the president expects the Italian government to do so."

Meanwhile, in Sicily, under the supervision of four U.S. officers (and five military radio liaison officers), the handing over of the four terrorists to Prosecutor Pennisi for questioning took place: they, who were in the Syracuse prison, were brought before the judiciary of the city. However, even before the interrogation began, pressure continued for the plane with Abu Abbas inside to be allowed to take off. Pennisi opposed the takeoff, as he himself recounts in his diary:

"Someone asked him a quick and hasty question that he dismissed with a flat no! It was the communication of the Egyptian diplomat's request, about the possibility of letting the plane leave. [...] "No," he said dryly. He was in the office of the Carabinieri station. Directly he followed the movements of the senior officer to whom he had shouted that no. He saw that he was talking to someone, then picked up the phone, dialed a number, and, with deference, said, "He doesn't want to!""

Prosecutor Pennisi, who was in charge of the investigation during those hours, then opposed their departure, saying he was sure of Abu Abbas' guilt, but the indisputable order came to let the plane take off and the case finally passed to the Genoa magistracy, which validated the detention, also contemplating the crime of murder.

Craxi's diplomatic adviser Badini places his conversation "with Abu Abbas on the Egyptair plane at a stopover in Sigonella" (Note: Of which "we set apart with Acquaviva Minister Martinazzoli's chief of staff, Zhara Buda, who led the judges meeting at Palazzo Chigi." (Antonio Badini, La scelta di uno statista, in Mondoperaio, 11-12/2015, pp. 24–26).) in these hours: he, therefore, reported to Rome, in particular, that Abu Abbas had confirmed in the aforementioned interview that "the objective of his men was to land in Ashdod to carry out an attack, while of Klinghofer's killing he had firmly stated that he learned of it only at the landing of his four militiamen, reiterating that it was completely unrelated to the PLO's objectives. Thus, the American argument neither for the forced transfer of Abu Abbas to the United States nor for his surrender by the Italian government was not tenable." (Note: Antonio Badini, La scelta di uno statista, in Mondoperaio, 11-12/2015, pp. 24–26: hence he justifies the rejection of the extradition request, which is, moreover, deliberated "after three hours of careful examination carried out by magistrates convened for the purpose" at Palazzo Chigi.) At that moment, in Port Said the crew and passengers of Achille Lauro – finally disembarked from the ship – were making statements about their odyssey, and the press was consequently spreading the news that the first rumors of Klinghoffer's death were true, which would later be confirmed by the discovery of his body at sea.

The plane's captain and Egyptian diplomat Zeid Imad Hamed boarded the Boeing, which took off for Rome in the evening.

That flight was also at the center of an international case, especially after Craxi revealed some of its details in Parliament. To get the full picture, however, one had to wait for the description given by the SISMI commander at the time, Admiral Martini: "From a secondary taxiway, with the lights off, an American F-14 fighter of the Sixth Fleet took off from Sigonella. It had not requested takeoff clearance, nor had it submitted, according to regulations, a flight plan. The F-14 attempted to interfere with the flight of our formation, once again trying to hijack the Egyptian plane to take control of it. Our fighters deterred and repelled it."

== October 12: the follow-up in Rome ==
The Boeing landed at Ciampino Airport shortly before midnight between October 11 and October 12, 1985. An unidentified plane – which had followed it with its lights off, refusing to identify itself to the Italian continental control towers during the journey, which had followed alongside the Egyptian Boeing and flown low just a few meters above homes to escape radar – requested a landing, which the control tower refused. The plane then declared a (fuel) emergency, turned off its radio and landed, and went to park not far from the Boeing. It was a U.S. North American T-39 Sabreliner, a military jet capable of carrying up to seven passengers. On board was a Delta Force commando and General Carl Stiner, then head of United States Special Operations Command, who with the two C-141s had diverted the Boeing to Sigonella.

As the sun rose, a visit by U.S. Ambassador to Rome, Maxwell Rabb, took place at the home of the chief of staff of the Minister of Justice, Salvatore Zhara Buda. (Note: At 5:30 a.m., at Zhara Buda's home, according to Gianfranco Piazzesi, The Game of Politics, Longanesi, 1986, page 236, an embassy counselor named John Holmes showed up. Insists on the presence of Rabb L'Espresso, 1987, nn. 39/42, p. 52 and The First War on Terrorism: Counter-terrorism Policy by David C. Wills – 2004.) The embassy thereby handed over a copy of the international arrest warrant issued in the night by Federal District Court Judge Charles Richey against the hijackers and Abbas on charges of piracy, corroborated by evidence finally released by the Israeli embassy in Washington.

Egyptian Ambassador Rifaat, on the other hand, informed the Farnesina that the ten armed guards aboard the Boeing had been ordered to defend the inviolability of the plane by all means. The passengers disembarked from the Boeing only when two cars with diplomatic license plates picked them up and departed immediately bound for the Egyptian Academy. According to one version, the two PLO leaders would be among them. According to another version, the two would remain on board the Boeing: this version was confirmed more than two decades later by the head of the Egyptian Academy in Rome, Farouk Hosni, whose role was instrumental in the continuation of the affair. (Note: Corriere della sera, September 22, 2009: "Instead, the Secret Service had left the three Palestinians on board the plane and I was asked to stall until the end of the day with the prosecutor, who demanded that I hand over the passports (of the passengers housed in the academy)"; cf. "Hosni ammette: «Aiutai i dirottatori» e l'Unesco sceglie la bulgara Bokova - Corriere della Sera". Archived from the original on 2009-09-25.)

From the Syracuse prosecutor's office departed a request to the Rome prosecutor's office to obtain direct statements from Abu Abbas. Rome's chief prosecutor assigned the task to Deputy Prosecutor Franco Ionta. The latter called Digos and was informed that the passengers of the Boeing were at the Egyptian Academy; then at 1:30 p.m. he went to the Egyptian Academy accompanied by a Digos official, but was told that no one was there and – given the rank of office with diplomatic immunity – the PM agreed to return after 5 p.m.

By 1pm, an expert opinion from the Ministry of Justice had meanwhile been delivered to Palazzo Chigi. (Note: Badini refers to it to support the full legality of Craxi's decisions: "in the wiretaps, carefully read by magistrates, there was an unambiguous order from Abbas to the four not to carry out violent actions and to desist from the kidnapping, handing themselves over unconditionally to the Egyptian authorities in Port Said. A plausible circumstance, moreover, since the entry of the four stowaways aboard the Achille Lauro from the outset was explained by Abbas to Arafat, and by the latter to Craxi, as due to the accomplishment of an attack in Ashdod. Such action was certainly deplorable, because it was in any case intended to damage the image and credibility not only of Arafat but of the Italian government itself: yet it did not constitute for the case any evidence in favor of the extradition request" (Antonio Badini, La scelta di uno statista, in Mondoperaio, 11-12/2015, p. 24-26).) It was signed by Minister of Grace and Justice Mino Martinazzoli and stated, "The ministry considers that the request for provisional arrest does not contain substantial elements according to the criteria that Italian law establishes for the acquisition of evidence and the judgment on its evidence." The contents of the Ministry of Justice document were communicated in a verbal note to U.S. Ambassador Rabb. The ambassador declared that he could not agree with the conclusions of the Italian judiciary, and announced additional documentation that would prove the complicity in the hijacking also of the PLO leaders who joined the terrorists in the Boeing after the surrender in Port Said.

Craxi telephoned Minister Spadolini and informed him of Martinazzoli's decision; he received his request that any decision be subject to a collegial cabinet decision, a request that would not be granted. While U.S. Ambassador Rabb sent Palazzo Chigi the previously announced supplementary documentation (a list, from an Israeli source, of terrorist attacks in which Abbas was suspected of having played a role) and a message from Reagan asking Craxi to exercise all his authority to detain the Palestinian leader, Spadolini called Undersecretary Amato, announcing to him his intention to request a collegial cabinet consultation on the decision regarding Abbas.

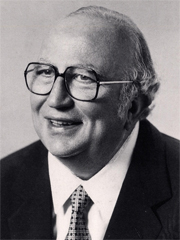
Italian Defense Minister Giovanni Spadolini

At 2:45 p.m. Andreotti and Craxi agreed that, owing to Martinazzoli's advice, the Boeing aircraft could leave; Spadolini would later complain that – unlike Ambassadors Rabb and Rifaat – he was not informed of the Italian government's decision, but Ambassador Petrignani would later deny this version. (Note: "Early in the morning of Saturday the 12th I received a phone call from Minister Spadolini, who informed me in a tone of great concern that the decision to free Abu Abbas and the other Palestinian had already been taken, and would soon be communicated to Ambassador Rabb. The decision," he told me, "had been taken by Craxi and Andreotti without consulting the government. He did not agree with it.": Rinaldo Petrignani, in Italian Foreign Policy in the 1980s, p. 136, consulted at URL http://www.fondazionesocialismo.it/Convegni_Craxi/La%20politica%20estera.pdf) As part of what Hosni calls the "diversionary plan" implemented by the Egyptian intelligence services there were two dangers to be evaded: the U.S. one and the judicial one. At 4 p.m. Rifaat went to Palazzo Chigi and there, from Amato's office, he telephoned Cairo.

Shortly thereafter came a call from Mubarak saying that he feared a new U.S. wiretap and therefore did not authorize the Boeing's departure; everything suggests that this exchange of conversations was aimed at letting possible interceptors believe that the targets of U.S. interest (i.e., the two PLO leaders, including Abu Abbas) were together with the Egyptian group of agents from the Egyptian Academy. The plan went so far as to involve the Ministry of Defence, which was suspected of being "monitored" by the Americans, in the disinformation: at 5 p.m. Rifaat called, again from Giuliano Amato's office, Spadolini's deputy chief of staff, asking him for an air escort (possibly for a plane other than the Boeing to throw off any interceptors).

On the judicial side, too, the Egyptian claims ascribe to Cairo all the credit for the diversion to which the PM was forced: at 5 p.m. Ionta (Note: Subject to Hosny's criticism, "Then the Italian prosecutor came to me, who wanted to embarrass Egypt at all costs, and asked to question the (passengers) who were not Egyptians, but I replied that there were only Egyptian guests at the Academy." Corriere della Sera, loc. ult. cit.) reappeared at the academy, where he was told that the Boeing passengers had departed, but he was not told to where. However, Ionta learned from Digos that the passengers had gone to Ciampino. He then decided to travel to Ciampino. When he arrived there he learned that the plane had meanwhile moved to Fiumicino. At about 5:45 pm, Egyptian Ambassador Rifaat and the head of the PLO's Rome office, Fuad Bitar, informed Amato that they had decided that Abbas and his companion (Note: The only discrepancy in Hosni's version, compared to the official version, is that according to him there were three non-Egyptian passengers, not two, since the Academy "gave orders to prepare 17 rooms, while only 14 people arrived." Corriere della Sera, loc. ult. cit.) would board a Yugoslav Airlines flight bound for Belgrade, which was supposed to take off from Fiumicino at 5:30 p.m.

Meanwhile, the Egyptian embassy obtained Belgrade's consent and blocked the Yugoslav flight when it was about to take off. At 6:00 pm. Palazzo Chigi warned the police commissioner in Rome, Monarca, to take all measures to ensure that the transshipment from the Boeing to the airliner took place without incident. (Note: These modalities made Domenico Cacopardo, Spadolini opposed to Sigonella, ItaliaOggi, August 5, 2016, say that "If it had indeed been a 'diplomat,' the Italian government would have had no need to transfer him secretly (at night two planes side by side so that not even telephoto lenses could capture Abu Abbas' entry into the Yugoslav plane). (...) The manner in which the operation ended shows that Craxi (and Andreotti) was in a hurry to get rid of the important prisoner, so as not to be precisely forced to subject him to judicial investigations that could have revealed what kind of relations Italy had with the gang of cutthroats and blackmailers headed by Yasser Arafat." For the record, the transshipment took place late in the afternoon.) At 6:30 p.m. the Boeing left Ciampino and after 15 minutes landed at Fiumicino and parked a short distance from the Yugoslav airliner. Meanwhile, Rifaat had arrived at Fiumicino, who welcomed the two Palestinian leaders when they got off the Boeing and handed them passports with false identities.

Spadolini went to Andreotti and asked him if Abbas had already left. Andreotti replied that he did not know. Giovanni Spadolini called the Ministry of Defence where, however, they could not provide him with definite news. (Note: According to Domenico Cacopardo, Spadolini si oppose a Sigonella, ItaliaOggi, August 5, 2016, "the Carabinieri (...)-"In faithful centuries"-preferred to refer to Palazzo Chigi at Palazzo Baracchini (defense ministry) to handle the situation even without the consent of the defense minister.") At 7 pm. Spadolini and Andreotti, in the latter's office, learned from television that Abbas had left. At 7:15 pm. Ionta arrived at Fiumicino. Rabb, received at Palazzo Chigi by Craxi's diplomatic adviser, Ambassador Badini, delivered another message from Reagan asking to detain Abu Abbas. But by now, for both, it was too late.

Abu Abbas, moving with the explicit authorization of the Italian government to another runway, left on a Yugoslav airliner, managing to take refuge in Belgrade: his guilt, on the basis of the evidence that emerged, was not apparent at the time (although he would later be sentenced by the Genoa Tribunal to life imprisonment) and, in the face of U.S. protests, the diplomatic passport he possessed was invoked to guarantee his safety. (Note: Rinaldo Petrignani, in The Sigonella Crisis from the Washington Observatory, recalls that Craxi declared to Reagan, in the Washington meeting following the events, that "Abbas had never left the official plane where he was under armed escort. To capture him it would have been necessary to storm the plane: that is, to carry out an act of war against Egypt. We could not have done that without irreparably compromising our relations with that country, which occupies such an important position in the Mediterranean." Also for Admiral Martini, "Italy, true to its word to Mubarak and Arafat, and also according to certain principles of law, could not legally detain Abu Abbas, who was in possession of a diplomatic passport, and therefore let him go" (Fulvio Martini, La notte di Sigonella, ibid.).) However, only a few days later (on October 16) did the CIA hand over the complete texts of the wiretaps, carried out by U.S. means, which proved with certainty the responsibility of Abu Abbas, who was then tried in absentia and sentenced to life imprisonment.

Even the U.S. government's request for the extradition of the four hijackers was not granted by Minister of Grace and Justice Mino Martinazzoli, who deemed the needs of Italian justice to try the perpetrators of the hijacking as paramount. They would be sentenced to severe punishment on July 11, 1986, by the Genoa court, which sentenced Abu Abbas and two members of the commando to life in prison. Majed el Molqi, perpetrator of the killing of Leon Klinghoffer, was sentenced to 30 years in prison. The fourth terrorist, a minor, would be sentenced to 17 years in prison. On May 23, 1987, the Genoa Court of Appeals confirmed all convictions. In 1996 Majed al Moloqui did not return to prison after a furlough: he would be arrested in Spain and extradited.

== The rupture between Spadolini and Craxi and the resulting government crisis ==
After these events, the deep political rifts within the Pentapartite majority emerged. Spadolini, pro-American and pro-Israel, called for the resignation of the government: the Republican ministers on October 16 withdrew their delegation from the government, effectively triggering the crisis. At this point it was a clash between pro-Americans and pro-Palestinians (the latter had had in Craxi and Andreotti the major exponents), but the request to keep the issue within the majority alone was rejected by Craxi, who on the following Tuesday rejected De Mita's request for an extra-parliamentary crisis and obtained to go to Parliament to tell the country his reasons in handling the affair. (Note: Speech by Gennaro Acquaviva at the aforementioned conference on October 16, 2015, available at URL https://www.radioradicale.it/scheda/455971/sigonella-una-riflessione-trentanni-dopo see also http://www.avantionline.it/blog/admin/#.ViIHpkpoaK0) During the tense session of the House, after his statements of meticulous reconstruction of the affair, Craxi, surprisingly, also received the support of the Italian Communist Party, which, despite being in opposition, supported his handling of the Sigonella case.

There were two points that Craxi emphasized, in his speech and later on. First, Italy had said it was ready to intervene aboard Achille Lauro. It was an Italian ship, under the responsibility of the Italian state, which had accepted U.S. assistance in case of extreme need. Secondly, the Italian government immediately gave authorization for the U.S. plane to land at Sigonella (although the interception had not been an orthodox operation) as soon as it was deemed that it was the only way to bring the four people responsible for the hijacking to Italian justice. In his telephone conversation with Reagan, Craxi had assured the U.S. president that the other two Palestinians would also be held for investigation, despite the fact that during the early morning hours their whereabouts were still unknown. It had then been discovered that they were traveling on an official Egyptian plane, as guests of Mubarak, under the protection of ten armed guards. After the Syracuse magistrate had completed his findings, and declared that for him the plane and the other passengers, with the exception of the four hijackers, could depart, it had been possible with great difficulty to persuade the plane's commander to move from Sigonella to Rome. Meanwhile, on the American side, a request for Abbas's arrest was being made: at five o'clock on Saturday morning Ambassador Rabb had submitted the request to the Ministry of Justice, accompanied by the relevant evidence. This evidence was carefully examined, but found insufficient. By ten o'clock the Ministry had concluded that there was insufficient basis for arresting Abbas. The same conclusion had been reached by the magistrates, to whom the request had been submitted.

On November 6, the government obtained the confidence of the Chamber of Deputies, after a reply speech in which Craxi, far from backing down from the reasons he had argued for handling the Sigonella case, "relaunched" them with a controversial comparison between Arafat and Giuseppe Mazzini, which produced protests in the Chamber and criticism from the Republicans, but was applauded by the remainder of the majority and also by the Communist opposition as pro-Palestinian, while it was harshly contested by some but not all of MSI. (Note: Speaker of the House Nilde Jotti restored order in the chamber, shushing deputies Giorgio La Malfa and Filippo Berselli.) Internal opposition within the party, by then crushed on Westernist and pro-Israel positions (interpreting geopolitical reality in a strict division between West and East, considered pro-Communist), forced, on the initiative of Beppe Niccolai, the MSI Central Committee to issue a document of public support for Craxi in defense of violated national sovereignty.

The act also had a spillover in Italian constitutional law: precisely from the legal implications of the depredation (Note: The legal implications of the resistance posed by the U.S. military to the Italian carabinieri, on the Sigonella airstrip, were instead declared nonexistent by the Syracuse assistant prosecutor, Dolcino Favi: cf. JOHN TAGLIABUE, "SICILIANS WON'T PURSUE INQUIRY ON U.S. TROOPS", in New York Times, October 29, 1985, p. 12.) emerged the need to offer a shield to the Prime Minister in the case of criminally relevant events motivated by the raison d'état: it was eventually guaranteed (Note: Chamber of Deputies, Council for Authorizations – Minutes of Tuesday, July 28, 2009, speech by MP Maurizio Turco: "There had been, however, as many will remember, the Sigonella episode, which changed the rules of the game. On that occasion Prime Minister Craxi had decided on an internationally wrongful act: the release of some Palestinians accused by Israel of being terrorists. He does not know whether it was right or wrong: he acknowledges, however, that it was a political act, albeit one with criminal implications. The justification cause in Article 9, paragraph 3, of Constitutional Law No. 1 of 1989 therefore has this kind of act in mind.") with Constitutional Law No. 1 of 1989, which provides for special causes of justification whose recognition is the responsibility of Parliament.

== The resolution of the diplomatic crisis ==
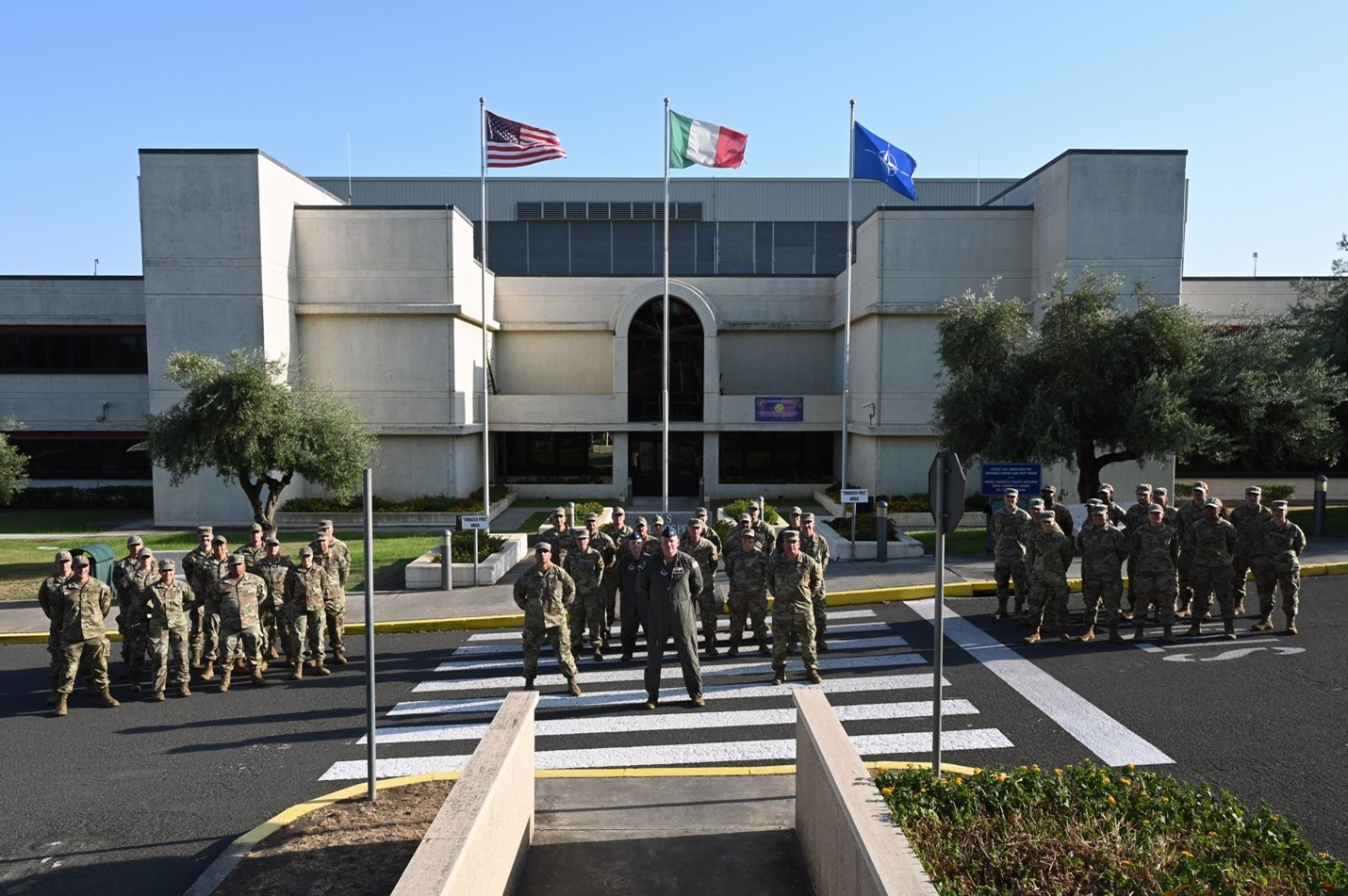
Italian and U.S. forces in Sigonella in 2024.

The affair successfully ended when Reagan wrote a letter to Craxi with the incipit "Dear Bettino" in which he invited the Prime Minister to travel to the United States, a trip canceled because of this affair. When the meeting actually took place, almost a month later, Craxi declared to Reagan that "he could not have done otherwise than he had done." He knew that by freeing Abu Abbas he would displease Reagan, but he had absolutely no choice in the situation in which he found himself.

Contributing to the resolution was the realization that the sympathetic attitude toward the Palestinian cause had not earned Italy immunity from terrorist acts, since less than two months later, the Fiumicino massacre took place. The result was a certain acquiescence to the Mediterranean policy that Reagan had long advocated in an aggressive sense with respect to Libyan claims on the Gulf of Sirte: in the spring of 1986, the then U.S. Secretary of State, George Shultz, wrote to President Reagan that "relations with Craxi were excellent," the Achille Lauro episode was now "a thing of the past," and that "on a confidential basis, Italy had allowed the use of Sigonella for support operations in connection with the exercise in the Gulf of Sirte." This did not, however, prevent Craxi from secretly informing Libyan dictator Gaddafi of Operation El Dorado Canyon when, that same spring, Reagan decided on it as an anti-Libyan retaliation for the bombing of the "La Belle" discotheque in West Berlin.

U.S. reactions had been very strong and appeared unfair to the Italian side. As Henry Kissinger commented to Italian Ambassador Rinaldo Petrignani, "We had to get mad, you had to set him free." (Note: Rinaldo Petrignani, in The Sigonella Crisis from the Washington Observatory: "Indeed, neither side had any other choice. The understandable American resentment at the release of an individual who was regarded as a dangerous terrorist was in fact countered, in addition to good legal and political reasons, by Italian resentment at the way the Americans had treated us.")

== See also ==
- Italian Air Force
- Naval Air Station Sigonella
- Giovanni Spadolini
- Giulio Andreotti
- First Craxi government
- Muhammad Zaidan

== Bibliography ==
- Acquaviva, Gennaro; Badini, Antonio (2010). La pagina saltata della Storia. Venezia: Marsilio.
- Fondazione Craxi, ed. (2015). La notte di Sigonella. Documenti e discorsi sull'evento che restituì orgoglio all'Italia. Milano: Mondadori.
- Nardini, Alessandra; Pennisi, Roberto (2009). Il mistero di Sigonella. Dal diario del Pubblico Ministero. 11 ottobre 1985. Milano: Giuffrè.
- Silj, Alessandro, ed. (1998). L'alleato scomodo. I rapporti fra Roma e Washington nel Mediterraneo: Sigonella e Gheddafi. Milano: Corbaccio.
