= The Death of Klinghoffer =

Opera by John Adams

- Opera by John Adams
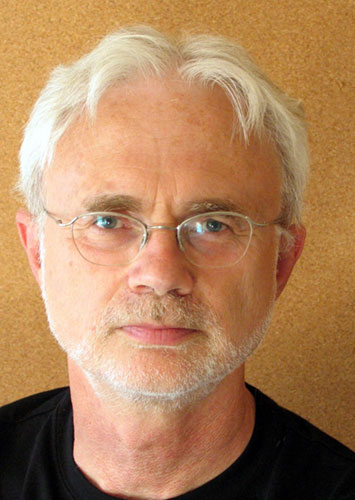
- Composer John Adams, 2008
- Librettist: Alice Goodman
- Language: English
- Premiere: 19 March 1991; La Monnaie, Brussels

The Death of Klinghoffer is an American opera, with music by John Adams to an English-language libretto by Alice Goodman. First produced in Brussels and New York in 1991, the opera is based on the hijacking of the passenger liner Achille Lauro by the Palestinian Liberation Front in 1985, and the hijackers' murder of a 69-year-old Jewish-American wheelchair-using passenger, Leon Klinghoffer.

The concept of the opera originated with theatre director Peter Sellars, who was a major collaborator, as was choreographer Mark Morris. It was commissioned by five American and European opera companies, and the Brooklyn Academy of Music.

The opera has generated controversy, including allegations by Klinghoffer's two daughters and others that the opera is antisemitic and glorifies terrorism. The work's creators and others have disputed these criticisms.

== Performance history ==
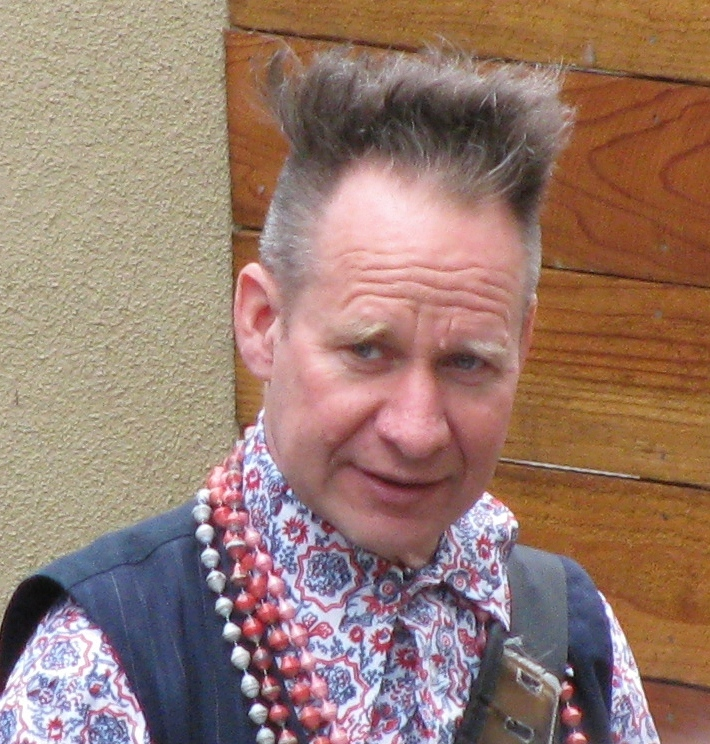
Peter Sellars, who originated the concept of the opera and directed its first performance

Theatre director Peter Sellars developed the concept of this opera and was a major collaborator, as was choreographer Mark Morris. The opera was originally commissioned through a consortium of six entities: the Brussels opera company La Monnaie, the San Francisco Opera, the Opéra de Lyon in France, the Los Angeles Festival (separate from that city's opera company), the Glyndebourne Festival in England, and the Brooklyn Academy of Music.

The first performance took place at the Théatre Royal de la Monnaie, Brussels, Belgium, on March 19, 1991, directed by Sellars. The next month, the Lyon premiere took place. This was followed by a Nonesuch studio recording in that French city with the same cast.

The first US performance was at the Brooklyn Academy of Music on September 5, 1991.

Controversy ensued. An opening scene depicting a suburban family, the Rumors, was permanently cut from the score on grounds that it caused offense due to antisemitic stereotypes. The Nonesuch recording, released in 1992, does not include this music. Because of the reaction to the subject matter and philosophy of the opera, planned stagings at Glyndebourne and in Los Angeles were cancelled.

When the original production was staged by San Francisco Opera in November 1992, the Jewish Information League mounted protests. The first staging in Germany took place in 1997 in Nürnberg, followed by a second German production at the Opernhaus Wuppertal in 2005.

Another European production was given in February 2001, in Helsinki at Finnish National Opera. The first complete UK performance was a 2002 concert in London by the BBC Symphony Orchestra. Penny Woolcock directed a British television version of the opera, in revised form, for Channel 4, with the London Symphony Orchestra conducted by Adams; its soundtrack was made in 2001, the telecast aired in 2003, and a DVD was released on Decca in 2004. The first Australasian performance took place in February 2005 at the Auckland Festival, New Zealand. The first fully staged UK production was given in August 2005 at the Edinburgh Festival by Scottish Opera.

The opera received a new production at the Brooklyn Academy of Music in December 2003. The Curtis Institute of Music, through its Curtis Opera Theatre and Curtis Symphony Orchestra, gave a performance in Philadelphia in February 2005. Four years later, students at the Juilliard Opera Center performed a semi-staged concert version with Adams conducting.

The Death of Klinghoffer received its second full American staging in June 2011 at Opera Theatre of Saint Louis, conducted by Michael Christie, directed by James Robinson, and starring Christopher Magiera as the Captain and Brian Mulligan as Klinghoffer. The opera received its first London production on February 25, 2012, starring Alan Opie as Klinghoffer and Christopher Magiera as the Captain, conducted by Baldur Brönnimann and staged by Tom Morris at the English National Opera, in a co-production with the Metropolitan Opera. In June 2014, the Met's general manager Peter Gelb announced that after discussions with the Anti-Defamation League the planned Live in HD transmission of the production would be cancelled. The opera was set for seven performances at the Met in October and November 2014 and performed as scheduled.

After being dropped from production by the Los Angeles Opera, the opera received its Los Angeles area premiere in March 2014 with Long Beach Opera, conducted by Andreas Mitisek and staged by James Robinson.

== Roles ==
Roles, voice types, premiere cast
Role	Voice type	Premiere cast, March 19, 1991 Conductor: Kent Nagano
The Captain	baritone	James Maddalena
The First Officer	bass-baritone	Thomas Hammons
Swiss Grandmother	mezzo-soprano	Janice Felty
Molqi	tenor	Thomas Young
Mamoud	baritone	Eugene Perry
Austrian Woman	mezzo-soprano	Janice Felty
Leon Klinghoffer	baritone	Sanford Sylvan
"Rambo"	bass-baritone	Thomas Hammons
British Dancing Girl	mezzo-soprano	Janice Felty
Omar	mezzo-soprano	Stephanie Friedman
Marilyn Klinghoffer	contralto	Sheila Nadler
Chorus, dancers

== Synopsis ==
=== Prologue ===
The prologue consists of two choruses, the "Chorus of Exiled Palestinians" and the "Chorus of Exiled Jews", each of which is a general reflection about the respective peoples and their history.

=== Act 1 ===
Scene 1

The unnamed captain of the MS Achille Lauro recalls the events of the hijacking. Prior to that, most of the passengers had disembarked in Egypt for a tour of the Pyramids, and the ship set out to sea to return later for the touring passengers. The hijackers had boarded during the disembarkation. When the hijackers commandeer the ship, the passengers still on board are collected in the ship's restaurant. The narrative shifts to a Swiss grandmother, traveling with her grandson while the boy's parents are touring the pyramids. The ship's first officer, given the fictitious name of Giordano Bruno, informs the Captain that terrorists are on the ship and one waiter has been wounded. The Captain and First Officer try to keep the passengers calm. Molqi, one of the hijackers, explains the situation to the passengers at gunpoint. The Captain and Molqi have an encounter, where the Captain orders food and drink to be brought, and offers to let Molqi choose the food for the Captain to eat.

Scene 2

Following the "Ocean Chorus", another hijacker, Mamoud, keeps guard over the Captain. Mamoud recalls his youth and songs he listened to on the radio. The Captain and Mamoud have a dialogue, in which the Captain pleads that individuals on the two sides of the Palestinian–Israeli conflict could meet and try to understand each other. Mamoud dismisses this idea. During this scene is a passenger narrative by the Austrian Woman, who locked herself in her cabin and remained hidden throughout the hijacking. Act 1 ends with the "Night Chorus."

=== Act 2 ===
The "Hagar Chorus", relating to the Islamic story of Hagar and the Angel and the Biblical story of Hagar and Ishmael is sung. It represents the beginnings of Arab–Israeli tension, of which the hijacking is one historical result.

Scene 1

Molqi is frustrated that he has received no reply to his demands. Mamoud threatens all of the passengers with death. Leon Klinghoffer sings, saying that he normally likes to avoid trouble and live simply and decently, but going on to denounce the hijackers. Another hijacker, called "Rambo", responds in harsh terms about Jews and Americans. The passenger, the British Dancing Girl, recalls how well the fourth hijacker, Omar, treated her and the other passengers, for example, letting them have cigarettes. Omar sings of his desire for martyrdom for his cause. At the end of the scene, Omar and Molqi have a dispute, and Molqi takes Klinghoffer away. The "Desert Chorus" follows.

Scene 2

Marilyn Klinghoffer talks about disability, illness, and death. She thinks that her husband Leon was taken to the ship's hospital, but he was shot, off-stage. The hijackers have ordered the Captain to say they will kill another passenger every fifteen minutes. Instead, the Captain offers himself as the sole next person to be killed. Molqi appears and says that Leon Klinghoffer is dead. The "Aria of the Falling Body (Gymnopédie)", sung by Klinghoffer, follows.

The "Day Chorus" links scene 2 to scene 3.

Scene 3

After the hijackers have surrendered and the surviving passengers have disembarked safely in port, the Captain remains to tell Marilyn Klinghoffer about her husband's death. She reacts with sorrow and rage toward the Captain, for what she sees as his accommodation of the hijackers. Her final sentiment is that she wished that she could have died in her husband's place.

== Musical analysis ==
The general style of the opera's music resembles that of Adams' minimalist music period, in the vein also of music by Philip Glass and Steve Reich. Intervallic relationships such as affekt are used to evoke certain emotions. The drama is portrayed primarily in long monologues by individual characters, with commentary by the chorus, which does not take part in the action.

Both Adams and Sellars have acknowledged the affinity of the opera's dramatic structure to the sacred oratorios of Johann Sebastian Bach, in particular his Passions. The plot of the opera does not contain a detailed re-enactment of the events of the hijacking and the murder of Klinghoffer; the major events are not directly portrayed on stage and occur between the opera's staged scenes. The artists originally considered the opera as more of a "dramatic meditation" or "reflection", in the manner of an oratorio, rather than a conventional narrative opera driven by plot.

Based on this aspect, the opera has been criticized as undramatic and static, particularly in act 1, whereas act 2 is more "conventional" in terms of operatic narrative. In defence of this unconventional structure, John Ginman has analysed the particular dramaturgy and structure of the opera.

The opera's choral passages have been performed and recorded separately as Choruses from Klinghoffer.

== Controversy and allegations of antisemitism ==
Controversy surrounded the American premiere and other productions in the years which followed. Some critics and audience members condemned the production as antisemitic and appearing to be sympathetic to the hijackers. Adams, Goodman, and Sellars repeatedly claimed that they were trying to give equal voice to both Israelis and Palestinians with respect to the political background.

Lisa Klinghoffer and Ilsa Klinghoffer, the daughters of Leon and Marilyn Klinghoffer, anonymously attended the 1991 U.S. premiere of the opera in New York City. Afterward the Klinghoffer family released the following statement about the opera: "We are outraged at the exploitation of our parents and the coldblooded murder of our father as the centerpiece of a production that appears to us to be anti-Semitic."

The dramatic expression of asserted Palestinian historical grievances generated criticism of the opera's alleged sympathy with Palestinian terrorism. Others accused the creators of anti-Semitism for their portrayal of fictional Jewish-American neighbours of the Klinghoffers, the Rumors, in a scene in the original version. The couple were characterized in a way many Jews believed to be offensive and inappropriately satirical. The New York Times theater critic Edward Rothstein was particularly scathing in describing the scene and its place in the play; he described it as expressing "scorn of American Jews and anybody else without mythic claims on the world's attention" while eliminating altogether the Israeli position, asking rhetorically "Who could tell from this work just what the Jewish side really is – a sort of touristy attachment to an ancient land?" Following the American premiere, Adams deleted this scene, while revising his opera for all future productions.

Following the September 11 attacks, the Boston Symphony Orchestra cancelled a scheduled performance in November 2001 of extracts from the opera. This was partly in deference to a member of the Tanglewood Festival Chorus, who lost a family member on one of the hijacked planes, as well as due to perceptions that the work was overly sympathetic to terrorists. In a widely discussed New York Times article, Richard Taruskin defended the orchestra's action. He denounced Adams and the opera for "romanticizing terrorists." John Rockwell of The New York Times, in a review of the Penny Woolcock film version, countered that the opera ultimately "shows unequivocally that murder is nothing more than that, vicious and unconscionable."

Adams responded to Taruskin's criticisms on a number of occasions, including this 2004 statement:

Not long ago our attorney general, John Ashcroft, said that anyone who questioned his policies on civil rights after September 11 was aiding terrorists; what Taruskin said was the aesthetic version of that. If there is an aesthetic viewpoint that does not agree with his, it should not be heard. I find that very disturbing indeed.

In a more academic analysis, musicologist Robert Fink countered Taruskin's accusations of antisemitism, with particular reference to the deleted scene with the Rumor family. Fink has discussed how the removal of this scene disrupted the original dramaturgical structure of the opera, as the singers of the members of the Rumor family took on symbolically ironic later roles in the opera. Fink further posited that the reaction of American audiences to the portrayal of the Rumor family was partly because it was sociologically accurate. He discussed the scene in the historical context of past depictions in American popular culture of Jewish-American families. A separate academic study by Ruth Sara Longobardi discusses the opera with respect to issues about depictions of Palestinians and Jews. She explores how the use of contemporary media in productions, such as the Penny Woolcock film of the opera, affects perception of the two sides of the political conflict.

The 2009 Juilliard performance generated renewed controversy. A letter to The Juilliard Journal protested the opera as "a political statement made by the composer to justify an act of terrorism by four Palestinians." The school's president, Joseph W. Polisi, responded with his own letter, stating that he was "a longtime friend of Israel and have visited the country on numerous occasions", as well as a recipient of the King Solomon Award from the America-Israel Cultural Foundation. He described Klinghoffer as "a profoundly perceptive and human commentary on a political/religious problem that continues to find no resolution." He added that Juilliard and other institutions "have to be responsible for maintaining an environment in which challenging, as well as comforting, works of art are presented to the public."

External image
- Protesters picket the opening night, September 22, 2014

In June 2014, the Metropolitan Opera in New York cancelled an international simulcast and radio broadcast of this opera due to "an outpouring of concern" locally that it "might be used to fan global anti-semitism". In addition to cancelling both broadcasts, the company agreed to include a statement from Klinghoffer's daughters in the printed program of the production. Peter Gelb, general manager for the Met, stated:

I'm convinced that the opera is not anti-Semitic, but I've also become convinced that there is genuine concern in the international Jewish community that the live transmission of The Death of Klinghoffer would be inappropriate at this time of rising anti-Semitism, particularly in Europe.

In an official statement, Adams said: "The cancellation of the international telecast is a deeply regrettable decision and goes far beyond issues of 'artistic freedom,' and ends in promoting the same kind of intolerance that the opera's detractors claim to be preventing."

In a September 2014 New York magazine piece, critic Justin Davidson denied that The Death of Klinghoffer was anti-Semitic or glorified terrorism, stating that the title character is "the opera's moral core, the one fully functioning human being." He described the opera as "imperfect" and "politically troubling", writing that its attempt to show the historical justifications for both sides is both needlessly provocative and hampers the drama: "Explaining historical events is not an opera's job, and never has been. [...] What matters is how vast events frame a human drama, translated into musical form." He also said that the decision to model the opera on the Bach Passions "might actually be the most offensive thing about the opera, since a Jewish murder victim is conscripted to serve as a Christian symbol of redemption."

First Amendment expert Floyd Abrams wrote in October 2014 that, though there were no First Amendment issues: "the killers ... chose to commit their crime. So did Lee Harvey Oswald, James Earl Ray and Osama bin Laden. We can expect no arias to be sung in their defense at the Metropolitan Opera, and there is no justification for any to be sung for the Klinghoffer killers."

Former New York City mayor and opera fan Rudy Giuliani wrote that while the Met had a First Amendment right to present the opera,

Equally, all of us have as strong a First Amendment right to ... warn people that this work is both a distortion of history and helped, in some ways, to foster a three decade long feckless policy of creating a moral equivalency between the Palestinian Authority, a corrupt terrorist organization, and the state of Israel, a democracy ruled by law.

American writer and feminist Phyllis Chesler, an opera aficionado, conceded the legal and artistic right to perform the opera, but claimed that it "beatifies terrorism, both musically and in the libretto".

In support of the production, Oskar Eustis, the artistic director of The Public Theater said: "It is not only permissible for the Met to do this piece – it's required for the Met to do the piece. It is a powerful and important opera."

Critic Joshua Barone said in 2022 that the opera "is virtually impossible to produce in the United States." When the work was revived in 2026, it was in Florence, Italy.

In 2024, Adams discussed this opera and his other work at length on the BBC Radio 4 program This Cultural Life.
