= Christopher Magiera =

American operatic baritone (born 1983)

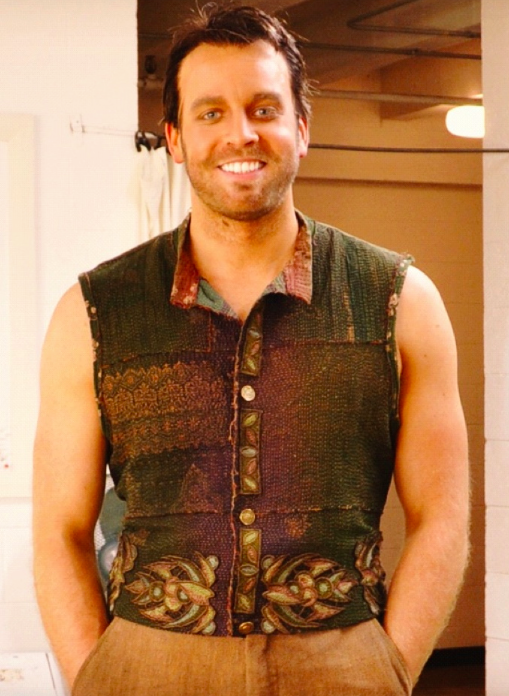
- Magiera at the Santa Fe Opera in 2012
- Born: May 30, 1983 (age 43); Evanston, Illinois, U.S.
- Education: Wake Forest University (BA); Peabody Conservatory (MA)
- Occupation: Operatic baritone

Christopher Magiera (born May 30, 1983) is an American operatic baritone.

== Early life and education ==
Born in Evanston, Illinois, Magiera earned a bachelor's degree from Wake Forest University a master's degree from the Peabody Conservatory. He also attended the Yale School of Music and Bavarian State Opera Opernstudio.

== Career ==
Magiera was employed by Eytan Pessen as a member at the Semperoper in Dresden from 2010 to 2012.

He made his American operatic debut at the age of 26 in the title role of Eugene Onegin with the Opera Theatre of Saint Louis. Since then, Magiera has performed worldwide as a leading baritone, singing hundreds of performances throughout the world. He has been seen in the title roles of Eugene Onegin, Figaro (Il barbiere di Siviglia), Joseph De Rocher (Dead Man Walking) and Don Giovanni, as well as in the roles of Conte Almaviva (Le nozze di Figaro), Valentin (Faust), Marcello (La bohème), Papageno (Die Zauberflöte), Robert (Iolanta), The Captain (The Death of Klinghoffer), Sharpless (Madama Butterfly) and Zurga (The Pearl Fishers), among many others.

He has performed at renowned opera houses throughout the world including the Semperoper Dresden, Bayerische Staatsoper, Santa Fe Opera, Opera Theatre of St. Louis, Lyric Opera of Chicago, English National Opera, Teatro di San Carlo, Teatro Massimo Palermo, and Vancouver Opera, among others. In concert he has performed at the Knowlton Festival of the Montreal Symphony Orchestra, the Shanghai Symphony Orchestra, and with the Bilkent Symphony Orchestra of Ankara, Turkey, among others. Magiera has performed with conductors such as Kent Nagano, Riccardo Frizza, Vladimir Jurowski, Yu Long, Fabio Luisi and Emmanuel Villaume among others.

== Awards ==
Magiera has received awards from numerous national and international competitions and organizations throughout his career, including those from:

- Metropolitan Opera National Council Auditions – National Grand Finalist, New England Region – First Place, Connecticut District – First Place
- Operalia – International Finalist
- Sullivan Foundation – Grand Prize
- Veronica Dunne International Vocal Competition
- Jensen Foundation
- Gerda Lissner International Vocal Competition – 2nd Prize
- Liederkranz Foundation
- Bel Canto Foundation
- Licia Albanese Puccini Foundation
- Giulio Gari Foundation
- Anna Sosenko Assist Trust Fund
- Opera Birmingham Competition – First Prize
- Partners for the Arts Competition – First Prize
- Harlem Opera Theater – 2nd Prize
- Fort Worth Opera McCammon Competition
- Florida Grand Opera – YPO Competition – First Prize Junior Division
- Oratorio Society of New York – Johannes Somary Award
- Mario Lanza Institute
- Annie Wentz Prize
