= Doug Turner (sound engineer) =

British-American sound engineer (1931–2025)

- Born: Douglas E. Turner; July 17, 1931; England
- Died: May 5, 2025 (aged 93); Agua Dulce, California, U.S.
- Occupation: Sound engineer

Douglas E. Turner (July 17, 1931 – May 5, 2025) was a British-American sound engineer. He was nominated for a British Academy Film Award in the category Best Soundtrack for the film Deliverance.

In addition to his British Academy Film Award nomination, he won a Primetime Emmy Award and was nominated for two more in the category Outstanding Sound Mixing for his work on the television program The X-Files, and also the television films The Hijacking of the Achille Lauro and Caroline?.

Turner died on May 5, 2025, at his home in Agua Dulce, California, at the age of 93.

== Selected filmography ==
- Deliverance (1972; co-nominated with Jim Atkinson and Walter Goss)
