= Leon Klinghoffer =

Achille Lauro hijacking victim (1916–1985)

- The last photo of Leon Klinghoffer, taken on the cruise ship Achille Lauro in 1985.
- Born: September 24, 1916; New York City, U.S.
- Died: October 8, 1985 (aged 69); Achille Lauro
- Cause of death: Gunshot wound
- Resting place: Beth David Memorial Park; Kenilworth, New Jersey, United States
- Occupation: Appliance manufacturer
- Spouse: Marilyn Windwehr (m. 1949)
- Children: 2

Leon Klinghoffer (September 24, 1916 – October 8, 1985) was an American store owner and appliance creator who was shot, killed and thrown overboard from the cruise ship Achille Lauro by members of the Palestinian Liberation Front who hijacked the ship in 1985.

== Personal life ==
Klinghoffer grew up on Suffolk Street on the Lower East Side of Manhattan in New York City. Among his close friends was Jack Kirby, who grew up in the same neighborhood and who became well known for his work involving comic books.

Klinghoffer married Marilyn (born Windwehr), the daughter of a haberdasher, in September 1949. The couple had two daughters. Klinghoffer suffered two strokes later in his life that caused him to use a wheelchair.

== Career ==
While he was growing up, Klinghoffer worked in his family's hardware store, Klinghoffer Supply Company. In 1942, he joined the Army Air Force and was trained as a navigator. He flew missions in Consolidated B-24 Liberator bombers with the 93rd Bombardment Group in the European theatre of World War II.

After his honorable discharge from the Army in January 1944, Klinghoffer and his brother Albert took over the store and began to invent appliances. A few years later, the two brothers founded the Roto-Broil Corporation of America. Their feature item was the Roto-Broil Rotisserie Oven or Roto-Broil 400, a common kitchen appliance during the 1950s.

== Hijacking and shooting ==
In 1985, Klinghoffer (then 69, retired, and using a wheelchair) was on a cruise on the Achille Lauro with his wife Marilyn to celebrate their 36th wedding anniversary. On October 7, four hijackers from the Palestinian Liberation Front (PLF) took control of the liner off Egypt as it was traveling from Alexandria to Port Said, Egypt. Taking the passengers and crew hostage, they ordered the captain to travel to Tartus, Syria, and demanded the release of 50 Palestinians, then in Israeli prisons, including the Lebanese prisoner Samir Kuntar, who had been responsible for the murder of five civilians during a terrorist attack in 1979.

The hijackers said that if the prisoners were not released they would begin killing hostages: "We will start executing at 3:00 p.m. sharp." Syria, having consulted with the U.S. and Italian governments, did not respond to any of the demands.

As 3:00 p.m. neared, the terrorists began to decide who to kill by shuffling the U.S., British, and Austrian hostages' passports. They selected Leon Klinghoffer to be killed first. Several reasons have been proposed that may have contributed to why Klinghoffer was chosen. Earlier in the hijacking, he had refused to be silent when gunmen took his watch and cigarettes, becoming brusque and complaining in his slurred speech; this antagonized some of the hijackers, though one of them gave Klinghoffer his possessions back. Additionally, Klinghoffer was Jewish and American, and his wheelchair made him both difficult to move around the ship and his absence less likely to cause resistance among the surviving hostages. One of the hijackers, Youssef Majed al-Molqi, later gave a statement on why he was chosen: "I and Bassm [al-Ashker] agreed that the first hostage to be killed had to be an American. I chose Klinghoffer, an invalid, so that they would know that we had no pity for anyone, just as the Americans, arming Israel, do not take into consideration that Israel kills women and children of our people."

Molqi ordered Manuel de Souza, a Portuguese waiter, to accompany him and push Klinghoffer outside onto the open deck. Klinghoffer was taken back along the entire deck of the ship to the stern. Molqi ordered Souza to return into the ship. The other terrorists moved the rest of the hostages back down into the lounge. Marilyn Klinghoffer noticed that Leon was not there and began to weep. Molqi shot Leon Klinghoffer once in the head and again in the chest. He died instantly, toppling onto his face. Molqi then went in and ordered Souza to throw the body over the side of the ship. When Souza was unable to do the task alone, Molqi found Italian hairdresser Ferruccio Alberti and forced the two of them at gunpoint to throw the body and then the wheelchair into the sea.

Several of the hostages heard the shots and splashes, including Marilyn Klinghoffer. She pleaded with the hijackers to let her see her husband in the infirmary, but they refused. She feared the worst but remained hopeful. She learned the truth only after the hijackers left the ship at Port Said. Molqi, with blood-splattered clothing, returned to the other terrorists and told them, "I have killed the American". He and Bassam al-Ashker then went to the bridge. Handing Klinghoffer's passport to Captain De Rosa, he raised a finger and said "boom, boom".

Molqi ordered De Rosa to tell the Syrians that a passenger had been killed and that they were prepared to kill another. The Syrians responded by telling Molqi to "go back where you came from". Finding no help in Syria, Molqi ordered De Rosa to move the ship to Libya. Palestine Liberation Organization (PLO) Foreign Secretary Farouq Qaddumi said that perhaps the terminally ill Marilyn had killed her husband for insurance money. However, the PLF leader Muhammad Zaidan said in 1996 that the hijack was a mistake, and apologized for killing Klinghoffer.

Initially, the hijackers were granted safe passage to Tunisia, but U.S. president Ronald Reagan ordered a U.S. fighter airplane to intercept their airplane, forcing it to land at Naval Air Station Sigonella in Italy. After an extradition dispute, Italian authorities arrested and tried the Palestinian terrorists.

Klinghoffer's body was found by Syrians on October 14 or 15, and it was returned to the United States about October 20. His funeral, with 800 mourners in attendance, was performed at Temple Shaaray Tefila in New York City. Klinghoffer was buried at Beth David Memorial Park in Kenilworth, New Jersey. On February 9, four months after his death, his wife Marilyn (1926–1986) died of cancer. They were survived by two daughters, Ilsa and Lisa Klinghoffer.

== Aftermath ==
Five days after the murder, Rabbi Morris Gordon and a group of student activists performed a mock Jewish funeral service for Leon Klinghoffer in front of the Palestine Liberation Organization's Washington, D.C., office to call attention to the group's role in the killing of an American military veteran.

After the death of their parents, the Klinghoffers' daughters established the Leon and Marilyn Klinghoffer Memorial Foundation with the Anti-Defamation League. The foundation combats terrorism through educational, political, and legal means. The foundation is funded by an undisclosed settlement paid by the PLO to the Klinghoffers to settle a lawsuit seeking damages for the PLO's role in the hijacking (Klinghoffer v. PLO, 739 F. Supp. 854 (S.D.N.Y. 1990) and Klinghoffer v. PLO, 937 F.2d 44, 50 (2d Cir. 1991). This lawsuit spurred passage of the Antiterrorism Act of 1990, which made it easier for victims of terrorism to sue terrorists and collect civil damages for losses incurred.

The ship involved in the hijacking, the Achille Lauro, returned to cruise duty until it was caught afire off the coast of Somalia on November 30, 1994. After evacuating the ship of passengers, the crew could not control the fire, and the abandoned ship sank on December 2. Three people died.

== Portrayals ==
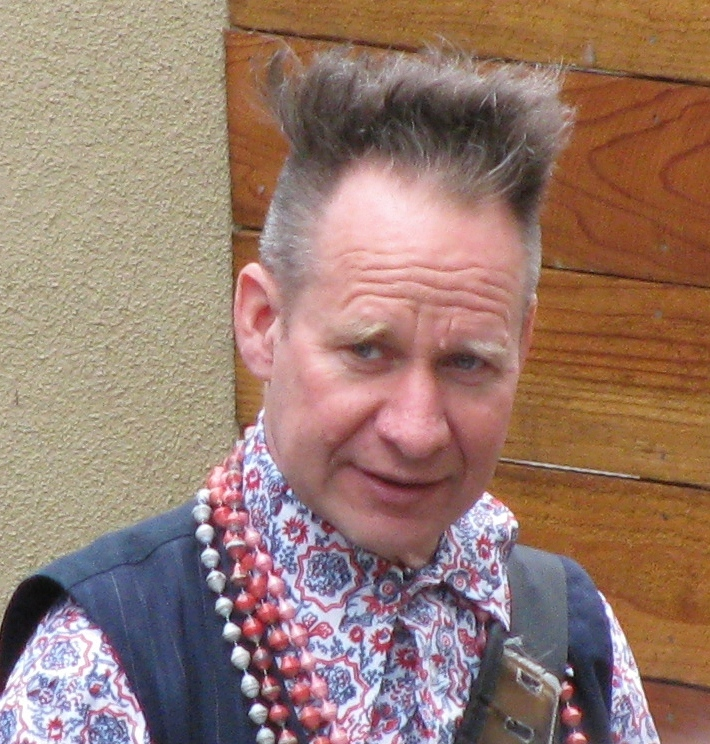
Peter Sellars, who originated the concept of the opera The Death of Klinghoffer and directed its first performance.

The hijacking was made into a television movie in 1990, Voyage of Terror: The Achille Lauro Affair featuring Burt Lancaster and Eva Marie Saint.

Karl Malden played the role of Klinghoffer in the 1989 television movie The Hijacking of the Achille Lauro.

The concept of the opera The Death of Klinghoffer originated with theatre director Peter Sellars, who was a major collaborator, as was choreographer Mark Morris. It was American composer John Adams' second opera, based on the events of 1985. It opened to great controversy in 1991. It featured a libretto by Alice Goodman. In the opera, Klinghoffer sings two arias, one shortly before he is killed and one after his death. The Los Angeles Opera shared in the work's commission but never presented it. The opera has since drawn controversy, including allegations by some (including Klinghoffer's two daughters) that the opera is antisemitic and glorifies terrorism. The work's creators and others have disputed these criticisms. A Prix Italia-winning television version of the opera, starring Sanford Sylvan and Christopher Maltman, and directed by Penny Woolcock, was screened by United Kingdom's Channel 4 in 2003.

Klinghoffer (and his supposed travel diary) play a minor role in Philip Roth's 1993 novel Operation Shylock.

Klinghoffer is mentioned in the graphic novel Palestine by Joe Sacco.

== See also ==
- Alex Odeh
