= Alice Goodman =

American poet & librettist

The Reverend Alice Goodman
- Born: 1958 (age 67–68); St. Paul, Minnesota
- Occupations: Librettist, priest
- Spouse: Sir Geoffrey Hill (m. 1987; died 2016)
- Children: 1
- Writing career
- Genres: poetry, opera
- Notable works: Nixon In China, The Death of Klinghoffer

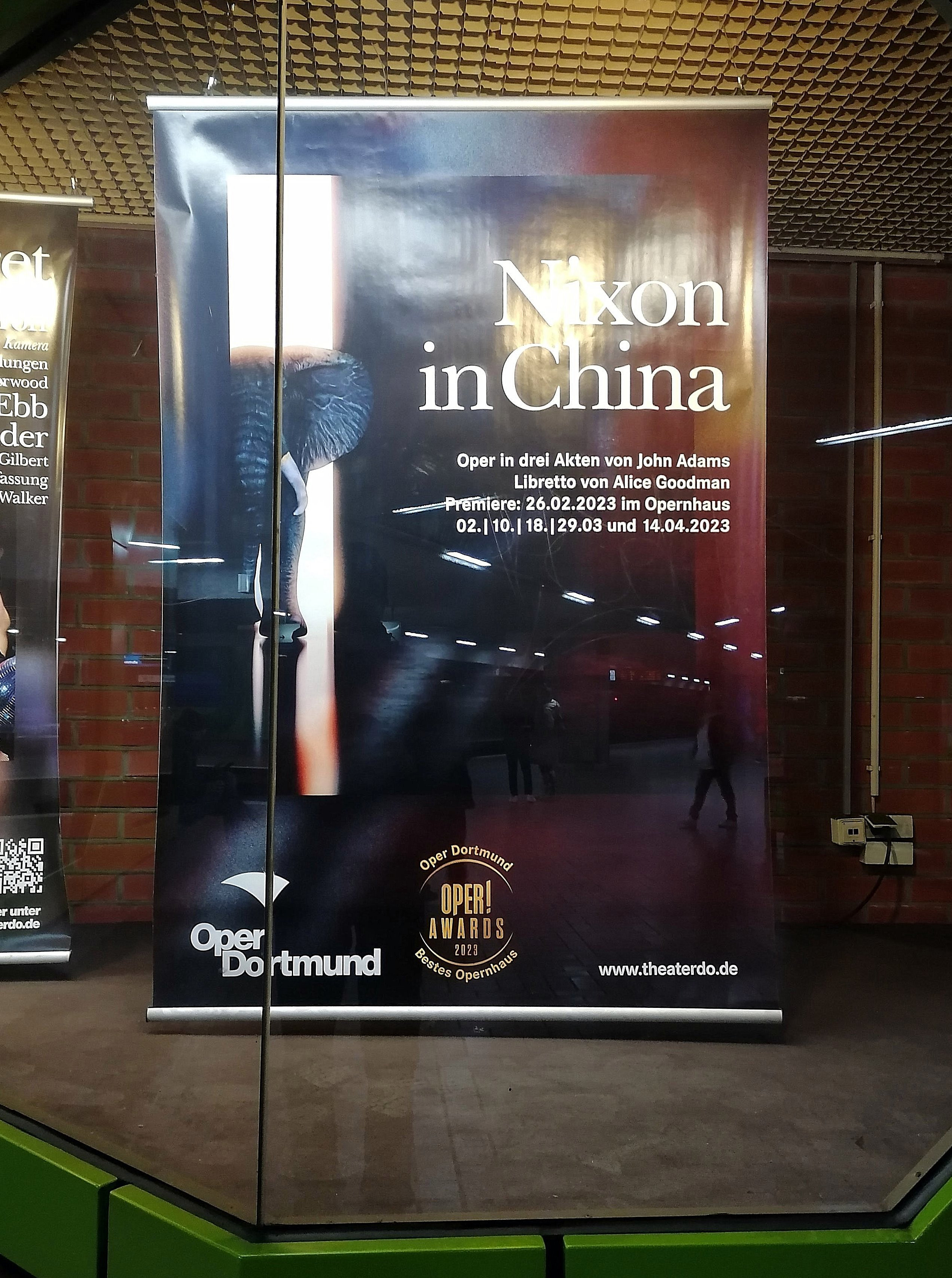
Poster for a production of Nixon in China at Oper Dortmund, 2023

Alice Goodman, Lady Hill (born 1958) is an American poet and librettist. She is also an Anglican priest, working in England.

== Biography ==
Goodman was born in St. Paul, Minnesota, and attended and graduated from Breck School. She studied English and American literature at Harvard University, graduating with a Bachelor of Arts (BA) degree in 1980, and Girton College, Cambridge, graduating with a further BA in 1982. During the 1980s she published poems in venues such as Poetry and the London Review of Books. She received her Master of Divinity (MDiv) degree from the Boston University School of Theology in 1997.

She wrote the libretti for the first two operas of John Adams, Nixon in China and The Death of Klinghoffer. Goodman continued writing with Adams on his next opera, Doctor Atomic, but withdrew from this project after a year. A decade after the eventual premiere of that opera, she wrote the text for a choral cantata by Tarik O'Regan (A Letter of Rights, 2015), commissioned as part of the celebrations for the 800th anniversary of Magna Carta.

In 2017, NYRB published Goodman's texts for Nixon and Klinghoffer, along with her translation of the libretto for The Magic Flute, as the collection History is Our Mother: Three Libretti, with an introduction by James Williams.

She was raised as a Reform Jew, and converted to Christianity as an adult, in 1989. From 2000 to 2001, she trained for ordination at Ripon College Cuddesdon. She was ordained in the Church of England as a deacon in 2001 and as a priest in 2002. In 2006, Alice Goodman took up the post of chaplain at Trinity College, Cambridge, and in 2011 became Rector of a group of parishes in Cambridgeshire including Fulbourn.

Goodman married the noted English poet Geoffrey Hill in 1987. The couple has one daughter, Alberta.
