= MS Oranje =

Ship

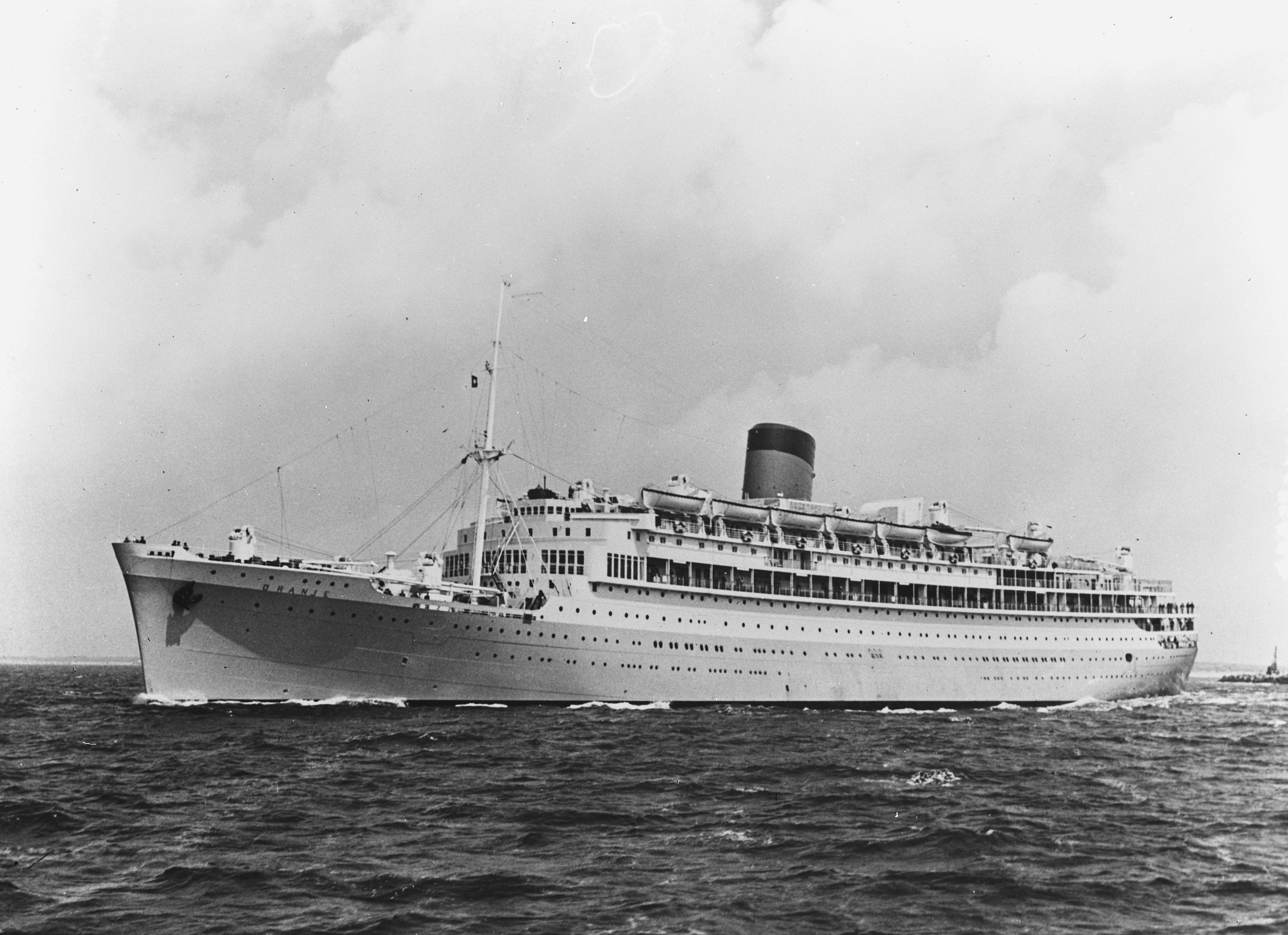
- The Oranje in her original Netherland Line livery

History
- Name: Oranje (1939–1964); Angelina Lauro (1965–1979)
- Owner: Netherland Line (1939–1964); Lauro Lines (1965–1979)
- Operator: Netherlands Lines (1939–1941); Australian Government (WWII Service) (1941–1946); Netherlands Lines (1947–1964); Lauro Lines (1965–1977); Costa Cruises (Chartered 1977–1979)
- Port of registry: 1939–1964: Amsterdam, Netherlands; 1964–1979: Naples, Italy
- Builder: Nederlandsche Scheepsbouw Maatschappij, Amsterdam, Netherlands
- Yard number: 270
- Laid down: 2 July 1937
- Launched: 8 September 1938
- Completed: 15 July 1939
- Maiden voyage: 1939
- In service: 1939
- Out of service: 30 March 1979
- Identification: Call sign: PGOF → IBHO; IMO number: 5264077
- Fate: Destroyed by fire on 30 March 1979, sank on 24 September 1979

General characteristics
- Tonnage: 24,377 GRT (after refit); 20,017 GRT(originally)
- Length: 672.4 ft (204.9 m) (after refit); 656 ft (200 m) (originally)
- Beam: 83.6 ft (25.5 m)
- Decks: 8
- Installed power: 3 × 12-cylinder Sulzer diesels 37,500 hp (28,000 kW) at 145 rpm
- Propulsion: Triple screw
- Speed: 22 knots (41 km/h; 25 mph) (service); 26 knots (48 km/h; 30 mph) (maximum)
- Capacity: 740 passengers, original in 1939; 1,230 passengers, 1964 refit

MS Oranje, later known as Angelina Lauro, was a Dutch passenger liner, a wartime hospital ship, and finally a cruise ship. The ship underwent 25 years' service as Oranje, and fifteen as Angelina Lauro. She was a cruise ship for the last seven years of her career. An extensive film of a cruise she made in 1954 exists in the London Cinema Museum archive.

In 1979, while the vessel was docked in a port at Saint Thomas, U.S. Virgin Islands, a fire broke out in the crew area that spread to the passenger areas; and she was declared a total loss. She sank on her route to the scrapyard.

== History ==
=== Early career and World War 2 ===
The Oranje was ordered by Netherland Line and was built in the Nederlandsche Scheepsbouw Maatschappij shipyard. The ship was ceremonially launched on 8 September 1938, On 15 July 1939, the finished ship was delivered to the Netherland Line and on September 4, 1939, she left Amsterdam on her maiden voyage to Batavia (Jakarta). World War II had begun days before she departed, so the ship was laid up in Surabaya, without completing her maiden voyage home. In February 1941, the ship's captain was ordered to sail to Sydney and hand over his ship to the Royal Australian Navy. The Dutch government agreed with the Australian government that the Oranje would be converted into a hospital ship. Although she was under Australian command, she kept her Dutch crew and remained under the Dutch flag throughout the war.

=== Post-war career ===
From October 1946 to 1957, the ship returned to its original owners to resume passenger service. The Indonesian War of Independence and its nationalist course led to a decrease in passenger numbers. In February 1951, the Oranje made her first around the world cruise: from Amsterdam via the Panama Canal to Australia and New Zealand and back via Singapore and the Suez Canal to Amsterdam. Between 8 and 18 June 1951, she voyaged to Lisbon and Madeira with 650 passengers.

==== Collision with Willem Ruys ====
On 6 January 1953, MS Oranje collided in the Red Sea with Willem Ruys, which was heading in the opposite direction. At that time, it was common for passenger ships to pass each other at close range to entertain their passengers. During the (later heavily criticized) abrupt and fast approach of Oranje, Willem Ruys made an unexpected swing to port, resulting in a collision. Oranje badly damaged her bow. As she might have been impounded for safety reasons, she was unable to call at Colombo as scheduled and went directly to Jakarta. Willem Ruys suffered less damage. There was no loss of life. Later, it was determined that miscommunication on both ships had caused the collision. The ship's final voyage for Netherland Line was in 1964.

=== Lauro Lines ===
On 4 September 1964, both she and the Willem Ruys were sold to an Italian company, Flotta Lauro Lines. Oranje was then sent to Genoa for an extensive refit at the Cantieri Navali del Tirreno shipyards. On 6 March 1966 the Angelina Lauro departed on her maiden voyage from Bremerhaven to Fremantle, Melbourne, Sydney, and Wellington. In 1977 the ship was chartered by Costa Cruises. However, in 1979 while in a pier at Saint Thomas, she caught fire, which burned in the ship's hull for days; and was declared a total loss. On 30 July 1979, the ship's burned hull was planned to be towed to a scrapyard at Kaohsiung. Then on 21 September 1979, the ship's weakened hull (which the fire had affected), began to fill with water. Three days later the Angelina Lauro sank in the mid-Pacific, on 24 September 1979.

== Gallery ==
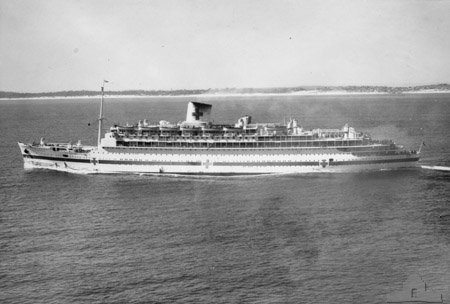
Oranje in August 1941, shortly after her conversion to a hospital ship

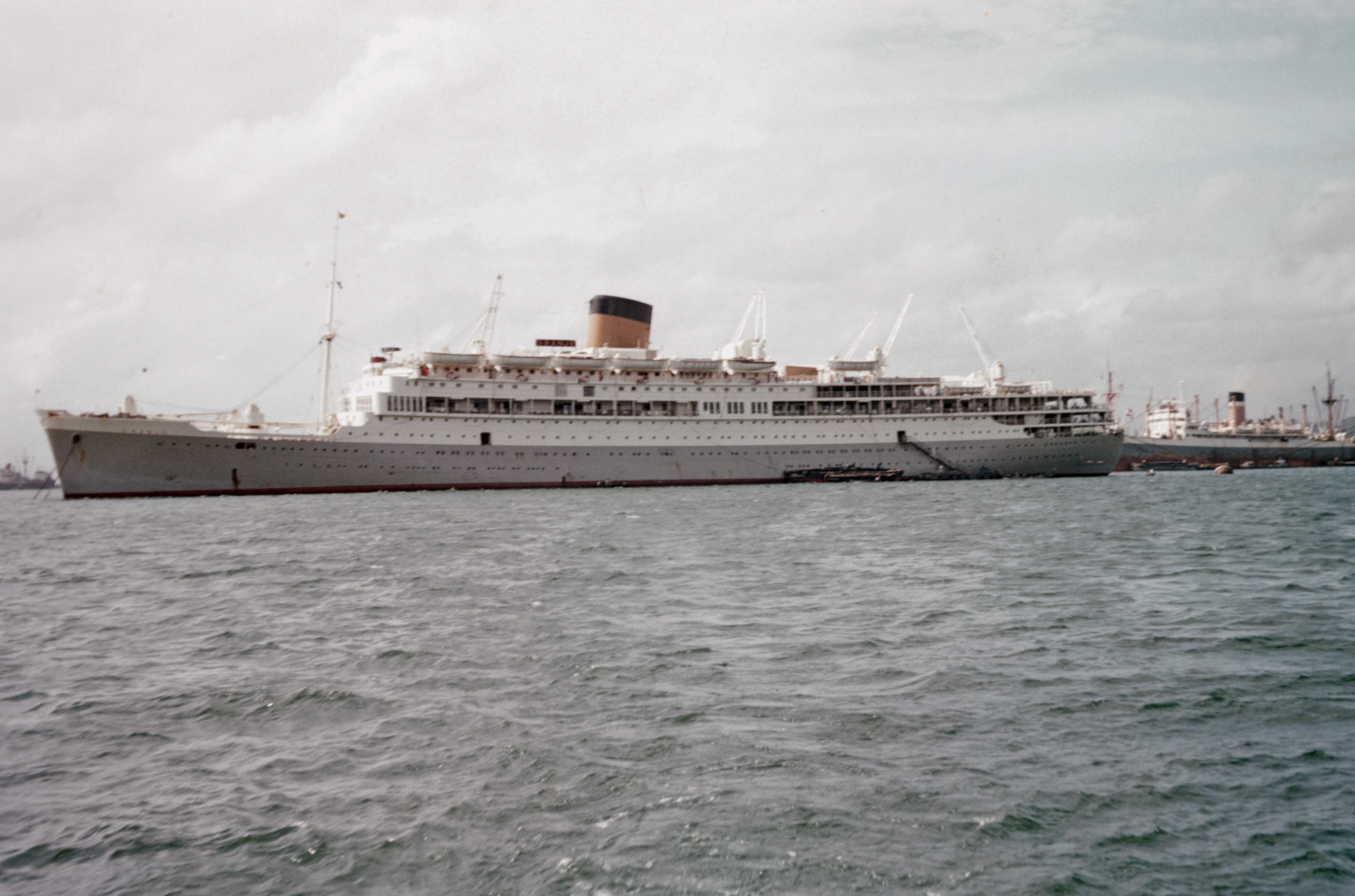
Oranje at Colombo in 1960

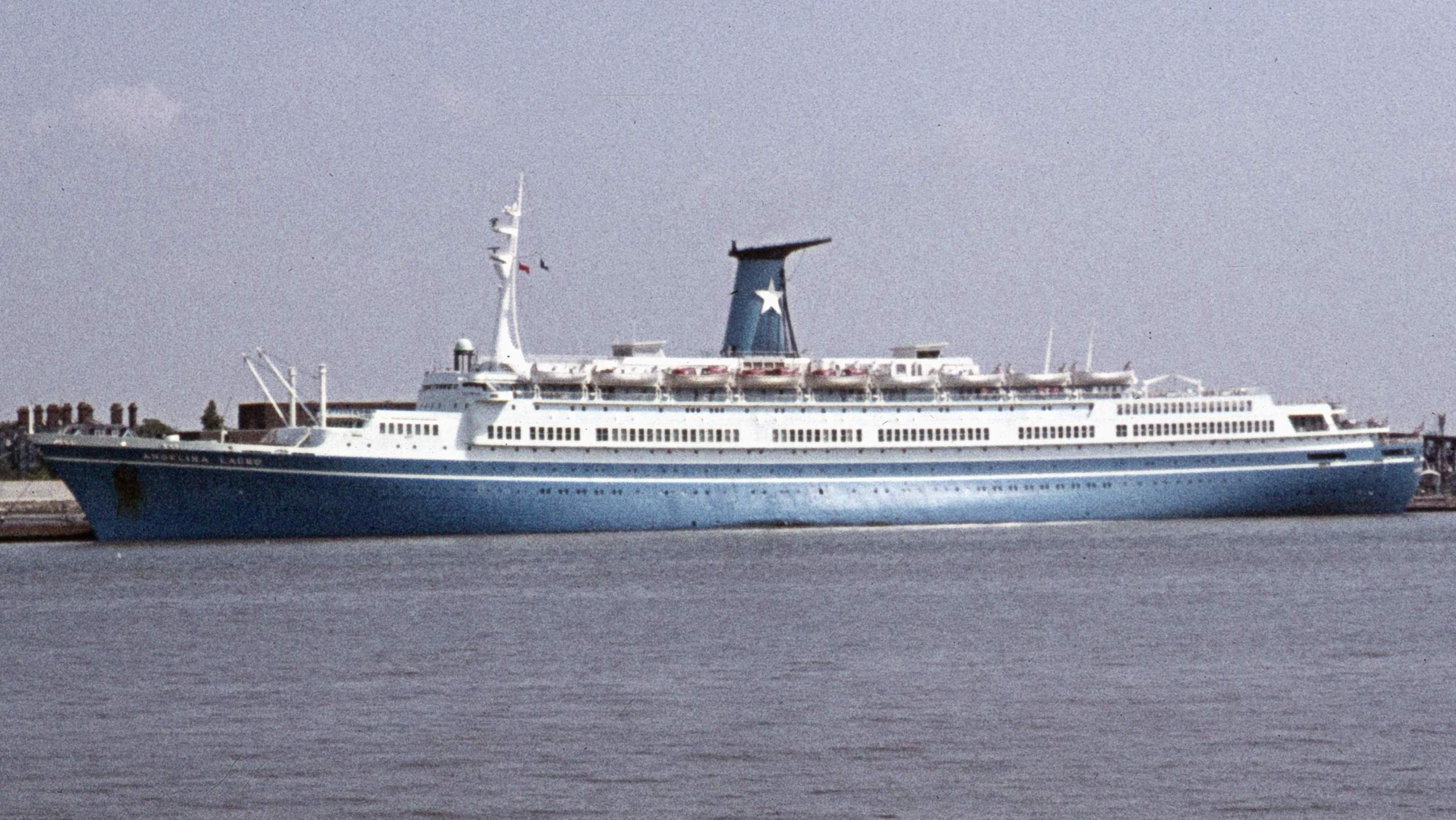
Angelina Lauro at Tilbury, 1976
