= The Hijacking of the Achille Lauro =

1989 television film by Robert L. Collins

- Written by: Robert L. Collins
- Directed by: Robert L. Collins
- Starring: Karl Malden; Lee Grant; E. G. Marshall; Vera Miles
- Composer: Chris Boardman
- Country of origin: United States
- Original language: English

Production
- Executive producers: Tamara Asseyev; Michael Jaffe
- Producer: Tamara Asseyev
- Production locations: Sydney, Australia
- Cinematography: Vince Monton
- Editor: Robert K. Lambert
- Running time: 100 minutes
- Production companies: New World Television; Spectacor Films; Samson Productions; Tamara Asseyev Productions

Original release
- Network: NBC
- Release: February 13, 1989

The Hijacking of the Achille Lauro is a 1989 American drama television film written and directed by Robert L. Collins. The film stars Karl Malden, Lee Grant, E. G. Marshall, and Vera Miles. It focuses on the action and emotional impact of the 1985 terrorist incident that took the life of Leon Klinghoffer.

== Cast ==
- Karl Malden as Leon Klinghoffer
- Lee Grant as Marilyn Klinghoffer
- E. G. Marshall as Stanley 'Stan' Kubacki
- Vera Miles as Sophie Kubacki
- Christina Pickles as Charlotte Spiegel
- Susan Lyons as Ruth
- Robert Mammone as Aldo
- Barry Otto as Kevin Blaxland
- Neva Small as Lisa Klinghoffer
- Monica Trapaga as Ilsa Klinghoffer
- Phillip Hinton as Captain De Rosa
- Mohab Boctor as Magid al-Moqui
- Charles Nassif as Bassam al-Asker
- John Orcsik as Samir al-Quantari
- Michael Van Schoor as Ahmed al-Assadi
- Nabil Hakkim as Abbul Abbas
- Brian Harrison as Ambassador Nicholas Veliotes
- Tony Helou as Ibrahim Abdelatif
- Robert Mammone as Aldo
- Alastair Duncan as Mossad Officer

== Awards and nominations ==
Year	Award	Category	Nominee(s)	Result	Ref.
1989	41st Primetime Creative Arts Emmy Awards	Outstanding Achievement in Music Composition for a Miniseries or a Special (Dramatic Underscore)	Chris Boardman	Nominated	
1989	41st Primetime Creative Arts Emmy Awards	Outstanding Single-Camera Picture Editing for a Miniseries or a Special (Single Camera Production)	Robert K. Lambert	Nominated	
1989	41st Primetime Creative Arts Emmy Awards	Outstanding Sound Mixing for a Miniseries or a Special	Grover B. Helsley; William McCaughey; Noel Quinn; Doug E. Turner	Nominated	

== See also ==
- Voyage of Terror: The Achille Lauro Affair (1990)
