= Indoor Recreation of Orleans County =

Coordinates: 44.957024°N 72.157763°W

Indoor Recreation of Orleans County, called IROC, was a not-for-profit recreation center for the people of Orleans County, Vermont. It was located off US 5, the Newport-Derby Road, in Derby, Vermont. The President was Phil White.

5,000 people visited IROC 150,000 times (total) in 2006. The indoor rotary track is open to the public for free. There were 25,000 visits to it in 2006.

In 2007, Vermont Governor Jim Douglas gave IROC the Healthy Aging Award as Organizational Champion.

It closed for lack of financing in 2012. A building supply chain bought the building.

== Outdoor events ==
IROC sponsored a summer series of outdoor events including The Dandelion Run Half Marathon in support of the Victims Assistance fund, The Tour de Kingdom Bike Race, The Kingdom Swim and triathlon at the end of the summer.

== Funding ==
The building cost $6.3 million. The association raised $4 million in donations and grants. In 2007, $2.3 million was still needed to fully pay for the building. The association was paying $100,000 annually in interest charges.
