= Achille Lauro hijacking =

1985 Palestinian Liberation Front hijacking

- Part of the Arab–Israeli conflict
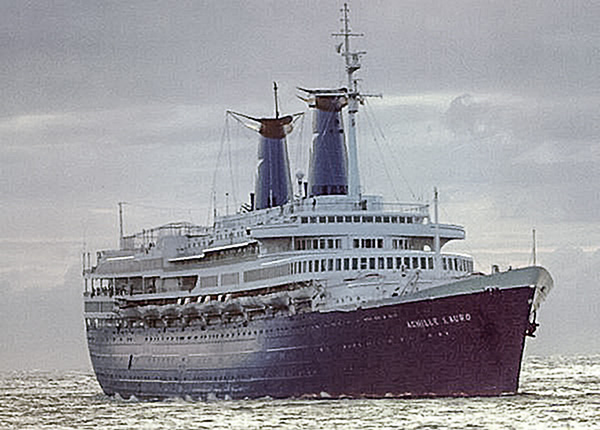
- The Achille Lauro c. 1987
- Location: MS Achille Lauro off the Egyptian coast
- Date: October 7–10, 1985
- Attack type: Hijacking and hostage crisis
- Weapons: Firearms and hand grenades
- Deaths: 1
- Perpetrator: Palestinian Liberation Front
- Motive: Publicity of Palestinian issues and release of Palestinian prisoners

The Achille Lauro hijacking took place on 7 October 1985, when the Italian ocean liner MS Achille Lauro was hijacked by four men representing the Palestinian Liberation Front (PLF) off the coast of Egypt, as she was sailing from Alexandria to Ashdod, Israel. A 69-year-old Jewish-American man in a wheelchair, Leon Klinghoffer, was murdered by the hijackers and thrown overboard. The hijacking sparked the "Sigonella Crisis".

== Background ==
=== Palestine Liberation Organization ===
After the Palestine Liberation Organization (PLO) was driven out of Jordan in 1970 and Southern Lebanon and Beirut in 1978 and 1982, respectively, PLO guerrillas had dispersed (under international guarantees of safety) to Tunisia, Yemen, Southern Yemen, Algeria, Jordan, Syria, Iraq and the Sudan.

Meanwhile, in Lebanon, PLO chairman Yasser Arafat had run into problems with Syrian President Hafez al-Assad, who in 1983 sought to wrest effective control of the group from him by backing a mutiny within the PLO. Arafat was backed by the Soviet Union and was helped to escape Lebanon by the president's brother, Rifaat al-Assad, and his "Red Knights" of Alawite notables near the Lebanese border with Syria. When the attempt to wrest control failed, the Syrian military backed the mutineers in an attack on Arafat loyalists within the Lebanese city of Tripoli. Arafat moved his loyalists and the PLO headquarters out of Tripoli to Tunisia.

Throughout the 1980s, other members of the PLO, as well as the Palestinian Liberation Front (PLF), launched attacks on both civilian and military targets in the north of Israel, across the Lebanese border. One such attack by the PLO's Force 17 on September 25, 1985, targeting an Israeli yacht in Larnaca, Cyprus, killed three Israelis. In response, the Israeli Air Force bombed the PLO headquarters in Tunis in Operation Wooden Leg on October 1, 1985. The headquarters was completely destroyed in this attack, and sixty PLO members were killed.

When Achille Lauro was hijacked, speculation arose that this was an act of retaliation for the Israeli bombing in Tunis. This was disputed by Abu Abbas' widow Reem al-Nimer in 2013. According to al-Nimer, the hijacking had been planned eleven months in advance, and the hijackers had already been on two 'dummy' training runs on Achille Lauro. The plan was to open fire on Israeli soldiers when the ship reached Ashdod – a suicide mission.

=== Palestinian Liberation Front ===
The hijacking of Achille Lauro was planned and executed by one of the three factions of the PLF. The first faction was headed by Taalat Yacoub, a Palestinian who opposed Arafat and was supported by Syria. The second faction was headed by Abd al-Fatah Ghanim, who also opposed Arafat. The last faction was headed by Abbas, who was loyal to Arafat and sat on the PLO Executive Committee; his faction of the PLF had already carried out a series of armed raids in Israel and the West Bank since the late 1970s.

In exchange for the release of hostages aboard Achille Lauro, the hijackers demanded the release of Lebanese national Samir Kuntar, a friend of Abbas. Kuntar and an accomplice had been jailed by five years before for attempting on April 22, 1979, to kidnap a Jewish family in the northern Israeli city of Nahariya, close to the Lebanese border. The botched kidnapping had resulted in the death of Israeli policeman Eliyahu Shahar, 31-year-old father Danny Kaiser, and his two daughters, four-year-old Einat and two year-old Yael, leaving wife and mother Smadar Haran Kaiser as the sole survivor.

== Prelude to the hijacking ==
=== Itinerary and embarkation ===
Achille Lauro embarked from Genoa, Italy, on 3 October 1985, with an itinerary for an eleven-day cruise which included ports of call in Alexandria in Egypt and Ashdod in Israel. The fares for a double-berthed cabin were between $955 and $1,550. The ship had become the property of the Italian government when its previous owner, Costa Lines, went bankrupt. The vessel was seized by the company's creditors, who in 1983 sold it to the state, who in turn leased it to Chandris cruise line under an agreement that would last until 1987.

The ship set out with 748 passengers. Among them was a group of close friends from New York and New Jersey who forwent their usual Jersey shore vacation in favor of a cruise. The trip celebrated the 58th birthday of Marilyn Klinghoffer, a personnel manager at a small publishing firm, who had fought colon cancer into remission, as well as her 36th wedding anniversary with Leon, who owned and operated a small appliance manufacturing firm. The pair had two adult daughters, 34-year-old Lisa, who was married, and 28-year-old Ilsa, who was engaged. Paralyzed on his right side as a result of two strokes, Leon could occasionally walk with a cane but usually relied on a wheelchair. In fact, the group had specifically chosen the Achille Lauro over other ships due to its wheelchair accessibility. Travelling with the Klinghoffers were their friends Frank and Mildred Hodes, Neil and June Kantor, Seymour and Viola Meskin, Sylvia Sherman, and Charlotte Spiegel.

Because ship hijackings were relatively rare at the time, the cruise line's security amounted to checking passports at Genoa. Standard procedure at the time did not include checking luggage. The New York Times reported at the time that the ship had security personnel, but it could not determine if they were armed. This lax security is particularly notable in a year that had already seen a spate of terrorist incidents within Europe and the Middle East, including the hijacking of TWA Flight 847, in which a hostage was slain. The TWA incident had even impacted the Mediterranean cruise business: Greece's Epirotiki Line took three of its ships – Jupiter, Jason, and Neptune – out of service when terrorism fears led to decreased travel demand overall in the region.

=== Early events ===
On Friday, October 4, Achille Lauro called in Naples, then sailed through the Straits of Messina; the Mediterranean was calm and the fall day was warm. Cruise manager Max Fico would later recall that he noticed that several young men were acting suspicious, in that they kept to themselves, refusing any of the congenial friendliness common to the other cruise guests. They claimed to be Argentinean when other guests tried to engage them in English, but did not understand fluent Spanish when it was spoken to them. They had passports from Portugal, Norway, and Argentina; later, it was theorized that they were trying to maintain a cover story.

On Sunday, October 6, the Klinghoffers and friends celebrated Marilyn's fifty-eighth birthday.

On October 7, at Alexandria, Egypt, 651 of the passengers from the Achille Lauro left for a bus tour of the pyramids. They were to rendezvous with the ship fourteen hours later at Port Said, at the mouth of the Suez Canal, 150 miles to the east.

Passengers who had stayed aboard the Achille Lauro, such as Rene Sprecher, would later report watching a camera crew record what appeared to be people running on and off the ship firing guns with blanks. At the end of this, a car arrived, and a man took two wrapped packages from it, carrying them aboard ship. It was later theorized that this was how weapons were brought aboard.

== Hijacking ==
On Monday, October 7, 1985, four PLF militants hijacked Achille Lauro off Egypt. The exact circumstances of the hijacking remain disputed, with Abu Abbas claiming one version of events and the Italian courts later ruling it implausible.

=== Seizure of the ship ===
According to Abu Abbas, the original plan was for the PLF agents to use the ship as transport to attack a military installation in Ashdod, Israel. He explained that the four hid their weapons in the gas tank of a car parked in Italy in preparation for boarding the ship. Their smuggled weapons, still with gasoline residue on them, gave off a smell that the crew noticed but did not act on. Later, he claimed, a cabin steward entered the Palestinians' unlocked room to deliver complimentary fruits, surprising the four as they attempted to clean off their weapons. He explained that this led the agents to panic, put aside the original plan, and hijack the ship instead.

The Italian court later rejected Abbas's explanation, citing four inconsistencies. First, the hijackers offered contradictory accounts of the plan to attack Ashdod. Secondly, the stewards aboard the Achille Lauro all denied Abbas's story about walking in on the hijackers cleaning weapons. Third, the hijackers never shared any details about a planned attack on Ashdod until after the hijacking. Lastly, the court considered the timing of the hijacking too convenient, given that the vast majority of passengers had disembarked that morning, which left a much smaller crowd to control. The court ultimately concluded that Abbas had devised the attack on Ashdod as a retroactive cover story once the hijacking was unsuccessful.

The four terrorists stormed into the ship's dining room. They fired their automatic weapons over the heads of the eating passengers. Screams from the passengers meshed with the shouting of the gunmen and with the sound of falling glass shards and splinters. Viola Meskin tried to run to a door but was intercepted by a terrorist with a gun who turned her back. Austrian passenger Anna Hoeranter ran to an exit but was pushed down an adjacent flight of stairs by one of the terrorists. Other passengers ran in a panic from the dining room into the kitchen and were chased by one of the terrorists. Inside the kitchen, the pursuing terrorist beat two of the kitchen staff to the floor.

The ship's executive officer notified Captain Gerardo de Rosa that there were armed men on board, shooting at passengers. Captain De Rosa descended quickly through several decks, moving towards the ship's stern. An agitated voice came over the ship's loudspeakers requesting that he come immediately to the bridge. Arriving there, De Rosa was faced with machine guns. The terrorists fired some shots into the deck and then shouted in Arabic. They demanded he sail the ship 300 miles to the northeast, to the Syrian port of Tartus.

Due to most of the passengers having disembarked at Alexandria to tour the pyramids, only 97 remained on board and became hostages.

The hijackers rounded up the rest of the passengers aboard and herded them into the dining room. They missed Hoeranter, who, after having been pushed down the stairs by a terrorist, had entered the first open cabin she found and had hidden in the bathroom. She would remain there until found by the cleaning staff four days later (after the hijackers had left). She survived on two apples she had found and rationed.

The terrorists ordered Captain De Rosa to instruct the 450 crew members to continue with their normal duties but to stay clear of the hostages. They claimed to have a total of 20 hijackers on board. Only later would De Rosa and his officers discover that there were only four hijackers.

Within the dining room, the terrorists put on displays of power to intimidate the hostages, menacing them with their machine guns, and pulling the pins from their grenades but keeping the safety levers depressed. They had two of the women hostages hold the live grenades, causing the worry that if they fell asleep, the safety levers would detach, causing an explosion. The hijackers veered erratically from politeness to barbarity – one moment one would wash a cup for a hostage to use, the next a hijacker would ram a gun stock into Mrs. Klinghoffer to force her from the floor, then a hijacker would escort a captive to her cabin to change out of a wet swimsuit. The hijackers also tried to engage in some political persuasion, telling the hostages "Reagan no good, Arafat good."

Before the hijackers enforced radio silence, the crew of the Achille Lauro managed to send out an S.O.S. that was picked up by a monitoring facility in Sweden. This alerted the international community that Palestinians had seized an Italian ship.

As night approached, the hijackers took all the hostages up several decks to the Arazzi Lounge on the Promenade deck and gave them blankets to spend the night. While they ordered the ship's kitchen to send food up for the hostages, they placed containers they claimed were filled with gasoline around the room (apparently as a bluff to ward off the ship's crew). Despite fears of grenades and gasoline, the passengers attempted to sleep on the floor while the ship sailed for Syria.

The tourists who had visited the pyramids reached Port Said by 10:30 but found no ship. At first, they were told that traffic in the canal had delayed the ship, but at 1:30 a.m. were given the truth. Passengers began to worry.

=== Government reactions ===
Upon learning of the hijacking and that there were Americans on board, members of the Reagan administration in Washington, D.C., in a time zone seven hours behind Egypt's, moved to take decisive action. The Terrorist Incident Working Group (which included National Security Council staff member U.S. Marine Corps Lt. Col Oliver North) met in accord with predetermined counter-terrorist procedures. They recommended that a State Department Emergency Support Team be sent to Rome to assist the embassy there as the vessel was Italian. The Group also recommended that the Pentagon dispatch a team of special operations forces to Europe in case the ship needed to be seized to rescue the hostages. These recommendations were approved by the Operational Sub-Group chaired by John Poindexter and orders were sent to the State and Defense Departments. U.S. Army MG Carl Stiner put two platoons, drawn from the Navy's counter-terrorism unit SEAL Team Six, Army commandos from Delta Force, and Air Force Combat Controllers from BRAND X, en route to Europe to be operating with NATO ally permission from a British base at Akrotiri, Cyprus. The U.S. State Department asked countries along the Mediterranean to deny Achille Lauro access to their ports in order to keep it in international waters. They also sought to keep the press away from the ship to prevent giving the terrorists a worldwide stage.

The Italian Government took a mixed approach. Defense Minister Giovanni Spadolini had the military send 60 paratroopers, four helicopters, and experts on the ship's layout to the British base at Akrotiri. Prime Minister Bettino Craxi looked for a diplomatic solution beginning a near-continuous dialogue with every country involved, including the nations with citizens aboard, and the Arab states of Egypt, Syria, Jordan, and Tunisia.

Italy had called on the PLO to publicly declare whether they had any involvement. In response Yasser Arafat denounced the hijacking and offered to assist in negotiating for a peaceful conclusion to the incident. Arafat sent two men to Egypt to join a joint negotiating team alongside Italians and Egyptians – one of his advisors and PLO executive committee member Hani al-Hassan and Abu Abbas. At Port Said, Egypt, these two joined the PLO representative from Cairo – Zohdi al-Qoudra. (It is unknown if Arafat was ignorant of Abbas's involvement or if he was sent to ensure the incident would end quickly.)

=== Demands ===
On the morning of Tuesday, October 8, the hijackers began to separate the hostages. They were looking for Jews and Americans, asking for the hostages to identify themselves but meeting refusal. They collected the passports of the passengers and pulled aside 12 Americans and six female British dancers who had been hired as entertainers (originally set to perform in the very lounge they were being held hostage in). Looking at the passports of an elderly couple, the hijackers asked if they were Jewish. Upon hearing that they were, one of the terrorists knocked the man to the floor and repeatedly hit him with the butt of his gun.

The terrorists ordered the 20 separated passengers up the stairs but Leon Klinghoffer's wheelchair could not make the climb and his wife Marilyn refused to abandon him. She was ordered by the terrorists to leave him, when she protested they put a machine gun to her head and ordered her up the stairs. Fellow passenger Anna Scheider offered to take Mr. Klinghoffer but was refused, with one of the hijackers saying "You go! We will take care of him."

On Lido Deck, below the bridge and above the lounge the other hostages were being held on, the separated hostages were forced to lie on the deck. Containers said to contain fuel were placed around them with threats from the terrorists that they would shoot the cans if provoked. One of the terrorists told hostage Evelyn Weltman that if commandos tried a rescue all the hostages would be executed. At this point it became clear to the hostages and Captain De Rosa that one of the four hijackers was their leader – twenty-three year-old Youssef Majed Molqi (recruited by Abbas from a crowded Palestinian refugee camp in Jordan).

The Achille Lauro arrived off Tartus at 11:00 a.m. and Molqi broke radio silence. He asked Syrian authorities to allow him to dock the ship at Tartus and demanded that they send someone from the International Red Cross to the ship, along with British and American representatives. He stated that he was with the PLF and demanded that the Israeli Government be contacted and given the demand that 50 Palestinians held in its jails be freed, including specifically Samir Kuntar.

If the prisoners were not released, Molqi said they would begin killing hostages, "We will start executing at 3:00 p.m. sharp." Syria, having consulted with the U.S. and Italian governments, did not respond to any of the demands.

=== Murder of Leon Klinghoffer ===
As 3:00 p.m. neared, the terrorists began to decide whom to kill by shuffling the U.S., British, and Austrian hostages' passports. They selected Leon Klinghoffer to be killed first, to be followed by Mildred Hodes.

Several reasons have been put forward that may have contributed to why Klinghoffer was chosen. Earlier in the hijacking, he had refused to be silent when gunmen took his watch and cigarettes, becoming brusque and complaining in his slurred speech, which antagonized some of the hijackers, though one of them gave Klinghoffer his possessions back. Additionally Klinghoffer was Jewish and American, and his wheelchair made him both hard to move around the ship and meant his extended absence from the main group was less likely to trigger a chain reaction of resistance among the surviving hostages. Molqi later gave a statement on why he was chosen: "I and Bassm [al-Ashker] agreed that the first hostage to be killed had to be an American. I chose Klinghoffer, an invalid, so that they would know that we had no pity for anyone, just as the Americans, arming Israel, do not take into consideration that Israel kills women and children of our people."

Molqi ordered Manuel de Souza, a Portuguese waiter, to accompany him and push Klinghoffer outside onto the open deck. Klinghoffer was taken back along the entire deck of the ship to the stern. Molqi ordered Souza to return into the ship.

The other terrorists moved the rest of the hostages back down into the lounge. Marilyn Klinghoffer noticed that Leon was not there and began to weep. A hijacker told her that he had been moved to the ship's infirmary due to illness.

Molqi shot Leon Klinghoffer once in the head and again in the chest. He died instantly, toppling onto his face. Molqi then went in and ordered Souza to throw the body over the side of the ship. When Souza was unable to do the task alone, Molqi found Italian hairdresser Ferruccio Alberti and forced the two of them at gunpoint to throw the body and then the wheelchair into the sea. Several of the hostages heard the shots and splashes, including Marilyn Klinghoffer. She pleaded with the hijackers to let her see her husband in the infirmary, but they refused. She feared the worst but remained hopeful.

Molqi, with blood splattered clothing, returned to the other terrorists and told them "I have killed the American." He and Bassam al-Ashker then went to the bridge. Handing Klinghoffer's passport to Captain De Rosa, he raised a finger and said "boom, boom." He then handed Mrs. Hodes' passport to him and said "This will be the second one." At that point, De Rosa told them they could kill him instead of the passengers.

Molqi ordered De Rosa to tell the Syrians that a passenger had been killed and that they were prepared to kill another. The Syrians responded by telling Molqi to "go back where you came from." Finding no help in Syria, Molqi ordered De Rosa to sail for Libya.

== Negotiations ==
In an effort to resolve the situation, communications with the hijackers and discussions about their fate took place.

=== Abbas' interaction ===
Before Achille Lauro could head towards Libya, Abbas, unable to contact the ship using Egyptian Naval communications, called into Cyprus' Arabic language station Radio Monte Carlo. He, using the name "Abu Khaled", asked the station to broadcast a message to the vessel, instructing the hijackers to return immediately to Port Said and treat the passengers "kindly." Molqi on the bridge with Captain De Rosa was listening to the station and became overjoyed, ordering the captain to set course for Port Said at 7:20 p.m., Tuesday, October 8. Following the instructions of Abbas, the Achille Lauro headed back towards Port Said, where it had previously made a tourist stop.

Abbas, still using the name "Abu Khaled," was later able to contact the ship by naval radio from Port Said. Abbas told Majed to treat the passengers well and to apologize to them, the crew, and the captain. He told Majed to tell them that their objective was not to take control of the ship and that their friendship with Italy was "so important that it is unthinkable that any action would be taken against our European friends."

Abbas then spoke to Captain De Rosa; he apologized to him, saying, "We are truly sorry, because we didn't intend to hijack you, but our situation was such that we had to assume control for several hours." De Rosa replied "I am familiar with your situation and I understand it well. We understand the Palestinians, we understand the Palestinian aspirations, and for that reason we are all with you." The radio contact allowed the International community to pinpoint the location of the vessel. The Israelis were able to provide information about Abbas' radio discussions with the ship to the Reagan administration and notified them that it was Abbas' faction behind the hijacking. Fearing that the terrorists’ threat to kill passengers had been followed through, and not wanting a repeat of the TWA Flight 847 terrorist incident where the administration looked impotent to act, the American special forces staged in Cyprus were ordered to make preparations to storm the vessel.

=== Government discussions ===
That afternoon, Maxwell M. Rabb, U.S. ambassador to Italy, advised Prime Minister Craxi of the U.S. intention to mount a military assault on the vessel, after Italy had already weighed taking the same action. Craxi protested, saying the ship was Italian, and therefore only Italy should act and that there was no confirmation of any killings. He maintained that negotiations for the release of the ship seemed possible. He relayed that in response to his inquires the Egyptians had told him that no one had been killed. The Egyptian Government began to conduct negotiations through the medium of PLO representative Muhammad "Abu" Abbas.

By Tuesday evening, the PLO began seeking to have the hijackers turned over to them should they surrender. Arafat had Abbas communicate to Italian Prime Minister Craxi that the hijackers promised to release unharmed all the passengers and to drop demands for the release of prisoners. Arafat, through Abbas, also got Egyptian President Hosni Mubarak to pledge to turn over the hijackers to the PLO in Tunis for prosecution.

The PLF issued a statement from Nicosia, Cyprus, apologizing to the passengers for the hijacking, "The aim of the operation was not to hijack the ship or its passengers, or any civilian of any nationality. The operation was likewise not aimed against states that are friendly to our people and their cause. ... [The mission was to] travel on an ordinary sea journey to Ashdod harbor in occupied Palestine, from where our comrades were to proceed to a specified Israeli military target, as a reply to the war of extermination and terrorism against them and to avenge the martyrs of the Israeli raid on Tunis. Our comrades were compelled to take control of the ship before reaching the specified target. We wish to mention that the course toward Arab ports was the result of the situation and the confusion into which the squad fell."

At 7:30 a.m. Wednesday, October 9, the Achille Lauro anchored off Port Said. While the hostages remained in the lounge, a small boat approached the ship. Molqi descended to speak with the new arrivals which included Abu Abbas and Hani al-Hassan.

Speaking with the support of both the Egyptian and Italian officials, Abbas and Hassan began talking to the hijackers – giving the appearance of real negotiations. The PLO hailed the incident as successful negotiations and took credit for it. Hassan notified Arafat of the talk and Arafat called Italian Prime Minister Craxi midday Wednesday. Arafat told him that the hijackers would release the captives if two demands were met, that the ambassadors from U.S., Italy, West Germany, and Great Britain visit the ship, then the hijackers be given safe passage off the ship.

Italian ambassador Giovanni Migliuolo asked the other ambassadors to accompany him on a helicopter flight to Port Said in order to speak to the hijackers. U.S. ambassador to Egypt Nicholas A. Veliotes refused, saying it would give the hijackers the media platform they wanted and that more importantly the U.S. policy was not to negotiate with terrorists.

While the diplomats were reviewing their options the Egyptian foreign minister Abdel Meguid telephoned and asked them to report to his office. There he proposed a new offer – the hostages would be released if the four governments promised not to pursue the hijackers. The ambassadors told him that they could not commit to that without consulting with their governments. Meguid loaned each an office and telephone. He demanded an answer in twenty minutes, the ambassadors ignored his deadline and began discussing the matter with their governments. The American and British ambassadors informed Meguid that their governments refused, repeating their policies of not negotiating with terrorists.

By Wednesday morning, the Reagan administration had implemented a plan for the Achille Lauro to be liberated by the U.S. military that evening. SEAL Team Six embarked on board the USS Iwo Jima (LPH-2) an amphibious assault ship which then steamed for Port Said. It was decided that the raid would go ahead as long as the ship was in international waters, but would be put on hold if it was found in Egyptian waters.

At mid-afternoon Wednesday, a ship-to-shore radio broadcast was made by Captain De Rosa, "I am the captain. I am speaking from my office, and my officers and everybody is in good health". It was later discovered that De Rosa had made this false claim because Molqi was holding a gun to his head.

=== Hijackers disembark ===
Citing De Rosa's broadcast the Egyptian foreign minister met again with the four ambassadors urging them to accept a transfer of the hijackers to PLO control rather than seeking their arrest. Veliotes refused, holding that even without any murders the terrorists must be arrested for the hijacking itself. The British ambassador also refused to sign off on the proposal. The Italian ambassador embraced the agreement, and the West German ambassador offered general but undefined support. The split positions was enough for the Egyptian government, and Foreign Minister Meguid informed Abbas and Hassan that the hijackers could leave the ship. Captain De Rosa told the passengers that the Palestinians had told him to relay an apology and the message that they had never intended to hijack the ship, "They had an assignment to do something in Israel."

At 5:00 p.m., the four Palestinian hijackers left the ship being taken ashore by the Egyptians in a tugboat. The terrorists waved goodbye to the former hostages, who applauded in relief at finding themselves freed. A crowd of Egyptian civilians ashore burst into cheers for the hijackers as they came into view of land, "Fedayeen, fedayeen, Allah akbar!" ("The guerrillas, the guerrillas, God is great!"). British journalist Robert Fisk reported from the shore that one could see a streak down the side of the vessel, which turned out to be Klinghoffer's blood.

As soon as the hijackers left the ship Marilyn Klinghoffer rushed to the infirmary looking for Leon. Not finding him the staff informed her to ask the captain who was still on the bridge. Klinghoffer climbed the steps on the infirmary's level – near the bottom of the ship, all the way to the bridge – near the top of the vessel. Captain De Rosa informed her of her husband's murder. Klinghoffer collapsed, sobbing uncontrollably, and friends helped her to her cabin.

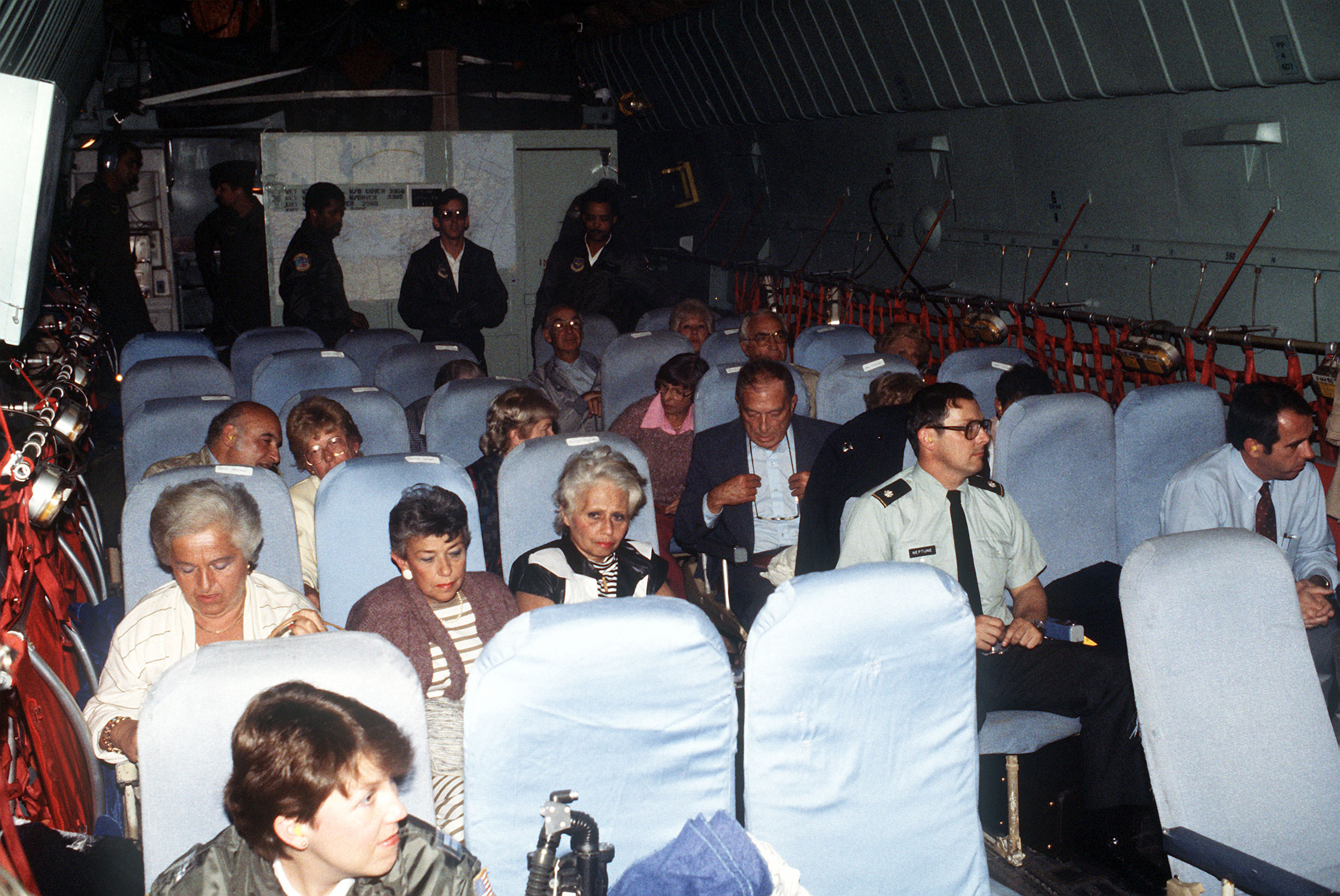
Freed hostages from Achille Lauro returning to the US by military aircraft

De Rosa received a call from Italian Foreign Minister Giulio Andreotti in Rome. He confirmed that he had regained control of the ship but inexplicably relayed that all of the passengers were well. Andreotti informed Craxi, who was about to hold a press conference, on the successful conclusion of the situation. Craxi decided that it was best to double check the condition of the passengers and called De Rosa who finally admitted the murder of Leon Klinghoffer. Craxi altered his prepared remarks and at the news conference the world learned from him of the murder for the first time. The Klinghoffers’ daughters and friends in New York had been celebrating the previous news which claimed all the hostages were safe, but were contacted by the New York Times which had a reporter at the Craxi press conference. Informed of the death of their father and friend, their joy turned into despair.

American ambassador Nicholas Veliotes boarded the Achille Lauro to confirm Craxi's information about Klinghoffer's death. He found De Rosa distraught, learned that Molqi had held the gun to his head during the ship-to-shore communication that claimed all the hostages were healthy. De Rosa in tears handed the ambassador Klinghoffer's passport. Veliotes called the American embassy with the ship-to-shore radio to give orders "Leon Klinghoffer was murdered by the terrorists off of Tartus when they were trying to get the attention of the Syrians. In my name, I want you to call the [Egyptian] foreign minister, tell him what we learned, tell him the circumstances, tell him in view of this and the fact that we – and presumably them – didn't have those facts, we insist that they prosecute those sons of bitches."

The American passengers of the Achille Lauro, having been held hostage for 51 hours, were taken by a U.S. military aircraft back to the United States on October 12, 1985. The aircraft had flown out of Rhein-Main Air Base, West Germany, and stopped there for refueling during the flight to the United States from Egypt.

=== Hijackers in Egypt ===
With the hijackers on Egyptian soil and the knowledge of Klinghoffer's murder revealed, different state actors put forward their position on what should be done. Italy's position was that the ship being Italian, it was legally Italian territory and therefore the hijackers should be extradited to Italy. Israel demanded that the hijackers be prosecuted, Benjamin Netanyahu (its representative to the United Nations) declared "Klinghoffer and his wife were singled out for one thing – because they were Jewish."

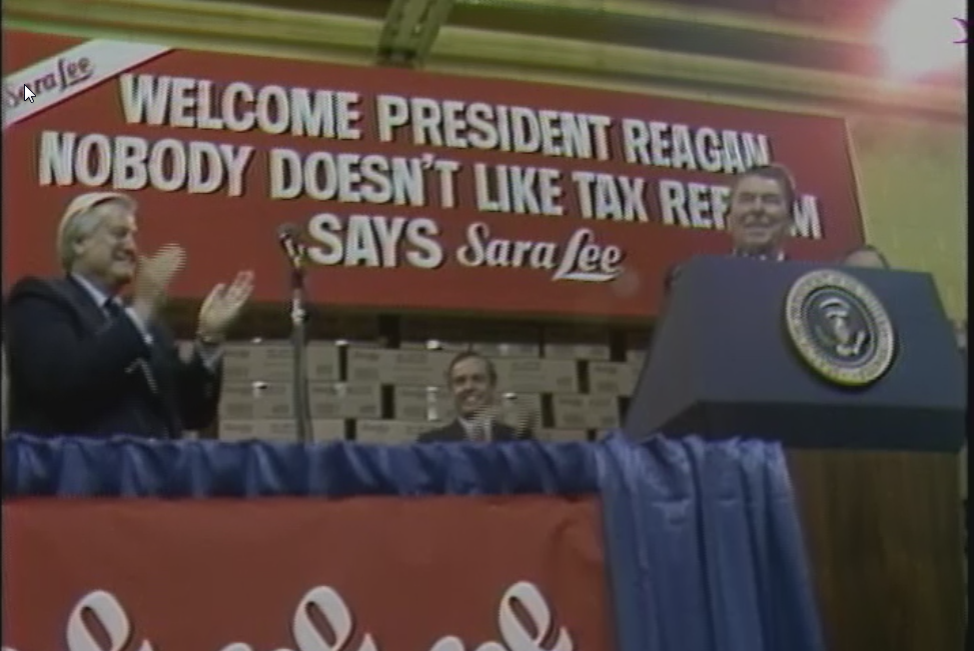
Ronald Reagan speaks at Sara Lee

On Thursday, October 10, 1985, U.S. President Reagan, while on a tour promoting his tax-overhaul plan, at a planeside news conference at O'Hare International Airport, told reporters it would be "all right" for the PLO if Arafat has "kind of a national court set up, like a nation that they can bring them to justice." The President's aides realized that this would be tantamount to recognizing the PLO as a legitimate government which would be a reversal of the current policy that named it as a terrorist organization. At the next stop, national security affairs adviser Robert "Bud" McFarlane told the press that Reagan "meant that he wants the PLO to turn these hijackers over to competent authority for trial." Minutes later, and less than an hour after his initial comments, Reagan held another question-and-answer session with the press, saying "I really believe that the PLO, if the hijackers are in their custody, should turn them over to a sovereign state that would have jurisdiction and could prosecute them as the murderers they are." Administration officials (implying that the hijackers were also guilty of piracy) said the president's position was complicated due to uncertainty if the pirates had been released to the PLO or were still in Egypt. Later speaking to reporters at a stop to tour the kitchens of Sara Lee, Reagan said on the issue "apparently there's a little confusion, and maybe I'm responsible." He said he had "not meant to imply" that the PLO should try the hijackers.

When Abbas had ordered the hijackers to return the ship to Port Said, and the ship's captain had radioed Egyptian port officials – the problem fell onto Egypt's President Hosni Mubarak. The Egyptian government had competing interests he was attempting to balance. Mubarak wanted to maintain Egypt's peace treaty with Israel, the 1978 Camp David Accords, but also keep good relations with its fellow Arab states in the Middle East. The Israeli bombing of the PLO's Tunis headquarters the previous week had left many innocent Tunisians killed or wounded, adding to the pressures on Mubarak. He also wanted to maintain good relations with the US to not jeopardize billions of dollars in foreign aid.

Mubarak decided to try to get the hijackers out of Egypt quickly. He thought this would work because of the recent previous precedent where the U.S. had "made no claims on the hijackers" of the TWA airliner earlier that summer. Additionally President Reagan had told the media that it would be "all right" if the PLO put the hijackers on trial. Mubarak's main impetus for his decision was Captain De Rosa's false report of no casualties. The Egyptian government had intervened solely for humanitarian reasons to secure the release of the hostages and the vessel. Egypt had no normal basis for jurisdiction as the ship was of Italian registry, carried no Egyptian passengers, none of the hijackers were Egyptian, and their actions were outside Egyptian territorial limits. The Egyptian government decided to honor its agreement to allow the Palestinians access to a plane to travel to a place of safety.

The Egyptian government had given PLO officials in Tunisia 48 hours to take control of the four hijackers in Egypt. Arafat had told the Egyptians that he needed time to find a nation that they could take the four for trial. If the PLO could not find a cooperative nation, Egypt would release the men or turn them over to Italy. The PLO did not feel anxious about the agreement, one of its officials saying "Italy is a friend of ours, so it's no problem." The PLO also asserted that the four were not PLO members but only a part of the PLF. Some in the international community, such as the US, held that this was a common tactic by Arafat. Holding that when one of the PLO's constituent groups committed an act of violence, he would claim that the group was rebelling from PLO control and beyond his control or influence.

PLO official Farouk Kaddoumi also said that the claim that Klinghoffer had been murdered was "a big lie fabricated by the intelligence service of the United States". At a United Nations meeting in New York, he suggested to the UN Security Council that Klinghoffer might have died naturally, "Is there any evidence that those hijackers had killed the civilian? Where is the evidence?"

The Reagan administration sent a series of urgent messages to Cairo, urging the Egyptians to swiftly turn over the hijackers for prosecution either to Italy or the US. Reagan approved of a draft message to be sent on his personal behalf to Mubarak stating the same was to be delivered by Ambassador Veliotes. Apparently seeking to avoid having to lie directly to the Americans, Mubarak refused to see Veliotes and also refused to take calls from U.S. Secretary of State George Shultz.

On October 11, the day after the hijackers had disembarked the ship, Mubarak lied to the media when asked about them saying they had left within hours of coming ashore, "They have actually left Egypt. I do not know exactly where they have gone. Perhaps they have left for Tunisia." His foreign Minister Esmat Abdel Meguid reiterated the same message "They left Egypt. I know where they are, but I am not going to tell you." Mubarak would also falsely insist that the hijackers had left Egypt before he had information about Captain De Rosa's correction, "If the captain had told us that a passenger had been killed, we would have changed our position toward the whole operation. But when this [news of the murder] emerged, we already had sent the hijackers out of the country." Mubarak also repeated the suggestion that no one had been killed "There is no body and no proof he has been murdered. Maybe the man is hiding or did not board the ship at all." At the time of Mubarak's statements to the news media, the U.S. Administration had already received intelligence information that the hijackers were still in Egypt.

== Interception of EgyptAir Flight 2843 ==
Learning of the murder of a U.S. citizen, fearing the escape of the hijackers, and desiring a victory over terrorism, the Reagan administration ordered the EgyptAir passenger jet carrying the hijackers out of Egypt to be forced to land so the perpetrators could be brought to justice.

=== Planning ===
On the morning of Thursday, October 10, 1985, Oliver North had contacted Israeli Major General Uri Simhoni, the military attaché at the Israeli embassy in Washington. (Simhoni had been helpful in giving information that helped locate the Achille Lauro during the hijacking.) He relayed to North that the four hijackers were at the Almaza Air Base near Cairo. Later that morning American sources confirmed the information and added that the Egyptians were planning to transport the men out of the country at night, presumably to Tunis, aboard a commercial EgyptAir jet. James R. Stark realized that due to ongoing disputes that Egypt had with Libya and Chad that the plane would most likely fly over the Mediterranean sea which raised the option of intercepting it with U.S. Navy fighters. Stark recalled that during World War II, American fighters had acted on intelligence to intercept Japanese Admiral Isoroku Yamamoto and advocated a similar action (with a forced landing rather than shooting the aircraft down). Due to anticipated political problems, the idea of forcing the plane to land in either Israel or Cyprus was dismissed. The Italian air base in Sigonella, Italy, where the U.S. had long maintained a naval air station, was chosen.

North and Stark passed the idea onto John Poindexter who agreed with it and called Robert McFarlane who was traveling with Reagan to run the idea past the President. Reagan, speaking with employees of Chicago's Sara Lee bakery, was informed of the option along with potential problems (such as finding the correct EgyptAir jet and possibly damaging relations with Egypt and Italy).

A desire for successful assertive action against terrorism in the Reagan administration was further spurred by the memory of the political cost borne by President Jimmy Carter for a lack of the same (his inability to free American hostages seized by student demonstrators in Iran was held to have been a major factor in his failed 1980 reelection bid). Despite covert Central Intelligence Agency (CIA) searches, the Reagan administration had also been frustrated in its inability to find American hostages held in the Lebanon hostage crisis that had begun in 1982, nor had they had an opportunity for decisive action in the recent TWA hijacking.

After listening to the idea of intercepting the EgyptAir jet, Reagan approved the operation in principle in what was called the "Sara Lee decision". Reagan's decision style was to reflect the broad-brush issues and leave details to his staff, and Poindexter was tasked with fulfilling the president's decision. North was to remain in contact with Simhoni for any situational changes regarding the hijackers. Poindexter called Vice Admiral Art Moreau (then serving as assistant to Admiral William J. Crowe – the chairman of the Joint Chiefs of Staff). Poindexter, on behalf of the president, told Moreau that Crowe was to start planning an intercept mission.

Communications for planning began between the Pentagon, U.S. military headquarters in Europe, and the Navy's Sixth Fleet. Progress on difficulties (such as how to force the airliner to land or if weapons could be fired in warning) proceeded quickly, largely due to a lack of criticism from Secretary of Defense Caspar Weinberger, who had developed a reputation for objecting to "incidental" use of armed forces. Upon learning of the idea while traveling in Ottawa, Canada, Weinberger objected, telling Crowe on a phone call "That's a terrible idea. I'm dead set against it, interfering with a civilian aircraft. We'll be castigated all over the world." He told Crowe to "stop everything" and then called President Reagan in Air Force One to argue against the idea. Speaking to the president on an open, unencrypted radio channel Weinberger listed reasons to abort the plan. This discussion later became public because it was monitored by a ham radio operator. The operator revealed to the press that Reagan had not been convinced by his defense secretary and ordered him to make it happen.

The final go-ahead was given by Reagan late that afternoon while returning to Washington on Air Force One. McFarlane contacted Poindexter who alerted the Pentagon. Orders were sent across the Atlantic to the aircraft carrier USS Saratoga and her aircraft made ready for the intercept.

On October 10, 1985, the four hijackers boarded an EgyptAir Boeing 737 accompanied by Abu Abbas, Ozzuddin Badrakkan (also called Mohammed Oza – he served as chief of PLF military operations and was a PLO official), and several members of Egypt's counterterrorism unit Force 777. The flight was set to fly to Tunisia, which was where the PLF headquarters were located. The airliner took off from Cairo at 4:15 p.m. EST.

=== Search for Flight 2843 ===
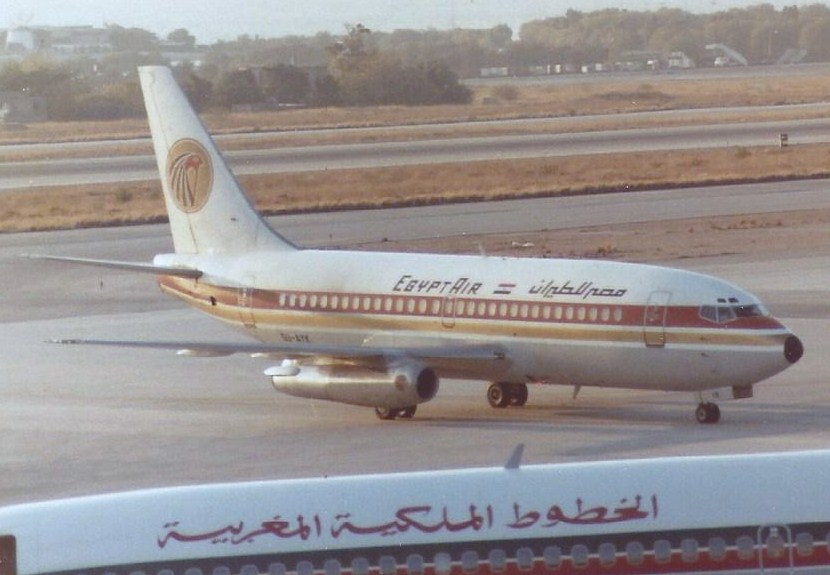
SU-AYK, the Boeing 737 that hijackers boarded

The Saratoga was the flagship of a Sixth Fleet task force commanded by Rear Admiral David E. Jeremiah. It had just finished participating in a NATO exercise and was headed for Dubrovnik, Yugoslavia, when late in the evening it received the orders from commander of the Sixth Fleet, Vice Admiral Frank Kelso, and reversed course along with the rest of its group.

The Saratoga had been following the news of the Achille Lauro and had earlier tried to help locate it by dispatching aircraft, but the new orders came as a surprise to Jeremiah. He was to locate and intercept a commercial jet with the hijackers onboard coming out of Egypt but he did not know what time, which jet, nor its origin. Jeremiah sent out F-14 Tomcat fighters along with an E-2C Hawkeye early-warning aircraft which carried a special radar that allowed its crew to track all aircraft within hundreds of miles. The operation would only be successful if the Hawkeye's crew could find the Egyptian airliner.

The Saratoga launched several planes from Carrier Air Wing 17 (CVW-17) – four Grumman F-14 Tomcats (two belonging to VF-74 Be-Devilers and two belonging to VF-103 Sluggers), one Northrop Grumman E-2 Hawkeye (belonging to VAW-125 Tiger Tails), two Grumman A-6 Intruders (belonging to VA-85 Black Falcons) and one Northrop Grumman EA-6B Prowler (belonging to VAQ-137 Rooks). Additionally, another E-2C, three more F-14s and two electronic intelligence aircraft (a Boeing RC-135 and a Douglas A-3 Skywarrior) joined the mission. The flight operation was planned by Robert "Bubba" Brodzky.

Before the Tomcats could be launched they had to have their radar-guided missiles removed and simpler weapons, including tracer bullets, installed. Around this time, Israeli intelligence agents found that the plane carrying the hijackers was an EgyptAir Boeing 737, flight 2843. They also determined its tail number and departure time. The information was passed onto Oliver North, relayed to the Pentagon, who relayed it to the Sixth Fleet, who relayed it to the Saratoga. The Hawkeye crew received the information before taking off.

Ralph Zia, commanding officer of the Hawkeye, monitored the airways designated for commercial jets focusing on a converge point south of Crete. He and his crew tracked radar contacts flying west out of Egypt, presumably towards Tunisia. Zia had to send a Tomcat to visually determine if the contact was an EgyptAir 737, as there was no sensor that would confirm the exact identity of each radar blip. The fighter jets were commanded to perform the operation with lights out.

Steve Weatherspoon, one of the Tomcat fighter pilots later recalled that the nighttime intercepts were not overly difficult. "It wasn't a big deal. We got a good radar picture that safely controlled the intercept, and pulled close enough to get a visual identification. As we slowly closed, either we illuminated the aircraft with the glow of our exterior position lights or tried to make out a silhouette by starlight. If its shape was similar to a 737, we had to get closer to see the carrier or national markings."

Two of the blips checked on by the Tomcats were U.S. Air Force Lockheed C-141 Starlifter transport planes flying without lights. They were carrying Major General Stiner and his special operations troops who had been set to storm the Achille Lauro. They were now being moved to Sigonella to capture the hijackers should the Navy jets succeed at their mission.

After approaching between six and eight aircraft without finding the airliner, Weatherspoon and the pilot of the other Tomcat (William Roe "Skid" Massey) were instructed by Zia to approach another aircraft. Massey saw that the plane was a 737, his Radar Intercept Officer in the backseat, Dennis "Doc" Plautz, saw that it had an EgyptAir logo. Shining a flashlight on the fuselage they made out the tail number "SU-AYK" (Massey was able to close to within 15 feet of the Boeing 737 to read its registration). A radio call to the Saratoga confirmed that this was the correct plane. The time was 5:30 p.m. EST.

=== Interception ===
Unknowingly being shadowed by Tomcats, the EgyptAir Boeing 737 sought permission to land at Tunis but was refused. A request for permission to land at Athens was also refused.

The Hawkeye had directed additional Tomcats to close with the airliner, and it began to communicate with the Boeing 737 on a VHF frequency demanding it divert to Sigonella, Italy. When the pilot of the EgyptAir Boeing 737 refused to comply, the Hawkeye gave the command to the Tomcats "Lights on, now!" With the illumination of the American aircraft, the Egyptian pilot suddenly realized he was surrounded by warplanes. The Hawkeye relayed to the Boeing that one way or another they must reach Sigonella. The Egyptian pilot later reported that the American fighter pilots had ordered him to comply with their commands or be shot down. He also stated that the military jets were in such close proximity that he had to request that they give him more room to safely maneuver.

The airliner, flying wing-to-wing with several of the Tomcats, complied with the order to divert to Sigonella, touching down at 6:45 p.m. EST.

The American position had hardened with news of the murder and it was ascertained that the PLO did not have plans to try the terrorists, rather they were being flown to a place of asylum. It was further discovered that the negotiator, Abbas, had actually been the mastermind behind the hijacking. This discovery also threw Arafat's claims of authority within a fractious PLO into question for the Americans and raised questions of his own culpability. Reagan viewed Egypt's allowing the terrorists safe passage to asylum as an unfriendly act when he had ordered the US military to intercept the Egyptian plane.

=== Securing the airliner ===
Minutes after the 737 touched down, two United States Air Force C-141 cargo planes landed with counter terrorist members of SEAL Team Six who quickly surrounded the airplane at the airstrip as it came to a halt. The Seals were prepared to assault the aircraft and secure the terrorists. With the 737 safely on the ground in Sigonella the Navy warplanes had closed the airspace overhead for all incoming aircraft.

Stiner called the Egyptian pilot on the radio, telling him that his plane was now in the custody of the US military. The pilot informed Stiner that an Egyptian ambassador was aboard and wanted to speak with him. A ladder was lowered from the forward door and the pilot, Captain Amed Moneeb, descended followed by Egyptian diplomat Zeid Imad Hamed. SEAL Team Six commanding officer Robert A. Gormly met them and examined Hamed's credentials. Finding them in order, he escorted Hamed into the base and let him phone Egypt's foreign minister.

Stiner then boarded the plane with an officer from SEAL Team Six. They found the four terrorists, Abbas, and Badrakkan onboard being guarded by ten commandos of the Egyptian Army's elite Unit 777. Though Stiner had orders to arrest the terrorists, he made no attempt to do so at that time.

== Sigonella crisis ==
Sigonella was an Italian Air Force base in Sicily, which housed a U.S. Navy installation (N.A.S.). The American special forces had surrounded the airplane, but soon found themselves surrounded by Italian Air Force soldiers and Carabinieri (Italian military police). The Italian organizations insisted that Italy had territorial rights over the base and jurisdiction over the hijackers. A standoff between the SEAL team and the Italian military began.

The choice of the Sigonella base to divert the EgyptAir 737 that had the hijackers of the Achille Lauro aboard caused a dispute between the governments of the US and Italy and included elements of their militaries.

=== Jurisdiction dispute ===
On the orders of U.S. president Ronald Reagan and secretary of defense Caspar Weinberger, the Egyptian airliner carrying the hijackers was intercepted by F-14 Tomcats from the VF-74 "BeDevilers" and the VF-103 "Sluggers" of Carrier Air Wing 17, based on the aircraft carrier USS Saratoga, and directed to land at Naval Air Station Sigonella (an Italian NATO air base in Sicily under joint Italian-American military utilization).

The choice of Sigonella became problematic for the Americans as they had no jurisdiction, and the Italians were not consulted regarding its use for this operation.

The Egyptian flight, having been authorized by its government, was lawful under international law. The Egyptian government protested the American interception of its plane, which was not legal under international law. Egypt's arguments were somewhat diminished by its own previous justification for its 1978 raid at Locna airport in Cyprus. Not only had the Americans not received consent from the Italians to forcibly land a non-hostile plane flying in compliance with international law at Sigonella, but the American military action was taken solely for American purposes (not those of the NATO alliance) and was taken in order to secure criminals – this was in violation of the purely joint military purposes that the Italians had agreed to when deciding to share the utilization of the base.

=== Armed standoff ===
A standoff occurred when 20 Carabinieri and 30 VAM (Vigilanza Aeronautica Militare) of the Italian Air Force contested for control of the plane with the 80 armed operatives of the U.S. Delta Force and SEAL Team Six. These contesting groups were soon surrounded by 300 additional armed Carabinieri who had also blocked off the runway with their trucks. The VAM personnel and Carabinieri had already been lining up facing the US special forces soon after the American's main contingent had arrived by C-141s. Other Carabinieri had been sent from Catania and Syracuse as reinforcement. These events became known as the Sigonella Crisis.

Stiner and Gormly contacted the Pentagon to inform them of the situation, and this information was passed onto the Reagan Administration. Members of the president's staff told the Italian government that the US special-operations team intended to arrest the hijackers. The Italians dismissed the Americans' claim of the right to do so, maintaining that the matter fell within their own jurisdiction due to the ship sailing under an Italian flag.

A phone call took place between President Reagan and Prime Minister Craxi, with the latter claiming Italian territorial rights over the NATO base. Reagan informed Craxi that the US would seek extradition of the terrorists to face charges in US courts.

Stiner and his men, standing eyeball-to-eyeball with the 360 armed Italians, relayed to the Pentagon "I am not worried about our situation. We have the firepower to prevail. But I am concerned about the immaturity of the Italian troops... A backfire from a motorbike or a construction cart could precipitate a shooting incident that could lead to a lot of Italian casualties. And I don't believe that our beef is with our ally, the Italians, but rather with the terrorists." The American leadership in Washington concluded that while Stiner and his men could take the terrorists it was unlikely they would be able to get them out of Italy. By 4:00 a.m. CET the next day, orders arrived for Stiner and his men to stand down.

After five hours of negotiations, and with the knowledge that the Italian troops had orders (confirmed by President Francesco Cossiga) to use lethal force if necessary to block the Americans from leaving with prisoners, the U.S. conceded the Italian claim of jurisdiction over the terrorists. The Americans received assurances that the hijackers would be tried for murder and Stiner and three US officials were to remain at the airport to witness the arrest of the terrorists by Italian authorities.

=== Talks between Italy and Egypt ===
After the U.S. turned over control of the 737 to Italy, Egyptian diplomat Hamed returned to the plane with Italian base commander Colonel Annicchiarico. Hamed told the men of Unit 777 that the Egyptian government had agreed to turn over the hijackers to the Italians. Both Abbas and Badrakkan refused to leave the plane claiming diplomatic rights – maintaining that they had diplomatic immunity as representatives of the PLO and Arafat. Learning of this the Egyptian government changed its position, declaring that the two were on board an Egyptian aircraft on a government mission – thus accruing extraterritorial rights. Egypt requested Italy let the plane leave with the two men on board as they had been brought to Italy against their will. When the Italians refused this demand the Egyptians denied Achille Lauro permission to leave Port Said.

Prime Minister Craxi sent his personal foreign affairs advisor Antonio Badini to interview Abbas after boarding the airliner. Abbas' account held he had been sent by Arafat due to his persuasive argumentation style, that the four Palestinians had been triggered by panic to stage the hijacking, and that the decisive role in releasing the passengers was his alone. Craxi appeared at a press conference late on Friday, October 11, acknowledging the role the two played in ending the hijacking, but inviting them to provide "useful testimony" and turning the matter over to the Italian court system.

After continued talks between Italy and Egypt, the four hijackers were eventually removed from the 737, arrested by the Italian Carabinieri at Sigonella, and taken to the air base jail, then transferred to a local prison. The public magistrate in Syracuse announced late on the 11th that his inquires were complete and EgyptAir 2843 could depart for Rome with Badrakkan and Abbas aboard. Craxi saw this as a stalling tactic that was a courtesy to the U.S. The Italian foreign ministry contacted the U.S. embassy and informed them of the flight, saying that the two wanted to consult with the PLO office in Rome. The Americans viewed this as a prelude to Abbas being released. The 737 was then cleared by the Italians to fly to Rome's Ciampino airport with Abbas and Badrakkan still aboard.

=== Jet fighter showdown ===
U.S. Major General Stiner, in command of the American Special Operations Forces at Sigonella, upon learning that the 737 had been cleared by the Italians to proceed to Rome with members of the PLF still on board, became concerned that there was no guarantee that once airborne it would travel to Rome rather than back to Cairo. He boarded a T-39 Navy executive jet (the North American Sabreliner) with other American Special Operations personnel and planned to shadow the 737. When the Egyptian airliner took off from Sigonella at 10:00 p.m. the T-39 was not granted clearance from that runway. In response the Americans used a parallel runway without Italian permission.

In response to the unauthorized act by Stiner and the Americans, the Italian Air Force sent in two Aeritalia F-104S Starfighter warplanes of the 36° Stormo (Wing) from Gioia del Colle. These were soon joined by two more F-104s from Grazzanise airbase. In response to the Italian action, other warplanes (that have never been publicly identified but are assumed to have been American F-14 Tomcats) came up behind the Italian jets. The Italian jets also found their radar jammed above the Tyrrhenian Sea, apparently by a U.S. Northrop Grumman EA-6B Prowler. National Security Council staffer Michael K. Bohn in the White House Situation Room at the time, later recalled "Pilots on board the U.S. and Italian jets exchanged colorful epithets over the radio about their respective intentions, family heritage, and sexual preferences." Once the 737 approached Rome, the formation of U.S. Naval fighters, turned back – only the T-39 with U.S. special operations forces continued to Ciampino airport.

The Italian air-traffic controllers at Ciampino denied the T-39 permission to land, but the US pilot claimed there was an "inflight emergency" which gave him an automatic right to land the jet.

This American violation of operating in Italian airspace and landing in a Roman airport without overflight or landing permissions was seen by the Italians as an affront to their laws and safety regulations and negatively influenced diplomatic relations between the countries for some time. Diplomatic relations with Egypt also were negatively impacted as they continued to demand an apology from the U.S. for forcing the airplane off course.

== Abbas question ==
The question of what should happen to Abu Abbas became complicated due to competing international pressures.

=== U.S. extradition attempt ===
With Israeli intelligence proving that Abbas was the mastermind behind the hijacking, the U.S. Justice Department sought to deliver a warrant for his arrest to Rome that complied with the requirements of the U.S.–Italy extradition treaty. If such a warrant could be produced, Italy, in compliance with the treaty, would be required to hold Abbas for 45 days. As the Justice Department sought to avoid revealing Israeli classified intelligence information they began working with the Israeli embassy in Washington and officials in Tel Aviv to produce a declassified version that was strengthened with U.S. information. The Justice Department then petitioned Judge Charles R. Richey of the U.S. District Court in Washington, DC who issued warrants for Abbas and the hijackers.

The Situation Room transmitted a message from President Reagan to Prime Minister Craxi about holding Abbas and reminded him of the obligations under the extradition treaty. Attorney General Edwin Meese called his Italian counterpart Mino Martinazzoli informing him of the arrest warrants. The Federal Bureau of Investigation notified Italian law enforcement agencies of the warrants. Maxwell Rabb, U.S. Ambassador to Italy, delivered the warrants to Salvatore Zhara Buda of the Italian Ministry of Justice at his home at 5:30 a.m. on Saturday, October 12.

The Reagan Administration shared transcripts of radio conversations that took place between the hijackers and Abbas (along with other evidence obtained by the Defense Department and the CIA) to indicate that he had remained close to the ship and directed the hijacking.

Within hours of Rabb's early morning visit to his home, Buda met with three judges from the Ministry of Justice to review the petition. The group then advised Craxi and Martinazzoli that the documents did not support a provisional arrest of Abbas. Craxi later announced that the Justice Ministry held that the U.S. request did not "satisfy the factual and substantive requirements laid down by Italian law", so there was no legal basis to hold him any longer as he was on board an aircraft that had extraterritorial status.

While most in the Reagan administration were shocked by Italy's decision, Nicholas Veliotes in Cairo was not. To him, the document had obvious signs of Israeli Mossad involvement, a fact he anticipated would not please the Italians.

Craxi and his cabinet met at 1:30 p.m. on Saturday to discuss Italy's situation. Not only was the American situation clear, but Rabb interrupted the meeting with a personal plea from Reagan to hold Abbas. Craxi weighed whether Italy should upset the senior member of NATO or undermine its relatively good relations among Middle East nations.

Egypt's President Mubarak was already lashing out at American arrogance and Italy's assistance in the affair. It continued to demand that Italy return its plane and Abbas, and seemed to be holding Achille Lauro as ransom for their return. The Egyptian populace was irate at the American action and Craxi worried that if the U.S. wound up with Abbas an outraged Egyptian populace might turn against Mubarak for caving in the face of pressure.

Italy also had something approaching rapprochement with the PLO that kept its terrorists away from Italian citizens and interests. This was a result of a 1973 deal made between Italy and the PLO after an attack on an airport in Rome. The PLO would not target Italians in exchange for Italian acquiescence of its objectives. Arafat was able to contact Craxi warning him that "uncontrollable actions could result" if Abbas was turned over to the U.S.

In support of the American position was Defense Minister Spadolini along with the provincial magistrate who had authorized the jailing of the four hijackers. He was joined in his opinion on the U.S. request by a judge in Rome. (Normally, provincial magistrates are the first to adjudicate extradition requests.)

After consideration, Craxi and his cabinet voted to permit Abbas to depart from Italy. The Italian foreign ministry informed the Egyptian and American ambassadors of the decision.

Italy had decided that there was insufficient evidence to link Abbas to the hijacking and rejected a preliminary request from the U.S. that Italy hold him. A standing agreement between Italy and the U.S. that allowed suspects to be temporarily detained regardless of evidence was also put aside. Abraham Sofaer, a State Department legal adviser, complained to reporters that the Italians had rushed a decision on Abbas despite America's promise shortly before that even more proof would be provided to link Abbas to the hijackers.

=== Yugoslav escape ===
Following a deal Yasser Arafat reached with Giulio Andreotti even before the Craxi government had made its final decision, Abbas and Badrakkan, wearing unidentified uniforms, had been put back on the EgyptAir 737 airliner. They were joined by Egyptian diplomat Zeid Imad Hamed who had been with them in their initial flight from Cairo. Hamed had arranged for JAT, a Yugoslav national airline, to take the men from Rome Fiumicino Airport to Belgrade. With no objections from Craxi, at 5:30 p.m. EgyptAir flight 2843 flew the 10 minutes from Ciampino airport to Fiumicino. Abbas and Badrakkan left the Egyptian plane, walked across the ramp escorted by Italian security forces and embarked on the Yugoslav aircraft. They left for Belgrade, Yugoslavia, at 7:10 p.m., Saturday, October 12, 1985.

The next day, on October 13, the U.S. lodged a protest over Italy's allowing Abbas to depart and also requested his extradition from Yugoslavia (which diplomatically recognized the PLO). According to Abraham Sofaer, before the plane carrying Abbas to Yugoslavia even touched down, the Reagan Administration gave Yugoslav authorities the intelligence information it had passed onto the Italian government, along with "the transcripts and the hard evidence that we have accumulated in the 24 or 48 hours since then". The Yugoslav government rejected the U.S. petition, saying it was legally groundless, and complained about the USS Saratoga's participation in the capture of the hijackers. By October 14, the Yugoslav press agency Tanjug and PLO officials within that country announced that Abbas had left Yugoslavia. The U.S. State Department released a statement declaring "extreme disappointment" that Yugoslav authorities had denied their request.

== International relations ==
Egyptian President Mubarak continued his demand for a personal apology from U.S. President Reagan for intercepting the EgyptAir flight. There had been no contact between him and the Reagan administration around the interception and he had learned of it from the news media. He told reporters the incident was "unheard of under any international law or code," and that "I am very wounded. Now there is coolness and strain as a result of this incident".

Mubarak also told reporters the incident was "strange and regrettable... When I heard of it, I said, 'What piracy is this?' I never thought that a friendly country would send four jetfighters to intercept an unarmed civilian plane. I was amazed. I believe it is theatrics and not heroism". Reflecting on U.S. relations with Egypt he said "May God help us to get over this matter. A long time must pass before we will be able to forget this painful wound." Outside Egypt's Cairo University thousands of demonstrators shouting anti-Israeli and anti-American slogans clashed with police – at least 30 were injured and dozens arrested. Some demonstrators called for Mubarak's assassination.

There became a concern in the U.S. that Mubarak believed that he had been publicly humiliated by the U.S. and would move toward reconciliation with other Arab states at the cost of relations with Israel and the U.S. This was seen as being detrimental to Middle East peace efforts and perhaps even another Arab-Israeli war. An unnamed Egyptian source told The New York Times, "Reagan has humiliated Mubarak and in the Arab world that is unheard of if you are supposed to be a friend."

U.S. State Department spokesman Charles E. Redman told reporters "What is important now is to put it behind us and concentrate on the larger issues, especially our shared commitment to peace in the Middle East." When asked by a reporter if the U.S. had any reason to apologize for the diversion of the airliner, he replied "Never". White House spokesman Larry Speakes stated that while the U.S. would work to restore good relations with Egypt there was to be no apology, "We've said everything we need to say." During the incident the U.S. praised Egypt's efforts to save the lives of the hostages, never criticized Mubarak personally, but did make it clear that they were displeased by Egypt's "independent" decision to give the hijackers safe passage. Speakes told reporters at the time "The United States wants to emphasize the fundamental and durable interest that the United States and Egypt share, interests which transcends this difficult incident". Mubarak described what the U.S. had done as a "stab in the back". The Reagan administration sent a diplomatic envoy led by Deputy Secretary of State John C. Whitehead to Egypt for a "thorough and friendly discussion" telling Mubarak that they hoped to "put our recent differences behind us."

George Shultz met with Giulio Andreotti and voiced the American unhappiness with Italy's treatment of Abbas. Shultz also rejected a reporter's suggestion that the U.S. interception was itself an act of terrorism. Redman also said that despite the U.S. unhappiness with the actions of the Craxi government, U.S. relations with Italy remained close, stating "We want to preserve the good, overall relations, which are based on shared interests which transcend this incident".

On October 17, 1985, Craxi's 26-month-old Italian Socialist-led government fell due to Defense Minister Giovanni Spadolini's Republican Party withdrawing from the five-party coalition the day before out of displeasure of Craxi's allowing Abbas to escape. Spadolini insisted that Craxi had not consulted him in the decision to let Abbas go free.

The actions of Syria during the hijacking were seen as a positive by the U.S., with Redman praising Damascus for its help in determining if a body that washed ashore was that of Klinghoffer.

The U.S. also praised the Tunisian government for refusing to allow the EgyptAir jet landing rights. Relations between the two governments had become frosty when the U.S. categorized the Israeli attack on the PLO headquarters on October 1, 1985, where 12 Tunisians were slain, as an action against a "terrorist sanctuary" which caused the Tunisians to say relations were "irreparable". The U.S. not vetoing United Nations Security Council Resolution 573, which condemned Israel for the raid, was seen as an attempt to improve relations.

== Klinghoffer's body ==
Klinghoffer's body was found on the Syrian coast on the night of 12 October. It was transported to a military hospital in Damascus where it was identified by a team from the American consulate before being flown to Italy on a regular Alitalia flight for an autopsy.

On October 15, 1985, the Reagan Administration told reporters that a partially decomposed body that had washed up on the Syrian coast with a bullet hole in the skull fired from above was that of Leon Klinghoffer. At the time the four hijackers, Yasser Arafat, and Farouk Kaddoumi all continued to claim that no one had been murdered during the hijacking.

The Administration announced that they would be convening a Federal grand jury to consider an indictment against the four hijackers and Abu Abbas who was believed to have fled to South Yemen (a pro-Soviet Arab nation with no diplomatic relations to the U.S.).

== Legal actions ==
There were several stages of court and legal actions taken against the hijackers of the Achille Lauro and Abu Abbas.

=== Jurisdiction ===
The U.S. had originally planned to charge the terrorists with piracy under its Criminal Code of 1909 "whoever, on the high seas, commits the crime of piracy as defined by the law of nations, and is afterwards brought into or found in the United States, shall be imprisoned for life." But this would have been problematic as the U.S. recognized international law on the matter, specifically the 1982 United Nations Convention on the Law of the Sea that stated "a seizure of a ship for political purposes is not considered piracy".

Due to the murder, the U.S. could claim jurisdiction under the passive personality principle and try the terrorists under its Crimes Act of 1790 (although its Supreme Court had questioned in U.S. v. Palmer (1818) if the act extended to non-citizens). However, with the suspects turned over to Italian hands, to try the terrorists the U.S. would have had to use the normal processes of extradition. Even had the Americans done so, Italy could have easily claimed its own right of jurisdiction as primary as the ship flew under an Italian flag, began its voyage in Italy, and the terrorists had come aboard in an Italian port.

In the view of the Italian courts it was of no significance that the suspects found themselves in Italy's jurisdiction through no choice of their own, especially as there had been no wrongful act by Italian authorities.

=== Hijackers ===
On July 10, 1986, an Italian court ruled the Palestinians guilty of "carrying out a kidnap with terrorist intent, leading to the death of a hostage". The court did not refer to the hijackers as terrorists, rather calling them "soldiers fighting for their ideals". Three of the hijackers were sentenced to prison terms ranging from fifteen to thirty years. While Youssef Majed Molqi (the hijacker who had shot Klinghoffer) received one of the longest sentences of the group, the court cited the conditions of his childhood growing up surrounded by violence in a Palestinian refugee camp as a mitigating circumstance.

Another group of three Palestinians received sentences between six months and seven and a half years. The court ruled that Abbas had been the organizer and he and two of his colleagues received life sentences in absentia. Three others were acquitted on the grounds that they had not been properly identified in the indictment.

The hijackers received lighter punishments because it was held by the court that they were acting on "patriotic motives", while Abbas and the planners had engaged in a "selfish political act" meant "to weaken the leadership of Yasser Arafat." The fourth hijacker was a minor at the time of the seizing of the Achille Lauro and was separately tried and convicted.

The fate of those convicted of the hijacking is varied:

- Ahmad Marrouf al-Assadi (age 23 at 1986 trial) disappeared in 1991 while on parole, but in 1994 was known to Spanish authorities, during the trial of Monzer al-Kassar. (Note: Although according to most sources this occurred during 1992 while al-Assadi was still in prison, according to Bohn's The Achille Lauro Hijacking, al-Assadi was convinced to testify in the Spanish court against the Syrian billionaire arms dealer el-Kassar, but later recanted and refused to travel to Spain.)
- Bassam al-Asker (age 17 at 1986 trial) was granted parole in 1991. He was thought to have died on February 21, 2004, but according to the Lebanese Daily Star, he had instead fled the country. He spent 14 years in Iraq before travelling to the Nahr al-Bared refugee camp in Lebanon, training Palestinian militiamen to fight the US army alongside Iraqi rebels as of 2007.
- Ibrahim Fatayer Abdelatif (age 20 at 1986 trial) was sentenced to 30 years' imprisonment. He served 20 and three more on parole and on July 7, 2008, he was expelled from an illegal immigrant detention center in Rome. He planned to appeal this, arguing that he has nowhere else to go since Lebanon will not allow his return as he was born in a refugee camp and is thus not a Lebanese citizen.
- Youssef Majed al-Molqi (age 23 at 1986 trial), convicted of killing Leon Klinghoffer, was sentenced to 30 years. He left the Rebibbia prison in Rome on February 16, 1996, on a 12-day furlough and fled to Spain, where he was recaptured and extradited back to Italy. On April 29, 2009, Italian officials released him from prison early, for good behaviour. In June 2009, however, al-Molqi's attorney told the Associated Press that the Italian authorities had placed his client in a holding cell and were about to deport him to Syria.

=== Klinghoffer settlement ===
Marilyn Klinghoffer only learned the truth after the hijackers left the ship at Port Said. PLO Foreign Secretary Farouq Qaddumi later denied that the hijackers were responsible for the murder, and suggested that Marilyn had killed her husband for insurance money. Over a decade later, in April 1996, PLF leader Muhammad Abu Abbas accepted responsibility, and in 1997, the PLO reached a financial settlement with the Klinghoffer family.

=== Fate of Abbas ===
In January 1988, the US dropped its arrest warrant for Abbas deferring to his Italian conviction and due to insufficiency of evidence at the moment to take him to trial on different charges. The US Justice Department claimed that other countries that had evidence against him were refusing to cooperate with their prosecution. At a 1988 press conference in Algeria, Abbas offered a different explanation for the death of Klinghoffer "Maybe he was trying to swim for it." No overt attempt to capture Abbas or enforce his sentence was made by Italy, who desired continued relations with the PLO.

During the late 1980s and early 1990s, Abbas would move from Tunisia to Libya. Abbas' PLF continued to receive Arafat's endorsement, and in 1990, President George H. W. Bush rescinded his earlier recognition of the PLO for Arafat's refusal to condemn a PLF attack (in 1990, he masterminded a plot to attack Israeli beaches with 17 terrorists using hang gliders but they were intercepted by the Israelis who killed four of them). In 1990, Abbas went into hiding and the US issued a warrant for his arrest with an offer of a $250,000 reward for his capture. This was withdrawn in 1992 with the presidency of Bill Clinton and his administration's work towards the Oslo Accords. In 1990, Libya withdrew their support of the PLF, leaving Iraq as the only nation state supporting Abbas.

In 1994, Abbas was given sanctuary in Iraq by Saddam Hussein. Abbas (born in a Syrian refugee camp) made his new home in Gaza (after being given amnesty in 1996 in line with the 1993 signing of the Oslo Peace Accords). He became a representative of the Palestine National Council. The administration of President Bill Clinton, aware of Abbas' resurfacing, neither asked for his extradition nor requested he be turned over to Italy who had found him guilty in absentia. The U.S. Senate passed a resolution 99–0 asking Clinton to request Abbas' extradition to the U.S. The Congressional Research Service held that the statute of limitations had not expired because Abbas was a fugitive from justice. Clinton's critics also pointed out that the U.S. was not a signatory to the Oslo Accords, and that they make no mention of the U.S.'s ability to prosecute anyone.

Throughout the 1990s, Abbas moved back and forth from Baghdad to the West Bank, secretly recruiting more Palestinians to join the PLF, while he told the news media that he was reformed and that the Achille Lauro hijacking had been an accident.

In 2000, during the Palestinian uprising, he left Gaza, returning to Baghdad. While in Iraq, Abbas became the conduit through which Hussein, sworn enemy of Israel, paid $25,000 bounties to the families of Palestinian suicide bombers who killed Israelis.

In 2001, the Israelis caught two PLF cells that Abbas had recruited and trained after they had murdered an Israeli teenager. Bassam al-Ashker, one of the four Achille Lauro hijackers, had risen to be Abbas' top deputy in the PLF and was in charge of training, planning, and logistics for the cell. Cell members were arrested in the areas of Ramall and Jenin. One of them confessed that the PLF had trained them to use automatic weapons, rocket-propelled grenades, and bomb building at the Al-Quds military camp outside Baghdad. By the time the Israelis had captured the cell they had kidnapped and murdered Israeli teenager Yuri Gushchin, set off a bomb at an Israeli checkpoint (injuring five), planted failed bombs, and shot at Israeli vehicles. The cell was prevented from a planned mass killing at Ben Gurion Airport and attacking targets within Tel Aviv and Jerusalem. The group was also charged with smuggling weapons in the diplomatically protected car of Palestinian Authority official Abdel Razak al-Yehiyeh.

Speaking to The New York Times in 2002 Abbas denounced Osama bin Laden and sought to distance the Palestinian cause from Al Qaeda's declared holy war against the United States. He stated that the PLF had a limited, historic goal of liberating Palestine, while Al Qaeda's goal was borderless and limitless. He held that the death of Klinghoffer was unfortunate collateral damage, similar to innocent Japanese civilians killed by the American use of atomic bombs on Hiroshima or Nagasaki. Also in 2002, the Israelis discovered that the PLF had recruited a new cell that had been sent to Baghdad to be trained by the Iraqi intelligence agency to use rocket-propelled grenades and Russian shoulder-fired anti-aircraft missiles. While training, the cell was visited by Abbas and Ashker (who delivered instructions on surveying targets and executing plans). The Israelis were able to disrupt the new cell's plans before they could be executed. In September 2002, the Israelis found information in material they had seized when they occupied a section of Arafat's compound in Ramallah earlier that year. This information showed links between Abbas and Arafat and that the Palestinian Authority (along with Iraq) financed some of the PLF's expenses.

On Monday April 14, 2003, during the Iraq War, Abbas was captured in the outskirts of Baghdad by U.S. Special forces acting on information from U.S. Intelligence. The Palestinian Liberation Front had moved from Tunisia to Iraq after the Achille Lauro hijacking. American Special forces captured several others at Abbas' compound and seized documents and passports.

Palestinian Cabinet member Saeb Erakat protested that the seizure of Abbas was in violation of the Oslo peace accords (signed by the US, Israel, the EU, Russia, Jordan, Egypt, Norway, and the Palestinian Authority) which agreed that no member of the PLO would be arrested or brought to trial for actions previous to September 13, 1993.

In October 2002, President George W. Bush had accused Iraq of having "provided safe haven" for Abbas, presenting this as another rationale for military action.

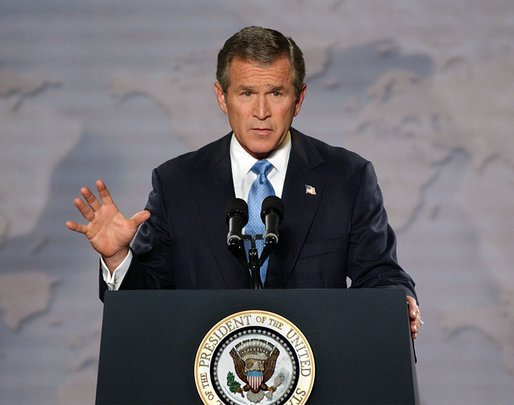
President George W. Bush In Cincinnati on October 7, 2002, charges Saddam Hussein's Iraq with harboring Abu Abbas.

"And, of course, sophisticated delivery systems aren't required for a chemical or biological attack; all that might be required are a small container and one terrorist or Iraqi intelligence operative to deliver it. And that is the source of our urgent concern about Saddam Hussein's links to international terrorist groups. Over the years, Iraq has provided safe haven to terrorists such as Abu Nidal, whose terror organization carried out more than 90 terrorist attacks in 20 countries that killed or injured nearly 900 people, including 12 Americans. Iraq has also provided safe haven to Abu Abbas, who was responsible for seizing the Achille Lauro and killing an American passenger. And we know that Iraq is continuing to finance terror and gives assistance to groups that use terrorism to undermine Middle East peace."

Members of Bush's administration cited Abbas' capture as "yet another victory in the global war on terrorism" and (seemingly paraphrasing a Reagan quote from the time of the EgyptAir interception) said that it sends terrorists the message "You can run, but you cannot hide. We will hold you to account." Under American interrogation in Iraq, Abbas continued to deny direct involvement in the murder of Klinghoffer. He admitted planning the ship's seizure, but stated that he was not aboard the Achille Lauro at the time but in Jordan.

On Monday March 8, 2004, Abbas, age 55, died of natural causes while an American prisoner in an Iraqi jail outside Baghdad. He had been held there while discussions about his legal status and whether he could be tried in the US or elsewhere had continued. Most US anti-terrorism laws with extraterritorial provisions had been enacted after the hijacking. The Italian government, despite having sentenced Abbas to five consecutive life sentences in absentia, had not sought his extradition.

== Legacy ==
Following the murder of Leon Klinghoffer, the Klinghoffer family founded the Leon and Marilyn Klinghoffer Memorial Foundation, in cooperation with the Anti-Defamation League.

The Achille Lauro hijacking has inspired a number of dramatic retellings:

- The Hijacking of the Achille Lauro (1989) is a TV drama based on the hijacking, starring Karl Malden and Lee Grant.
- Voyage of Terror: The Achille Lauro Affair (1990) is a TV drama/action movie based on the hijacking, starring Burt Lancaster and Eva Marie Saint and directed by Alberto Negrin.
- The Death of Klinghoffer (1991) is an opera by John Adams and Alice Goodman after a concept of theatre director Peter Sellars. Its depiction of the hijacking has proved controversial.
- "The Visitors," chapter 2 of Julian Barnes's novel A History of the World in 10½ Chapters, is based on the hijacking.

The hijacking marked a pivotal moment for U.S. counterterrorism policy, prompting a wave of legislative, judicial, and diplomatic anti-terrorism measures and further distancing the U.S. from the PLO.

- The lack of international maritime counterterrorism protocols prompted the U.S. to form an interagency working group and pass International Maritime Organization MSC Circular 443, a non-binding act that recommended measures to prevent unlawful acts against passengers and crew. Egypt, Italy, and Austria followed the circular with a trilateral initiative to create the 1988 Convention for the Suppression of Unlawful Acts Against the Safety of Maritime Navigation.
- In January 1986, President Reagan withdrew U.S. support for the Amman Accord until the PLO would renounce terrorism and accept U.N. Resolutions 242 and 338, a move that caused the accord's collapse and triggered a diplomatic rift between Jordan and the PLO.
- Following the hijacking, the U.S. added two key titles to the Omnibus Diplomatic Security and Antiterrorism Act of 1986: the Terrorist Prosecution Act, a response to the Sigonella Crisis that extended federal jurisdiction to terrorist murders of U.S. citizens abroad, and the International Maritime and Port Security Act, which authorized inspections of foreign ports for terrorism-related risks.
- The hijacking was a key justification for the U.S. Congress designating the Palestine Liberation Organization as a terrorist organization under the Anti-Terrorism Act of 1987. The act referenced the hijacking and Klinghoffer's murder in its first section.
- On September 15, 1987, the U.S. cited the hijacking to shut down the Palestine Information Office in Washington, D.C.
- When the Anti-Terrorism Act of 1987 went into effect in March 1988, the U.S. unsuccessfully attempted to close the PLO Observer Mission to the United Nations.
- When Yasser Arafat applied for a U.S. visa to address the U.N. General Assembly in 1988, Secretary of State George Shultz denied the request due to Arafat's association with Abu Abbas and the Klinghoffer murder. After the U.N. General Assembly passed two resolutions condemning the U.S., the assembly moved the meeting to Geneva to enable Arafat's participation.
- The legal challenges faced by the Klinghoffer family in Klinghoffer v. S.N.C. Achille Lauro led Congress to pass Section 1003 of the Federal Courts Administration Act of 1992, which established a clear legal pathway for U.S. citizens to sue foreign organizations for terrorism. This statute has since formed the legal basis for major lawsuits, including those against KindHearts for Charitable Humanitarian Development, the Holy Land Foundation for Relief and Development, Arab Bank, the Islamic Association of Palestine, the Quranic Literacy Institute, and Students for Justice in Palestine.

== See also ==
- Black Sea hostage crisis
- City of Poros ship attack
- Terrorism in Egypt
