= VAQ-137 =

United States Navy squadron

Electronic Attack Squadron 137
- Active: 14 December 1973 - 26 May 1994, 1 October 1996 - Present (52 years, 6 months)
- Country: United States
- Branch: United States Navy
- Type: Electronic Attack
- Role: Electronic Warfare
- Part of: Carrier Air Wing Eleven
- Garrison/HQ: NAS Whidbey Island
- Nickname: Rooks
- Colors: #ffffff #000000
- Engagements: Operation Frequent Wind; Operation Fluid Drive; Operation Desert Storm; Operation Continue Hope; Operation Southern Watch; Operation Enduring Freedom; Operation New Dawn; Operation Inherent Resolve; Operation Prosperity Guardian; Operation Poseidon Archer
- Decorations: Navy Unit Commendation (4); Navy Meritorious Unit Commendation (3); Safety "S" (7); Battle "E" (6); Navy Expeditionary Medal (3); Armed Forces Expeditionary Medal (2); Humanitarian Service Medal; Admiral Arthur W. Radford Award (5); Prowler Squadron of the Year Award (2); Association of Old Crows- Outstanding Unit Award
- Website: https://www.airpac.navy.mil/Organization/Electronic-Attack-Squadron-VAQ-137/

Commanders
- Commanding Officer: CDR. Frank D. Willis
- Executive Officer: CDR. David M. Steppe
- Command Master Chief: CMDCM. Justin E. Boop

Insignia
- Callsign: ROOK
- Modex: 5XX
- Tail Code: NH

Aircraft flown
- Electronic warfare: EA-6B Prowler(1973-1994, 1994-2013); EA-18G Growler(2013-Present)

Electromagnetic Attack Squadron 137 (VAQ-137) also known as the "Rooks", is a United States Navy electromagnetic attack squadron based at Naval Air Station Whidbey Island Washington, flying the Boeing EA-18G Growler. The squadron is attached to Carrier Air Wing 11 (CVW-11), which is currently assigned to USS Theodore Roosevelt (CVN-71). Their radio callsign is "Flashback" and their tailcode is "NH" of CVW-11.

== History ==
There have been two separate squadrons designated VAQ-137. The Navy's rules of squadron lineage do not allow a subsequent squadron using the same designation (in this case: VAQ-137) as a previous squadron to lay claim to the history or heritage of the former squadron, but the subsequent squadron may use the former squadron's insignia and or name in homage to the former. The histories of both squadrons are outlined below.

=== First squadron designated VAQ-137 ===
==== 1970s ====
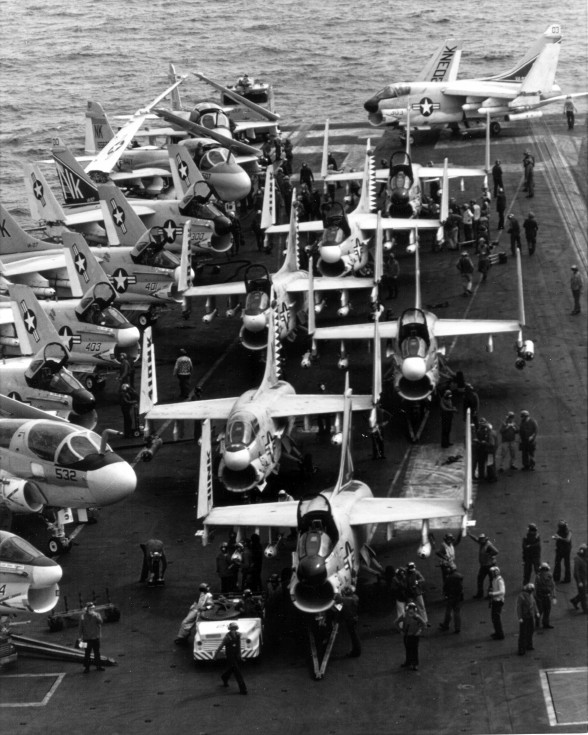
VAQ-137 Prowler on board USS Enterprise CVAN-65 in April 1975

VAQ-137 was established on 14 Dec 1973 and first deployed in 1974 with CVW-14 for a WESTPAC cruise aboard USS Enterprise, flying EXCAP EA-6B Prowlers. In April 1975, on station in the South China Sea, the squadron provided essential electronic surveillance for Operation Frequent Wind, the evacuation of Americans from Saigon. Between 1976 and 1978, the squadron made two Mediterranean cruises with CVW-6 aboard USS America. In April 1976, the squadron provided standoff ECM support for the evacuation of Americans from civil-war-torn Beirut, Lebanon. During the two cruises, the squadron obtained emitter data and the first Navy photos of the USSR 's Kiev-class aircraft carrier and their newest Kara-class cruiser. Between 1979 and 1982, VAQ-137 made three WESTPAC cruises with CVW-2 aboard USS Ranger.

==== 1980s ====
In January 1981, the squadron were on station in the North Arabian Sea when the Iranians released 52 American hostages held since November 1979. In March, USS Ranger received the Humanitarian Service Medal for the rescue of 138 Vietnamese boat people after a VAQ-137 crew sighted them. In 1983, the squadron joined CVW-3 for a Mediterranean cruise aboard USS John F. Kennedy. In November, they participated in a coordinated French/US air strike against an Iranian training camp at Baalbek, Lebanon. In December, they participated in a strike against SAM/AAA sites east of Beirut, providing essential radar jamming.

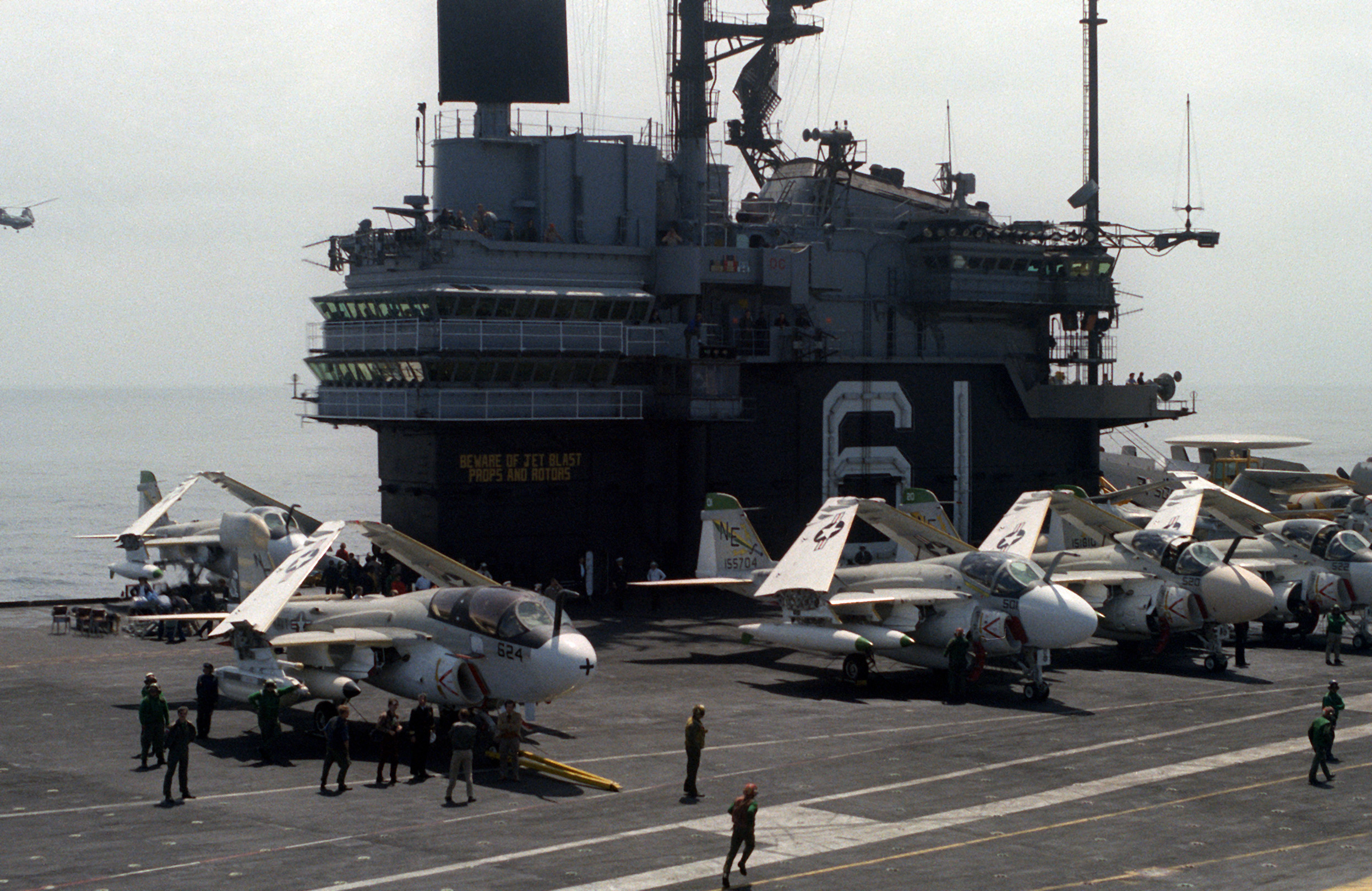
VAQ-137 EA-6B #624 on board USS Ranger in 1980. A-6 Intruders are also visible.

In February 1984, the ROOKS flew support missions while peacekeeping forces pulled out of Lebanon. In 1984, the ROOKS were the first EA-6B squadron to transition to ICAP II. Between 1985 and 1987, the squadron made two Med cruises with CVW-17 aboard USS Saratoga (CV-60). After the Italian cruiseliner, MS Achille Lauro was hijacked in October 1985, CVW-17 aircraft intercepted the hijackers' plane and forced them to land at a NATO airfield. In March 1986, VAQ-137 participated in the successful air strike against an SA-5 site at Sirte, Libya.

In 1989, the squadron joined CVW-1 for a Mediterranean and Indian Ocean cruise aboard USS America. During nine months at sea, VAQ-137 participated in nine major exercises in the North Atlantic, Mediterranean Sea and Indian Ocean. They sailed from the Arctic Circle to the Equator via the Suez Canal. In August, when Lieutenant Colonel Higgins, USMC, was executed in Lebanon, USS America emergency sortied from Singapore to be on station in the North Arabian Sea to provide electronic surveillance for contingency operations. When the United States evacuated the Beirut Embassy in September, the squadron provided EW support to the operation.

==== 1990s ====
In December 1990, the squadron deployed aboard USS America with five ICAP 2 Prowlers in support of Operation Desert Storm. During 212 combat sorties, the Rooks provided ECM coverage and fired 30 AGM-88 HARM missiles in support of the United Nations Coalition Forces. VAQ-137 was the only EA-6B squadron to fight the war from both the Red Sea and the Persian Gulf. Following the ceasefire, the squadron completed the Desert Storm deployment with a five aircraft TransMed and TransLant fly-off en route to Whidbey Island. After only four months, VAQ-137 returned to USS America in August 1991, and deployed to the North Atlantic for operations in the Norwegian Fjords during NORTHSTAR '91. In December 1991, the squadron deployed aboard USS America for MED 2-91. After three months of Mediterranean operations USS America sortied again for the Persian Gulf in March 1992. VAQ-137's last deployment ended in February 1994. During that deployment, the squadron participated in Operation Continue Hope over Somalia, Southern Watch over Iraq and Deny Flight over Bosnia.

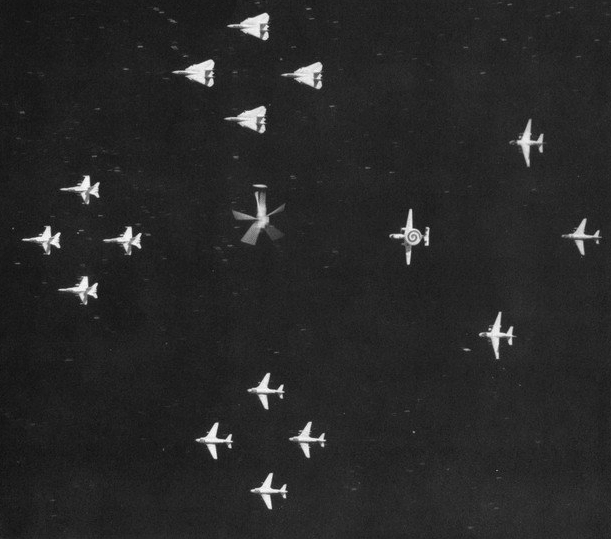
Carrier Air Wing 1 aircraft overhead view in 1991 assigned to USS America. VAQ-137 Prowler at the back of the formation.

The squadron was disestablished on 26 May 1994,

=== Second squadron designated VAQ-137 ===
In 1995, Program Budget Decisions 752 and 753 detailed the establishment of 5 EA-6B squadrons to replace the USAF EF-111A Raven in fulfilling the Joint Electronic Attack role. The current VAQ-137 was the third of those five squadrons to be established. The second/current VAQ-137 was established on 1 October 1996 at NAS Whidbey Island, Washington. Upon reaching full operational capability, the squadron was assigned to carrier Air Wing One and deployed aboard USS George Washington. During the 1997 deployment to the Persian Gulf in support of Operation Southern Watch, the squadron achieved 91 combat missions, 275 combat hours, 618 flight hours, 230 arrested landings, and a 100% Operation Southern Watch sortie completion rate. The squadron assimilated 3 additional aircraft, 12 aircrew, and 10 maintenance personnel to meet the increased JCS CONOPS requirements. At the conclusion of the deployment, VAQ-137 was awarded the Commander, Naval Air Forces Atlantic Fleet, Battle Efficiency Award for outstanding performance during 1997 and the semi-annual Safety "S" for the second half of 1997.

In September 1999, the squadron deployed aboard USS John F. Kennedy while attached to Carrier Battle Group SIX (CCG-6) and Carrier Air Wing One (CVW-1).In addition, the squadron operated the largest carrier based EA-6B squadron in history; eight aircraft deployed and seven flown back to NAS Whidbey Island. The squadron assimilated 3 additional aircraft, 12 aircrew, and 10 maintenance personnel to meet the increased JCS CONOPS requirements. In addition to other exercises, the Rooks participated in the "Bright Star" exercise off the coast of Egypt. The Rooks were both the first and last members of CVW-1 to fly missions in support of Operation Southern Watch combat sorties.

==== Operation Enduring Freedom ====
VAQ-137 deployed on USS Theodore Roosevelt on 19 September 2001. The squadron were the first Prowler squadron to deploy with night vision goggles and accumulated 751 NVD hours. The squadron spent a record 159 days at sea during Operation Enduring Freedom, flying three consecutive months of 400+ hours with 254 combat sorties flown.

==== 2003 Deployment and Afghanistan ====
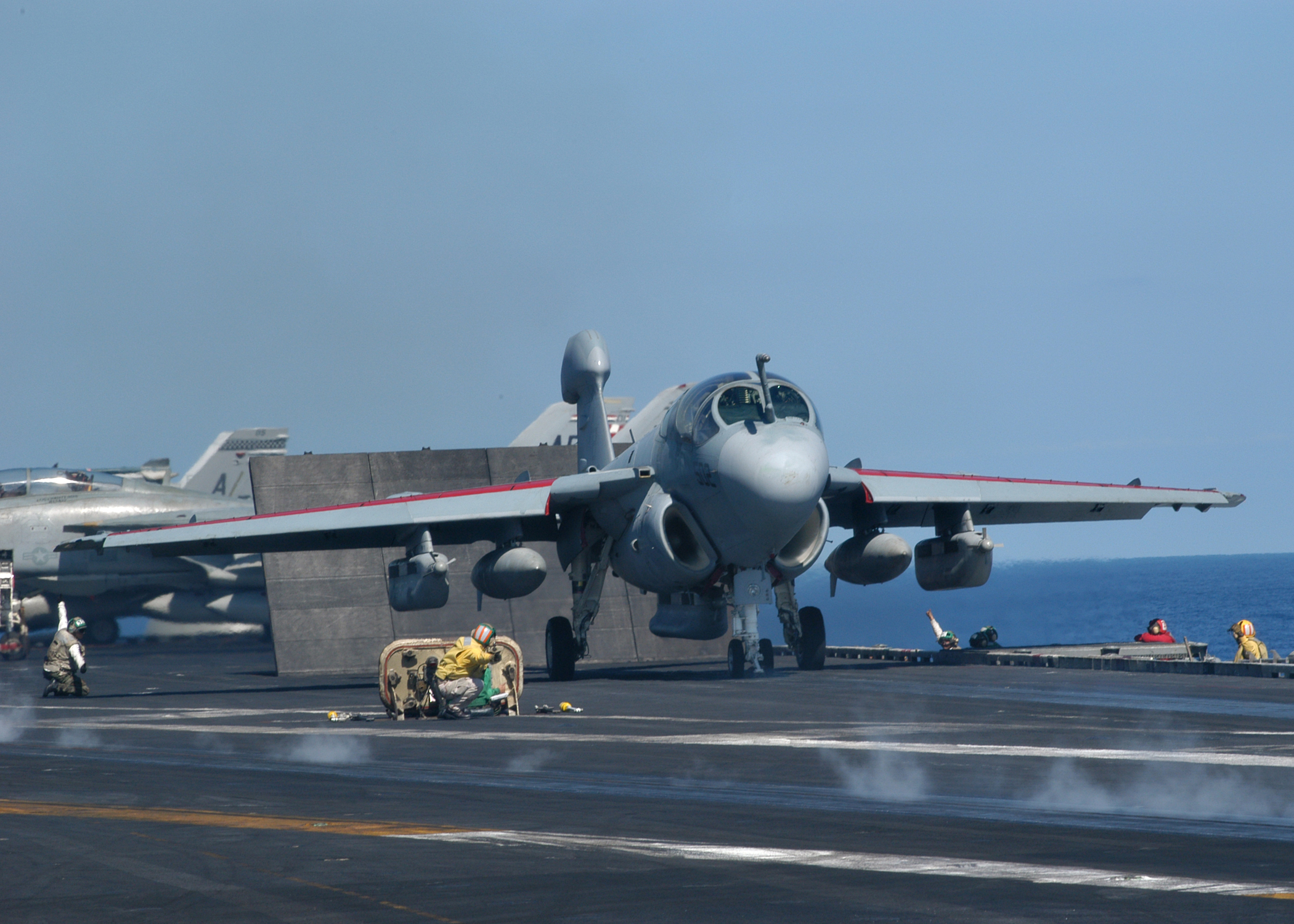
VAQ-137 EA-6B preparing for a catapult launch from USS Enterprise

In February 2003 the squadron began pre-deployment workups, completing TSTA III and COMTUEX in September 2003 and began deployment on 3 October 2003 with CVW-1 on board USS Enterprise. In early December 2003 the squadron were notified during a port call in Dubai, United Arab Emirates, that a detachment from the squadron was needed in Bagram Airfield Afghanistan. Less than 48 hours after official notification arrived, the squadron offloaded and transported approximately 17,000 pounds of cargo and more than 30 people to Bagram, and set up spaces to catch the inbound aircraft from the ship, becoming the first EA-6B Prowler squadron to be forward deployed to the base. In January 2004 the squadron was relieved by EA-6Bs from VAQ-142 and redeployed to USS Enterprise to complete their deployment.

==== Iraq War ====
In May 2006, the Rooks deployed on board USS Enterprise as a component of Carrier Air Wing ONE and Carrier Strike Group TWO. VAQ-137 successfully conducted split site operations in Al Asad Airbase, Iraq in direct support of the Global War on Terrorism.

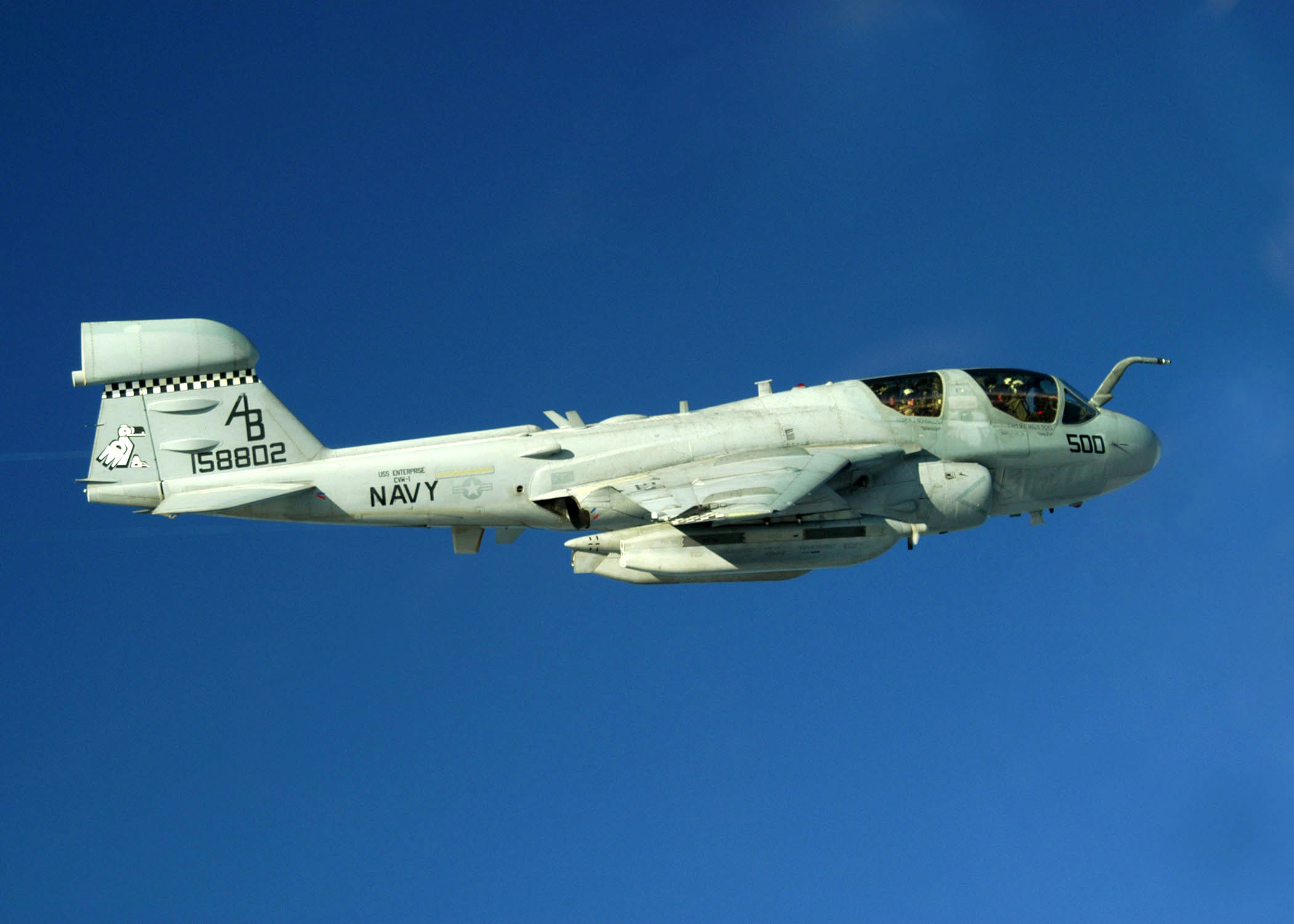
VAQ-137 EA-6B in 2003

In July 2007, the squadron deployed on USS Enterprise in the Persian Gulf.

In 2010, the squadron had an Inter Deployment Readiness Cycle (IDRC).

In 2011 the squadron supported combat operations in both Afghanistan and Iraq in Operations Enduring Freedom and the Iraq War, as well as counter-piracy operations in the Gulf of Aden and Indian Ocean. The squadron transitioned from ICAP III aircraft to the older ICAP II aircraft.

==== Last deployment of the EA-6B and transition to the EA-18G ====
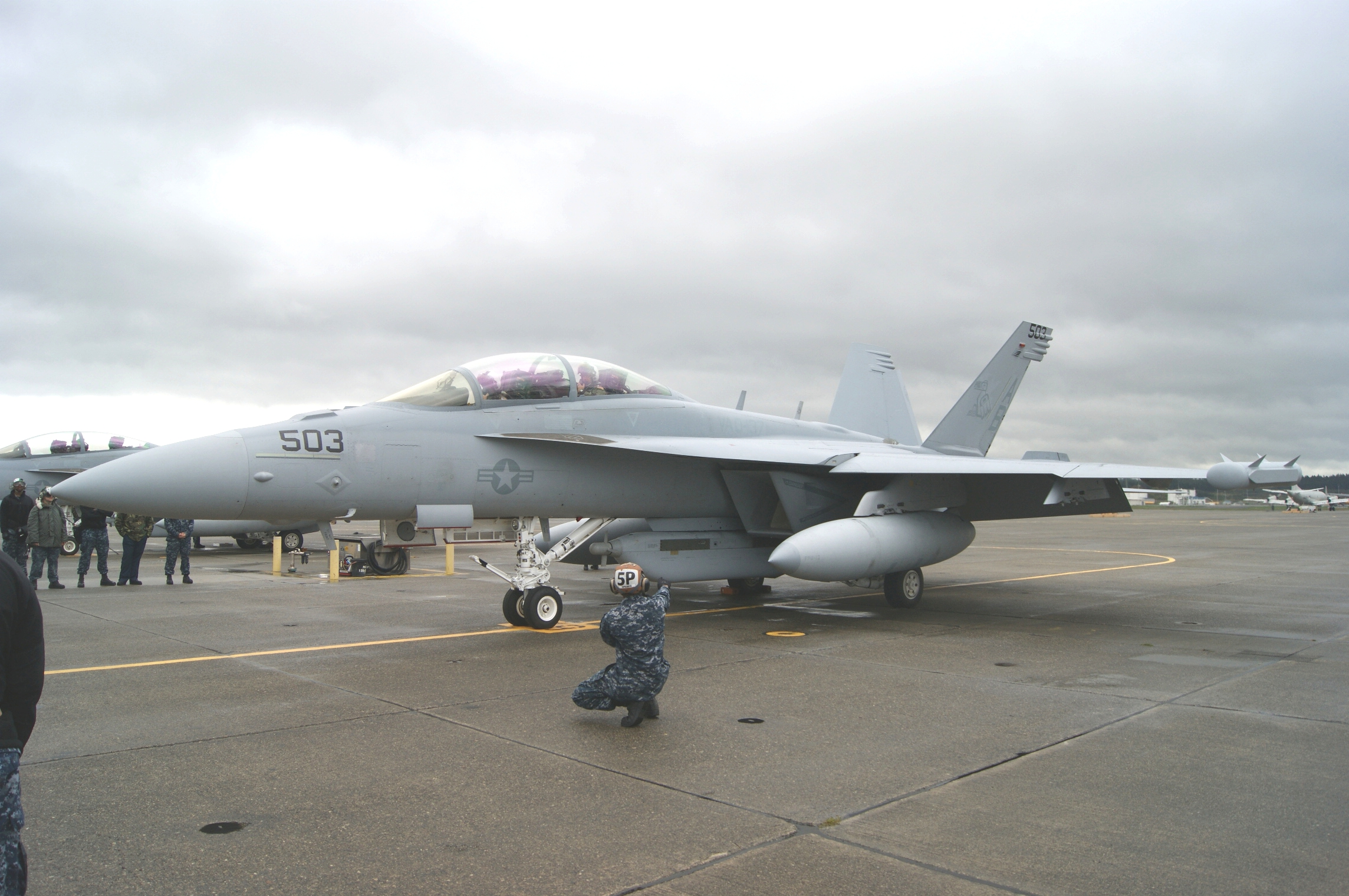
VAQ-137 EA-18G in 2013

The beginning of 2012 saw the squadron prepare for deployment with COMTUEX and JTFX in January and February. After a short turnaround at home at NAS Whidbey Island, the squadron deployed for the final voyage of USS Enterprise (CVN-65). The deployment was dominated by providing direct support for combat operations in Operation Enduring Freedom, where the squadron amassed 165 combat sorties and 1040 combat hours.

In October 2013 the squadron were deemed 'Safe for flight' in the EA-18G.

==== EA-18G operations ====
In March 2015, the Rooks deployed for the first time flying the EA-18G Growler, as part of CVW-1 on board USS Theodore Roosevelt (CVN-71). Throughout the nine-month deployment, the Rooks conducted combat operations in Iraq and Syria supporting Operation INHERENT RESOLVE (OIR), executing 291 combat sorties and 1,777 hours.

After returning home from deployment, the Rooks entered an array of post deployment training and maintenance phases in 2016. The squadron participated in a Red Flag Alaska detachment during April and May, working with US Air Force and Indian Air Force assets.

Following a successful workup cycle, the Rooks deployed aboard the USS Harry S. Truman (CVN-75) in April 2018. After leaving Norfolk, Virginia, the squadron participated in Operation LIGHTNING HANDSHAKE off the coast of Morocco in order to prepare for combat operations. The carrier then traveled toward the Eastern Mediterranean in support of Operation INHERENT RESOLVE. Heavy tasking led to the Rooks flying over 370 combat hours in just 22 fly days, with an impressive 100% combat sortie completion rate, earning the squadron the CVW-1 Golden Wrench for the line period.

After an extended port call in Norfolk, the Rooks and CVW-1 returned to sea in the second half of 2018. This time the USS Harry S. Truman (CVN 75) traveled north to be the first carrier in over 30 years to conduct flight operations north of the Arctic Circle when they participated in Operation TRIDENT JUNCTURE. The flight deck crews persevered in frigid conditions and earned the Order of the Blue Nose as they launched jets to conduct multi-national flight operations. The Rooks returned to NAS Whidbey Island in December 2018.

The Rooks subsequently deployed again aboard USS Truman in November 2019 in support of Iranian deterrence operations and Operation FREEDOM’S SENTINEL over Afghanistan. The squadron remained at sea until June 2020 due to the ongoing COVID-19 pandemic. The Rooks earned the 2020 Battle E, Safety S, and the Retention Excellence award for their efforts.

== Decorations ==
Four Navy Unit Commendations, three Meritorious Unit Commendations, eight Battle "E"s, three Navy Expeditionary Medals, two Armed Forces Expeditionary Medals, one Humanitarian Service Medal and six Safety "S" awards. In 1988, the squadron was awarded the Prowler Excellence Award. Twice the Rooks were selected "Prowler Squadron of the Year", and five times they've been awarded the prestigious Admiral Arthur W. Radford Award for highest achievement in electronic warfare among all VAQ/VMAQ squadrons.

== See also ==
- History of the United States Navy
- List of United States Navy aircraft squadrons
