= Omnibus Diplomatic Security and Antiterrorism Act of 1986 =

United States federal law

- Other short titles: Diplomatic Security Act, Victims of Terrorism Compensation Act, Terrorist Prosecution Act of 1985, International Maritime and Port Security Act, Fascell Fellowship Act
- Long title: An Act to provide enhanced diplomatic security and combat international terrorism, and for other purposes.
- Enacted by: the 99th United States Congress
- Effective: August 27, 1986

Citations
- Public law: Pub. L. 99–399
- Statutes at Large: 100 Stat. 853

Legislative history
- Introduced in the House as H.R. 4151 "Diplomatic Security Act" by Dan Mica (D-FL) on February 2, 1986; Committee consideration by House Committee on Foreign Affairs; Passed the House of Representatives on March 18, 1986 (389-7); Passed the Senate on June 25, 1986 (voice vote); Reported by the joint conference committee on August 12, 1986; agreed to by the House of Representatives on August 12, 1986 (voice vote) and by the Senate on August 12, 1986 (voice vote); Signed into law by President Reagan on August 27, 1986

The Omnibus Diplomatic Security and Antiterrorism Act of 1986, Pub. L. 99–399, 100 Stat. 853, enacted August 27, 1986, was introduced to the United States Congress in February 1986 as a House of Representatives Bill H.R. 4151. It reorganized U.S. diplomatic security by creating the Bureau of Diplomatic Security and the Diplomatic Security Service, mandated Accountability Review Boards after major incidents, and authorized funding for secure embassy construction. It expanded State Department counterterrorism tools, officializing the department's authority to restrict exports and services to terrorism-supporting states. The Act further established compensation for terrorism victims, strengthened maritime and nuclear security, and notably extended U.S. criminal jurisdiction to terrorist acts against Americans abroad.

On September 19, 1986, President Reagan hosted a ceremony to mark his signing of the Act in the previous month. Held in the Oval Office of the White House, among those attending were John Poindexter (National Security Adviser), Donald Regan (Chief of Staff), George Shultz (Secretary of State), Edwin Meese III (Attorney General) and Caspar Weinberger (Secretary of Defense).

== Background ==
The Omnibus Diplomatic Security and Antiterrorism Act of 1986 emerged chiefly as a response to a series of violent attacks and security failures in the early 1980s.

Bombings of U.S. embassies, including the 1983 Beirut embassy bombing, 1984 Beirut embassy bombing, and Kuwait Embassy Bombing, exposed the vulnerability of American diplomats. In response, an advisory panel led by Admiral Bobby Inman wrote the Inman Report, urging sweeping measures to enhance embassy security, including by creating a dedicated Diplomatic Security Bureau and improving building defenses. Titles I–IV of the Omnibus Act comprehensively implemented these recommendations.

The October 1985 Achille Lauro hijacking and subsequent extradition crisis at Sigonella of the responsible terrorists frustrated U.S. policymakers and highlighted the U.S.'s inability to prosecute terrorists abroad, leading to Title XII, the Terrorist Prosecution Act of 1985, extending American extraterritorial jurisdiction to crimes against U.S. citizens overseas. To mitigate future risk of unlawful activity at ports and at sea, policymakers also wrote Title IX, the International Maritime and Port Security Act to improve maritime security measures.

Reflecting Cold War espionage concerns at embassies abroad, the Fascell Fellowship Act established the Fascell Fellowship to replace Soviet-bloc local staff with American personnel in U.S. embassies.

The scandals during the 1985 Year of the Spy inspired increased espionage penalties, including confiscating spies’ profits and rewarding tipsters.

== Provisions ==
=== Title I - Diplomatic Security ===
Also known as the Diplomatic Security Act, the title charged the U.S. Secretary of State with protecting U.S. diplomatic missions, personnel, and information worldwide. The title created the Bureau of Diplomatic Security, led by a new Assistant Secretary of State for Diplomatic Security, and assigned responsibilities ranging from physical security at embassies and consulates to information security, emergency planning, and coordination with other agencies. The title also required unconditional cooperation from other federal agencies on national security matters and established procedures for security accreditation.

=== Title II - Diplomatic Security Service ===
Established the Diplomatic Security Service as the operational arm of the Bureau of Diplomatic Security. The Service, led by a Director, was authorized to conduct protective, investigative, and law enforcement functions. Special agents were permitted to carry arms and make arrests. The title also specified recruitment provisions emphasizing broader representation of women and minorities.

=== Title III - Performance and Accountability ===
This title required the Secretary of State to convene an Accountability Review Board after serious security incidents abroad that resulted in loss of life, serious injury, or major property damage. Boards were empowered to subpoena witnesses, hold classified hearings, and make both programmatic and personnel recommendations. Their findings would inform, but not control, other administrative or judicial proceedings. Boards would also submit reports to Congress.

=== Title IV - Diplomatic Security Program ===
This title authorized multi-year funding for overseas security construction and staffing, and mandated modern security standards in embassy design, such as setbacks and hardened facilities. Contractors were required to clear personnel and follow secure construction practices; firms doing business with Libya were barred from contracts. The title also required installation of metal detectors at diplomatic mission entrances, reimbursement to the Treasury for certain protective services, and enhanced oversight through the Inspector General of the Department of State and United States Information Agency. A notable provision prohibited the use of these funds for facilities in Israel, Jerusalem, or the West Bank.

=== Title V - State Department Authorities to Combat International Terrorism ===
This title broadened the rewards program for information leading to the prevention or prosecution of terrorism, established a Counterterrorism Protection Fund, and required Congress to be notified of terrorism-related travel advisories. It granted the Secretary of State authority to prohibit or license U.S. persons from providing training or services with military, law enforcement, or intelligence applications to governments designated as supporting terrorism, with extraterritorial reach and criminal penalties. The title further limited antiterrorism assistance to nonlethal and several narrowly defined items, including small arms and ammunition, explosive detection equipment, and limited armored vehicles. The title also authorized nonlethal airport security aid to Egypt and allowed the President to restrict exports to countries supporting terrorism.

=== Title VI - International Nuclear Terrorism ===
This title directed the U.S. to accelerate measures against nuclear terrorism, including suspending cooperation with states not party to the Convention on the Physical Protection of Nuclear Material. It required consultation with the Department of Defense on certain nuclear exports, an interagency review of overseas plutonium and uranium security standards, and called for an international conference on nuclear terrorism. Domestically, it amended the Atomic Energy Act of 1954 to require fingerprint-based FBI background checks for individuals with unescorted access to nuclear facilities or safeguards information.

=== Title VII - Multilateral Cooperation to Combat International Terrorism ===
This title encouraged greater international coordination, including the creation of an international antiterrorism committee and a NATO standing committee on terrorism. It urged improved passport and visa security measures and required a study of whether removing “place of birth” from U.S. passports would reduce risks for American travelers. Additional sections addressed abuses of diplomatic immunity for terrorism and called for reports on progress in multilateral cooperation.

=== Title VIII - Victims of Terrorism Compensation ===
Also known as the Victims of Terrorism Compensation Act, the title provided benefits to civilian captives and service members harmed by hostile acts. It established compensation for U.S. hostages held in Iran between November 4, 1979 and January 21, 1981, at $50 per day, and set ongoing provisions for pay, medical care, and leave benefits for other victims of terrorism. Entitlements became effective on October 1, 1986.

=== Title IX - Maritime Security ===
Cited as the International Maritime and Port Security Act, Title IX promoted improved seaport and shipboard security through the International Maritime Organization, requiring reports to Congress on progress. The title expanded Coast Guard authority for port and coastal facility security, mandated reviews of foreign port security by the Secretary of Transportation, and required advisories to U.S. travelers where ports were deemed unsafe. The President was authorized to suspend U.S. passenger ship service to insecure ports without prior notice or hearing, and to impose sanctions on ports that facilitated terrorist hijackings. The title authorized $12.5 million annually for fiscal years 1987–1991.

=== Title X - Fascell Fellowship Program ===
This title, called the Fascell Fellowship Act, established fellowships for American citizens to serve temporarily in positions at U.S. diplomatic and consular posts in the Soviet Union and Eastern Europe. Fellows were subject to security clearances and received benefits similar to other U.S. personnel. The program was administered by the State Department under the direction of a fellowship board.

=== Title XI - Security at Military Bases Abroad ===
Title XI recognized heightened terrorist threats to U.S. bases overseas and urged the Department of Defense to enhance base and community security measures. It also required a report to Congress on the steps taken to improve protection for service members and their families.

=== Title XII - Criminal Punishment of International Terrorism ===
This title, also known as the Terrorist Prosecution Act of 1985, created new extraterritorial federal crimes covering acts of terrorism against U.S. nationals abroad. It made homicide, attempts or conspiracies to kill, and other violent acts causing or intended to cause serious bodily injury prosecutable under U.S. law. Prosecution required written certification by the U.S. Attorney General that the acts were intended to coerce or intimidate a government or civilian population.

=== Title XIII - Miscellaneous Provisions ===
The final title authorized appropriations for the Peace Corps, encouraged stronger laws on demonstrations near embassies in Washington D.C., and expressed U.S. opposition to a United Nations retirement allowance for Kurt Waldheim. Other provisions supported the eradication of the Amblyomma variegatum tick in the Caribbean, urged stronger foreign-language education in the United States, endorsed the U.S. Telecommunications Training Institute, and mandated that convicted spies must forfeit all assets obtained via espionage. That included assets both directly and indirectly obtained by espionage, including from selling their story in interviews, books, etc. Lastly, the title reiterated U.S. support for Afghan independence and opposition to the Soviet occupation.

== See also ==
- Bureau of Diplomatic Security
- Diplomatic Security Service
- Reagan–Fascell Democracy Fellowship
- 1983 US embassy bombing in Beirut
- Achille Lauro hijacking
- Title VI of the Patriot Act
