= Derby, Vermont =

- Town
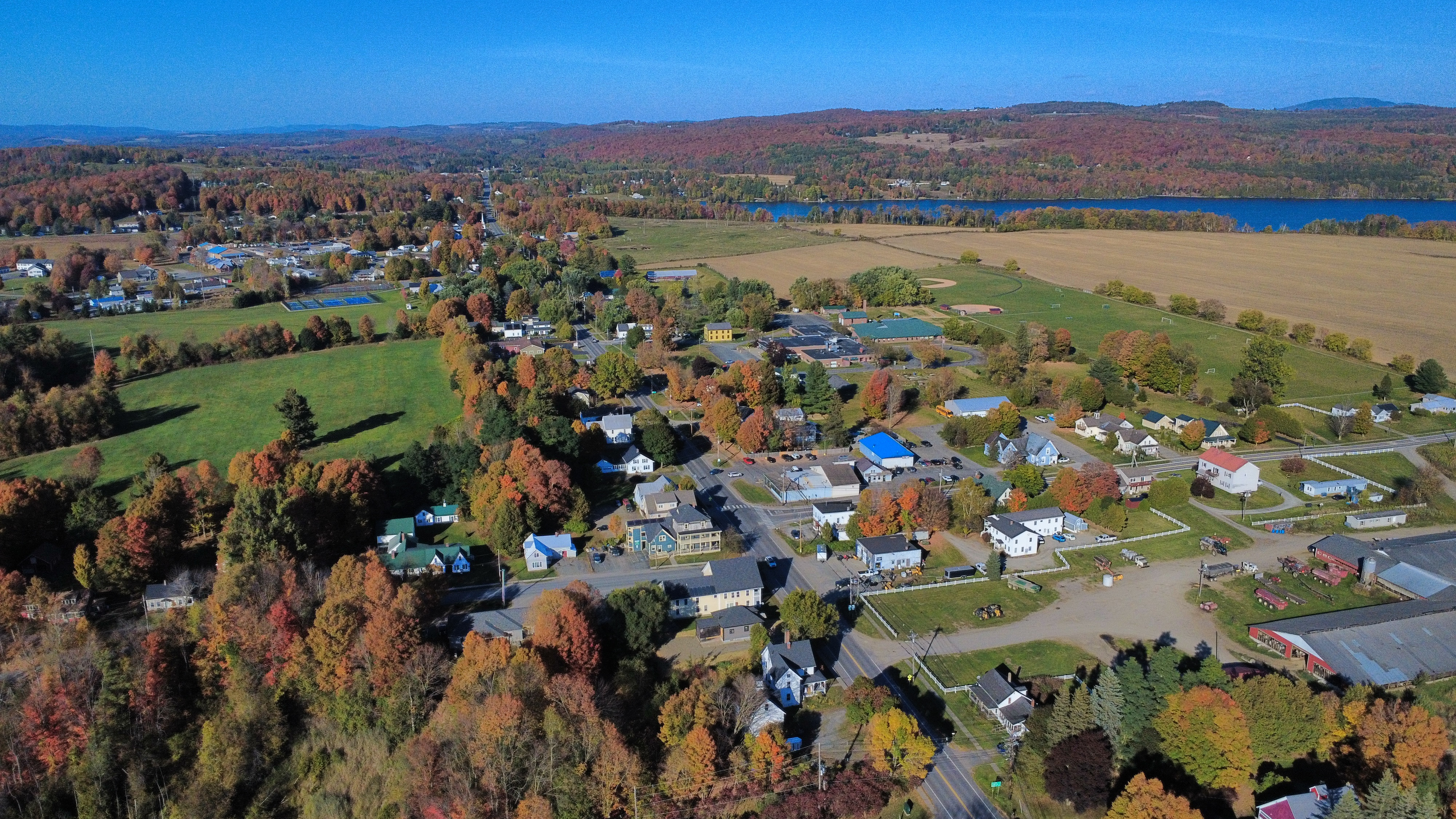
- Derby, VT, from the southwest

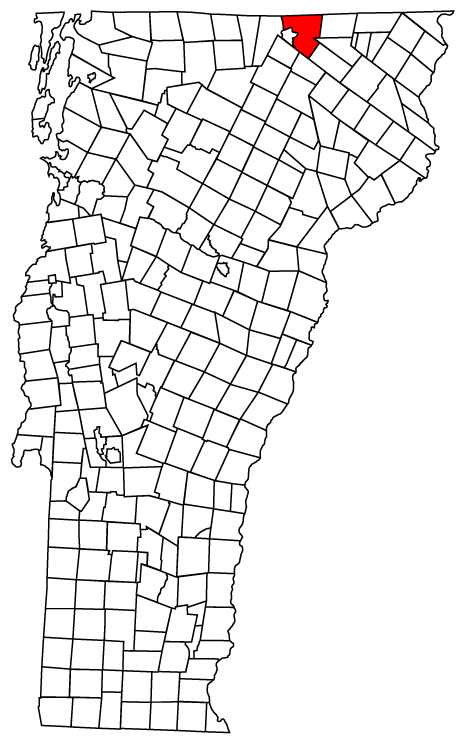
- Located in Orleans County, Vermont
- Coordinates: 44°56′50″N 72°07′47″W
- Country: United States
- State: Vermont
- County: Orleans
- Organized: October 29, 1779
- Communities: Beebe Plain; Derby Center; Derby Line; North Derby

Area
  - Total: 57.6 sq mi (149.2 km^{2})
  - Land: 49.7 sq mi (128.6 km^{2})
  - Water: 8.0 sq mi (20.7 km^{2})
- Elevation: 1,004 ft (306 m)

Population (2020)
  - Total: 4,579
  - Density: 92/sq mi (35.6/km^{2})
- Time zone: UTC-5 (EST)
  - Summer (DST): UTC-4 (EDT)
- ZIP Codes: 05829 (Derby); 05830 (Derby Line); 05855 (Newport)
- Area code: 802
- FIPS code: 50-17350
- GNIS feature ID: 1462081
- Website: derbyvt.org

Derby is a town in Orleans County, Vermont, United States. The population was 4,579 at the 2020 census, making it the most populous community in Orleans County. The town contains four unincorporated villages: Beebe Plain, Clyde Pond, Lake Salem, and North Derby, and two incorporated villages: Derby Center and Derby Line.

The northernmost town located along Interstate 91, the Town of Derby encompasses the largest area in Orleans County.

== Geography ==
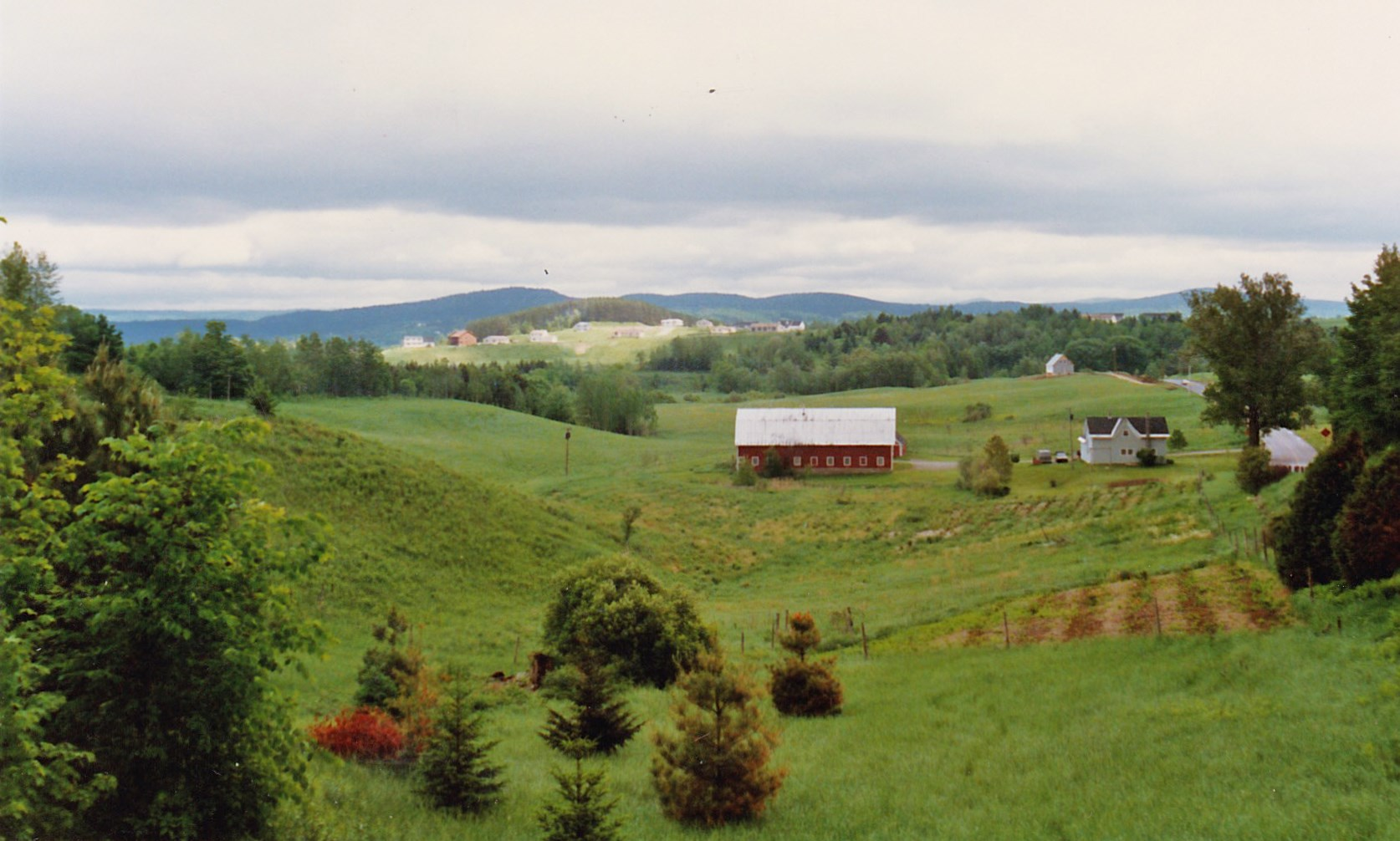
Countryside in Derby, VT

According to the United States Census Bureau, the town has a total area of 57.6 square miles (149.2 km^{2}), of which 49.6 square miles (128.5 km^{2}) is land and 8.0 square miles (20.7 km^{2}) (13.87%) is water. The town lies in the northernmost part of Orleans County, forming part of Vermont's border with the Canadian Province of Quebec, and is otherwise bordered to the east by Holland, the southeast by Morgan and Charleston, the southwest by Coventry and Brownington, and to the west by Newport and Lake Memphremagog.

Lake Salem is within the town boundaries. Clyde Pond was formed by damming the Clyde River.

== Government ==
Derby is represented by Brian Smith (R-Derby) and Larry Labor (R-Morgan) in the Orleans-1 district of the Vermont House of Representatives. It is represented by Robert Starr (D-North Troy) and Russ Ingalls (R-Newport) in the Essex-Orleans district of the Vermont Senate.

=== Local ===
- Moderator – H. Kendrick Young
- Selectmen – Grant Spates, Brad Shattuck, Stephen Gendreau, Brian Smith, Karen Chitambar
- Listers – Nancy Moore, Carmi (Mike) Marsh, Mark Linton
- 2023 Budget – $3,333,270

=== School district ===
- Director, North Country Union High School – Jesse Tatum (2010)
- Director – James Erwin (2009)
- Budget – $4,446,922

== History ==
On October 29, 1779, the state of Vermont chartered it to Timothy Andrus and fifty-nine associates, with an area of 23,040 acres (93.2 km^{2}). It was named after Derby, in England.

In the War of 1812, an expeditionary force of Quebec Eastern Townships' volunteers destroyed a barracks built at Derby with no personnel casualties.

Portus Baxter and David Camp were Underground Railroad agents before the Civil War.

On October 31, 1866, the town erected a granite monument at Derby Center in honor of those who died in the Civil War. It is inscribed: "In Memory of the Volunteers from Derby, who Lost their Lives in the Great Rebellion, 1861-’65.” It lists the names of fifty-three men from Derby. It is the oldest community memorial to that war in the United States.

The failed town of Salem was annexed to Derby by an act of the legislature of 1880, and took effect March 1, 1881. This increased the land size of Derby so it became the largest in Orleans County.

Like many Orleans County towns, Derby grew in population until 1890, after which the depression (then called "panics") of 1893 affected the local economy and agricultural prices. Population fluctuated until it hit a bottom in 1940. The town has grown steadily since.

In 1917, the city of Newport was formed from portions of the towns of Newport (the former village of Newport) and Derby (the former village of West Derby).

In 1928, the Canadian Gateway Airport opened off Vermont Route 111, within walking distance from Derby Center. It was the third airport constructed in the state. The larger and older airport, Burlington, was given the designation of "entry airport" from Canada resulting in the closure of Gateway in 1933.

A drive-in theater opened in 1950 and closed in 1985 on the Derby Road (Route 5).

== Demographics ==
Historical population
Census	Pop.	Note	%±
1800	178		—
1810	714		301.1%
1820	925		29.6%
1830	1,469		58.8%
1840	1,681		14.4%
1850	1,750		4.1%
1860	1,906		8.9%
1870	2,039		7.0%
1880	1,967		−3.5%
1890	2,900		47.4%
1900	3,274		12.9%
1910	2,530		−22.7%
1920	2,201		−13.0%
1930	2,165		−1.6%
1940	2,118		−2.2%
1950	2,245		6.0%
1960	2,506		11.6%
1970	3,252		29.8%
1980	4,222		29.8%
1990	4,479		6.1%
2000	4,604		2.8%
2010	4,621		0.4%
2020	4,579		−0.9%
U.S. Decennial Census

Derby town, Vermont – Racial composition Note: the US Census treats Hispanic/Latino as an ethnic category. This table excludes Latinos from the racial categories and assigns them to a separate category. Hispanics/Latinos may be of any race.
Race (NH = Non-Hispanic)	% 2020	% 2010	% 2000	Pop 2020	Pop 2010	Pop 2000
White alone (NH)	93.5%	97.1%	97.1%	4,280	4,486	4,472
Black alone (NH)	0.3%	0.4%	0.2%	14	19	11
American Indian alone (NH)	0.4%	0.2%	0.5%	17	10	22
Asian alone (NH)	0.2%	0.3%	0.3%	7	14	12
Pacific Islander alone (NH)	0%	0%	0%	0	1	1
Other race alone (NH)	0.1%	0%	0%	4	0	0
Multiracial (NH)	4%	1.2%	1.2%	183	57	55
Hispanic/Latino (any race)	1.6%	0.7%	0.7%	74	34	31

As of the census of 2000, there were 4,604 people, 1,832 households, and 1,319 families residing in the town. The population density was 92.8 people per square mile (35.8/km^{2}). There were 2,258 housing units at an average density of 45.5 per square mile (17.6/km^{2}). The racial makeup of the town was 97.57% White, 0.28% African American, 0.48% Native American, 0.28% Asian, 0.02% Pacific Islander, 0.11% from other races, and 1.26% from two or more races. Hispanic or Latino of any race were 0.67% of the population.

There were 1,832 households, out of which 35.2% had children under the age of 18 living with them, 58.1% were married couples living together, 9.7% had a female householder with no husband present, and 28.0% were non-families. 23.5% of all households were made up of individuals, and 11.0% had someone living alone who was 65 years of age or older. The average household size was 2.50 and the average family size was 2.92.

In the town, the population was spread out, with 27.2% under the age of 18, 5.9% from 18 to 24, 26.5% from 25 to 44, 25.3% from 45 to 64, and 15.1% who were 65 years of age or older. The median age was 39 years. For every 100 females, there were 99.6 males. For every 100 females age 18 and over, there were 92.8 males.

== Economy ==
=== Personal income ===
As of the census of 2000, the median income for a household in the town was $35,313, and the median income for a family was $39,688. Males had a median income of $31,120 versus $21,940 for females. The per capita income for the town was $17,192. About 8.8% of families and 10.2% of the population were below the poverty line, including 12.8% of those under age 18 and 8.8% of those age 65 or over.

=== Development ===
In 1917 the village of West Derby separated from the town of Derby and merged with the village of Newport in Newport Town to create the city of Newport.

Newer construction is overflowing from Newport onto the Newport-Derby Road (US Route 5). Large retailers and other stores and restaurants are located on this stretch of road as well.

The headquarters of the Community National Bank, which has 12 branches in Vermont, is located in Derby.

Indoor Recreation of Orleans County (IROC) was constructed in 2004 and featured a sports arena, aquatic center and a multipurpose gymnasium facility that could be utilized for a range of sports, including basketball, volleyball and indoor soccer. The facility was foreclosed in 2013 and has been converted into a hardware store, Sticks N Stuff.

== Media ==
=== Radio ===
- WMOO – 92.1 FM; Derby Center

== Notable people ==
- Charles Kendall Adams, educator and historian
- Portus Baxter, United States Representative
- David M. Camp, Lieutenant Governor of Vermont 1836–1841
- Enoch Chase, Wisconsin state senator
- Horace Chase, mayor of Milwaukee, Wisconsin
- Lucius G. Fisher, businessman and Wisconsin state legislator
- Aaron H. Grout, son of Josiah Grout and Vermont Secretary of State
- Josiah Grout, 46th governor of Vermont
- Willie Johnston, Civil War era Medal of Honor recipient; known as the "Little Drummer Boy"
- Benjamin H. Steele, Associate Justice of the Vermont Supreme Court
- William Tyler, first Catholic bishop of the Diocese of Hartford

== Transportation ==
With 103 miles (166 km), Derby has the most miles of road of any town or city in Orleans County. Derby also has the most Class 3 roads (dirt) of any town in Orleans County.

The town contains the northern termini of both Interstate 91 and U.S. Route 5, which parallel each other over the entire length of their routes. Interstate 91 has its final three interchanges in Derby. Several Vermont state routes, including Vermont Route 105, Vermont Route 111, and Vermont Route 191 also serve the town of Derby.

The Rural Community Transportation provides buses for general use, four buses north and south during the week from west Newport city to Derby Center, and two buses each way on Saturday. There is no fare. These provide special services for the handicapped and the elderly upon request.

== Notable buildings ==
- Haskell Free Library and Opera House

== See also ==
- Johns River (Vermont)
- Orleans County, Vermont
