= Title VI of the Patriot Act =

Title VI: Providing for victims of terrorism, public safety officers and their families is the sixth of ten titles which comprise the USA PATRIOT Act, an anti-terrorism bill passed in the United States after the September 11, 2001 attacks. It provides aid to the families of Public Safety Officers who were injured or killed in terrorist attacks, and amends the Victims of Crime Act of 1984.

== Subtitle A--Aid to Families of Public Safety Officers ==
Title I of the Omnibus Crime Control and Safe Streets Act of 1968 has provisions that provide for the payment of benefits for public safety officers or the family of those officers who are killed or who have suffered a catastrophic injury sustained in the line of duty. Section 611 of the Patriot Act expedited such payments and they are now to be made not later than 30 days after the injury has been certified if it was sustained while investigating, undertaking rescue or recovery efforts related to a terrorist attack. Section 612 similarly amended Public Law 107-37, which also provides benefits for public safety officers who sustained catastrophic injuries sustained in the September 11 attacks. The amendment included "permanent and total disability" in the allowable reasons an officer may receive benefits. Benefits were increased from $100,000 to $250,000.

The Assistant Attorney General was given expanded authority under section 614 of the Patriot Act to make grants to any organization that administers any Office of Justice Programs, which were established under the Omnibus Crime Control and Safe Streets Act of 1968. The relevance to Subtitle A is that the Programs include the Public Safety Officers Benefits Program.

== Subtitle B--Amendments to the Victims of Crime Act of 1984 ==
=== Crime victims fund ===
The Crime Victim Fund, which is regulated by the Victims of Crime Act of 1984, allows private entities or individuals to give donations, gifts or bequests into the Fund. Section 621 of the Patriot Act amended the formula for distributions from the Fund. The Director must distribute not less than 90 percent nor more than 110 percent of the amount distributed from the Fund in the previous fiscal year. However, this does not apply if the amount of money in the Fund is twice what was distributed in the previous financial year — in this case the Director may distribute up to 120 percent of the amount distributed in the previous fiscal year. The Director is also directed to distribute amounts to cover the judicial branch's administrative costs along with amounts to grant programs. Any funds left over from the distribution were to remain in reserve in the Fund for future fiscal years, without a fiscal year limitation. These changes were later rolled back by section 111 of the Departments of Commerce, Justice, and State, the Judiciary, and Related Agencies Appropriations Act, 2002 (H.R. 2500). The Patriot Act also changed the distribution percentages of the remaining amount in the Fund in a particular fiscal year. The percentage given to crime victim compensation programs and for crime victim assistance was lowered from 48.5% to 47.5%, while funds for demonstration projects, program evaluation, compliance efforts, training and technical assistance services to eligible crime victim assistance programs and for the financial support of services to victims of federal crime by eligible crime victim assistance programs was raised from 3% to 5%.

The anti-terrorism emergency fund clause of the Victims of Crime Act was amended. Previously it stated that "the Director may retain any portion of the Fund that was deposited during a fiscal year that was in excess of 110 percent of the total amount deposited in the Fund during the preceding fiscal year as an emergency reserve" so long as the amount does not exceed $100,000,000. It now reads that "the Director may set aside up to $50,000,000 from the amounts transferred to the Fund in response to the airplane hijackings and terrorist acts that occurred on September 11, 2001, as an antiterrorism emergency reserve" and also details how this amount may be replenished.

The Air Transportation Safety and System Stabilization Act created the September 11th Victim Compensation Fund, and this was made one of the Federal benefits that should be a primary payer to the States.

=== Crime victim compensation ===
Grants may be made from the Crime Victim Fund to eligible crime victim compensation programs. Section 622(a) and (b) of the Patriot Act increased the amount available to such programs from 40% to 60% of the total amount of the Fund. The eligibility of programs is defined in 42 U.S.C. § 10602(b), however the restrictions on funding only programs where the victim was a U.S. citizen affected on home soil was removed – now a program can provide compensation to U.S. citizens who were adversely affected overseas. Means testing was also waived for those who apply for compensation.

=== Crime victim assistance ===
Under the Victims of Crime Act, the Director may make an annual grant from the Crime Victims Fund to support crime victim assistance programs. Section 623 expands the territory and geography that the Director may offer assistance crime victims to the District of Columbia, the Commonwealth of Puerto Rico, the United States Virgin Islands, or any other territory or possession of the United States. The Victims of Crime Act was also amended to specifically prevent discrimination against victims because of any disagreement they may have with the way the State is prosecuting a criminal case. Grants may now be made for program evaluation and compliance efforts of crime victim assistance programs, as well as for training and technical assistance services. The director was also able to make use of funds for fellowships and clinical internships, as well as to carry out programs of training and special workshops for the presentation and dissemination of information resulting from demonstrations, surveys, and special projects.

=== Victims of terrorism ===
The Victims of Crime Act provides for compensation and assistance to victims of terrorism or mass violence. This was amended by section 624 of the Patriot Act to allow the Director to make supplemental grants to States for eligible crime victim compensation and assistance programs, and to victim service organizations, public agencies (including Federal, State, or local governments) and nongovernmental organizations that provide assistance to victims of crime. The funds could be used to provide emergency relief, including crisis response efforts, assistance, compensation, training and technical assistance for investigations and prosecutions of terrorism. It removed the restrictions on providing such grants to those who are not eligible for compensation under title VIII of the Omnibus Diplomatic Security and Antiterrorism Act of 1986 (also known as the Victims of Terrorism Compensation Act). However, any use of the emergency reserve set aside for response to acts of terrorism is to be reduced by any amount that was given to the victim under the Victims of Terrorism Compensation Act.
