= USS LST-911 =

1944 LST-542-class tank landing ship

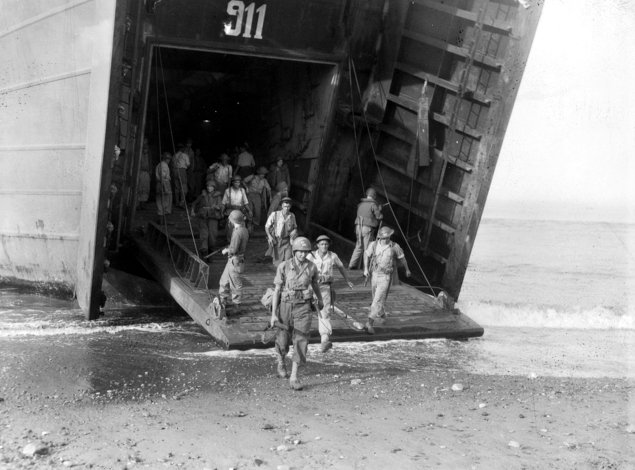
- USS LST-911 unloading RAAF No. 3 Airfield Construction Squadron at Mindoro Island, Philippines, 15 December 1944. Leading the way is Aircraftman H. Quick of Exeter, South Australia, five minutes after the ship hit the beachhead.

History

United States
- Name: LST-911
- Builder: Bethlehem-Hingham Shipyard, Hingham, Massachusetts
- Yard number: 3381
- Laid down: 28 February 1944
- Launched: 12 April 1944
- Sponsored by: Mrs. Christine Muir
- Commissioned: 14 May 1944
- Decommissioned: 24 June 1946
- Stricken: 31 July 1946
- Identification: Hull symbol: LST-911; Code letters: NVPM
- Honors and awards: 4 × battle star
- Fate: Sold for scrapping, 25 September 1947

General characteristics
- Class & type: LST-542-class tank landing ship
- Displacement: 1,625 long tons (1,651 t) (light); 4,080 long tons (4,145 t) (full (seagoing draft with 1,675 short tons (1,520 t) load); 2,366 long tons (2,404 t) (beaching)
- Length: 328 ft (100 m) oa
- Beam: 50 ft (15 m)
- Draft: Unloaded: 2 ft 4 in (0.71 m) forward; 7 ft 6 in (2.29 m) aft; Full load: 8 ft 3 in (2.51 m) forward; 14 ft 1 in (4.29 m) aft; Landing with 500 short tons (450 t) load: 3 ft 11 in (1.19 m) forward; 9 ft 10 in (3.00 m) aft; Limiting 11 ft 2 in (3.40 m); Maximum navigation 14 ft 1 in (4.29 m)
- Installed power: 2 × 900 hp (670 kW) Electro-Motive Diesel 12-567A diesel engines; 1,800 shp (1,300 kW)
- Propulsion: 1 × Falk main reduction gears; 2 × Propellers
- Speed: 11.6 kn (21.5 km/h; 13.3 mph)
- Range: 24,000 nmi (44,000 km; 28,000 mi) at 9 kn (17 km/h; 10 mph) while displacing 3,960 long tons (4,024 t)
- Boats & landing craft carried: 2 x LCVPs
- Capacity: 1,600–1,900 short tons (3,200,000–3,800,000 lb; 1,500,000–1,700,000 kg) cargo depending on mission
- Troops: 16 officers, 147 enlisted men
- Complement: 13 officers, 104 enlisted men
- Armament: Varied, ultimate armament; 2 × twin 40 mm (1.57 in) Bofors guns; 4 × single 40 mm Bofors guns; 12 × 20 mm (0.79 in) Oerlikon cannons

Service record
- Part of: LST Flotilla 8
- Operations: Western New Guinea operations; Morotai landing (15 September 1944); Leyte landings (5–18 November 1944); Lingayen Gulf landings (4–17 January 1945); Consolidation and capture of Southern Philippines; Mindanao Island landings (17–23 April 1945); Borneo operations; Balikpapan operation (28 June–10 July 1945)
- Awards: Combat Action Ribbon; American Campaign Medal; Asiatic–Pacific Campaign Medal; World War II Victory Medal; Navy Occupation Service Medal w/Asia Clasp; Philippine Republic Presidential Unit Citation; Philippine Liberation Medal

USS LST-911 was an LST-542-class tank landing ship in the United States Navy. Like many of her class, she was not named and is properly referred to by her hull designation.

== Construction ==
LST-911 was laid down on 28 February 1944, at Hingham, Massachusetts, by the Bethlehem-Hingham Shipyard; launched on 12 April 1944; sponsored by Mrs. Christine Muir; and commissioned on 14 May 1944.

== Service history ==
Underway the next day, LST-911 sailed to Little Creek, Virginia., arriving there on 23 May, to commence two weeks of shakedown exercises. With those evolutions complete on 4 June, the LST received five days of shipyard availability at Norfolk. After loading 500 short tons (1,000,000 lb; 450,000 kg) of dry stores, she proceeded to New York City, and moored at Pier 80 on 12 June. Embarking five LCT sections and 31 LCT crewmen soon thereafter, the tank landing ship got underway for the Panama Canal Zone on 25 June.

=== Transfer to the Pacific ===
Following stops at Guantánamo Bay and Coco Solo, the LST transited the Panama Canal on 9 July. Proceeding west, she made fueling stops at Bora Bora and Nouméa before anchoring in Seeadler Harbor, Manus Island, on 23 August, to unload stores and equipment. After refueling and loading 42 short tons (84,000 lb; 38,000 kg) of cargo for Dobbin, the tank landing ship sailed to Humboldt Bay, New Guinea, and finished transferring supplies to the destroyer tender on 7 September.

=== New Guinea Operations ===
Shifting to Maffin Bay, New Guinea, on 13 September, LST-911 loaded 490 short tons (980,000 lb; 440,000 kg) of US Army cargo (mostly vehicles) and sailed to Morotai, beaching there and unloading supplies without incident on 19 September. The tank landing ship made a second supply run 26 September to 1 October, unloading 550 short tons (1,100,000 lb; 500,000 kg) of bulk cargo in Pitoe Bay before returning to Humboldt Bay.

=== Leyte operations ===
After loading 472 short tons (944,000 lb; 428,000 kg) of Army supplies on 14 October, LST-911 sailed to the Philippines to take part in the Sixth Army's landings there and disembarked her passengers and unloaded cargo at Cataison Point, Leyte, without incident on 22 October. During her second supply run, 6–12 November, as she was returning through San Pedro Bay, five Japanese planes attacked the anchorage. LST-911's guns joined the fusillade that shot down two of the attackers, splashing one not 400 yd (370 m) off the starboard bow.

On 28 November, a doctor and nine corpsmen reported on board, instantly transforming LST-911 into a casualty evacuation ship. Underway for Leyte on 29 November, as part of a reinforcement convoy, the LST's crew witnessed a series of Japanese aircraft attacks on the convoy on 5 December, including the torpedoing of freighter Antoine Saugraine. After unloading supplies the next day, the LST withdrew from the beach and anchored in San Pedro Bay. Three days later, she embarked 149 men and vehicles from the Australian No.3 Airfield Construction Squadron and sailed for Mindoro on 12 December. Although the convoy came under repeated attacks by Japanese planes, the tank landing ship received no damage and disembarked her passengers and unloaded her equipment on 15 December. While on a second run from Leyte, LST-911's convoy came under attack off Mindoro by a dozen kamikazes, which damaged her sister ships LST-460 and LST-749 as well as destroyer Foote; another kamikaze crashed freighter Juan de Fuca off Panay. After unloading her cargo on 22 December, the LST then evacuated 47 Army casualties and 13 survivors of LST-460 and transported them to Leyte, anchoring in San Pedro Bay on 24 December.

=== Luzon operations ===
After loading an LCVP and 500 tons of cargo, LST-911 proceeded for Lingayen Gulf on 4 January 1945. While a three-plane attack on the convoy was driven off without loss on 7 January, a Japanese plane dropped two bombs about 100 yd (91 m) off the starboard quarter soon after the convoy anchored in Lingayen Gulf on 9 January. The next morning a plane flew straight over the LST in the morning darkness, dropping two bombs that fell 50 ft (15 m) astern, shaking the ship but doing no damage. Finally, on 11 January, the LST finished unloading supplies and equipment and returned to Leyte with three casualties embarked. Intermittent air attacks kept the crew at battle stations over the next two days. LST-911 made a second supply run to Lingayen Gulf 21–27 January, returning to Leyte with 150 Army casualties on 5 February, and transferring them to Comfort and the Dutch hospital ship Maetsuycker over the next two days.

=== Southern Philippines operations ===
Departing Leyte on 16 February, LST-911 sailed to Morotai where she embarked elements of the 84th Naval Construction Battalion. Underway on 28 February, the tank landing ship disembarked those troops and unloaded supplies at Palawan Island, Philippines, on 13 March. She then embarked 26 Army casualties for transfer to Leyte. Later in the month, the LST proceeded to Biak Island where she loaded an Army artillery battery for transport to Morotai, an evolution completed on 6 April. She then sailed to Sansapor Harbor, New Guinea, and loaded another artillery battery, lifting them to Mindanao, Philippines, on 23 April. Returning to Morotai on 26 April, LST-911 conducted one more ferry operation, the transfer of vehicles and cargo between Saidor and Finschafen, New Guinea in mid-May, before sailing south to Cairns, Australia, arriving there on 19 March.

=== Borneo operations ===
The LST loaded Australian Army medical cargo and vehicles a week later and got underway to Morotai, via Biak, on 30 May. With cargo unloaded on 13 June, LST-911 refueled before embarking Australian infantry, railway construction people, and petroleum experts for the invasion of Balikpapan, Borneo. Departing Morotai on 28 June, the LST disembarked the Australians in Balikpapan Bay on 5 July. Returning to Morotai, LST-911 made another ferry run to Balikpapan between 12 and 17 July. While there, the ship embarked the men of a US Army amphibious tractor unit and transported them to Manila Bay, Luzon, Philippines, between 21 and 27 July.

=== Occupation of Japan ===
After sailing to San Pedro Bay, Leyte, 28–31 July, the LST dry docked in ARD-19 to receive a coat of anti-corrosive paint on her hull on 2 August. LST-911 spent the next two weeks idling as events unfolded in Japan, including the dropping of the atomic bombs on Hiroshima and Nagasaki. Following the announcement of the armistice ending the Pacific War on 15 August, the tank landing ship sailed to Morotai where she loaded US Army Air Corps cargo. After delivery to Subic Bay, Luzon, on 7 September, the LST loaded Army cargo in Batangas Bay, Luzon, on 18 September and sailed for Japan.

Reaching Tokyo Bay on 29 September, LST-911 spent two days there before shifting to Shiogama, Japan, where her Army cargo was unloaded by 7 October. She then shifted cargo from Shiogama to Senami by 16 October, before returning to Tokyo Bay on 21 October. The tank landing ship departed Japan on 24 October and sailed for the Philippines.

== Decommissioning and fate ==
The LST performed occupation duty in the Far East until April 1946, when she returned to Seattle, Washington, for inactivation. LST-911 decommissioned at Seattle on 24 June 1946, and was struck from the Naval Vessel Register on 31 July 1946. On 25 September 1947, the ship was sold to the Puget Sound Bridge & Dredging Co., Seattle, Washington, for scrapping.

== Awards ==
LST-911 earned four battle star for World War II service.

== Bibliography ==
Online resources

- "LST-911". Dictionary of American Naval Fighting Ships. Naval History and Heritage Command. 4 August 2015. This article incorporates text from this source, which is in the public domain.
- "Bethlehem-Hingham, Hingham MA". www.ShipbuildingHistory.com. 11 August 2011.
- "USS LST-911". NavSource. 17 February 2017.
