= USS Mercy =

Three hospital ships of the United States Navy have borne the name USS Mercy, in honor of the virtue of compassion (and owing to their purpose).

- USS Mercy (AH-4), was built in 1907 as Saratoga and was commissioned Mercy (ID-1305) on 24 January 1918, before being re-designated AH-4 in 1920. She served in the Atlantic Fleet during World War I.
- USS Mercy (AH-8), was a Comfort-class hospital ship commissioned on 7 August 1944. She served during World War II.
- USNS Mercy (T-AH-19), was placed in service in 1986 and served during the Gulf War, as well as numerous Humanitarian Assistance Missions. She is currently in active service.

== See also ==
- USNS Comfort (T-AH-20)
- MV Global Mercy, a civilian hospital ship run by the international charity NGO Mercy Ships
