= AH1 (disambiguation) =

AH-1 or variant may refer to:

== Minor planets ==
- 1981 AH1, or 2684 Douglas
- 1983 AH1, or 4783 Wasson
- 1991 AH1, or 8166 Buczynski
- 1994 AH1, or 7257 Yoshiya
- 1996 AH1, or 37699 Santini-Aichl
- 2002 AH1, or 95008 Ivanobertini

== Vehicles ==
- Bell Huey derived attack helicopters:
  - Bell AH-1 Cobra, single engine attack helicopter
  - Bell AH-1 SuperCobra, dual engine attack helicopter
  - Bell 309 KingCobra, attack helicopter
- USS Relief (AH-1), a hospital ship

== Other uses ==
- AH1, longest route of the Asian Highway Network
