= AHS Centaur =

Australian hospital ship

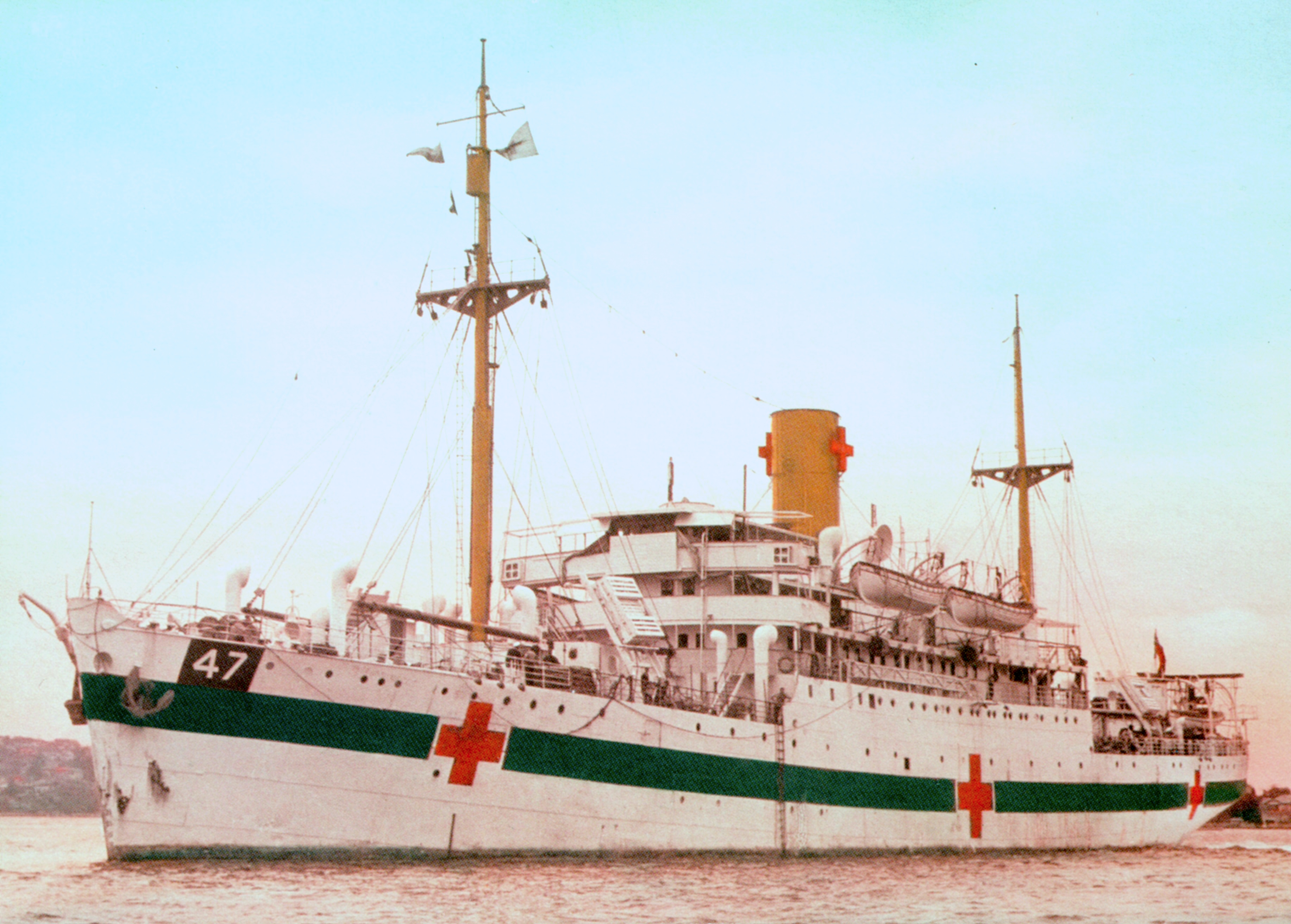
- AHS Centaur following her conversion to a hospital ship. The Red Cross designation "47" can be seen on the bow.

History

United Kingdom
- Name: Centaur
- Namesake: The Greek mythological creature
- Owner: Ocean Steamship Company
- Operator: Blue Funnel Line
- Ordered: 1923
- Builder: Scotts Shipbuilding & Engineering Company, Greenock, Scotland
- Laid down: 16 November 1923
- Launched: 5 June 1924
- Completed: 29 August 1924
- Home port: Liverpool, England (registered); Fremantle, Western Australia (actual)
- Identification: United Kingdom Official Number 147275
- Fate: Transferred to Australia

General characteristics as merchant vessel
- Tonnage: 3,222 GRT
- Length: 96 m (315 ft)
- Beam: 14.7 m (48 ft)
- Draught: 6.1 m (20 ft)
- Propulsion: double screw; 4-stroke, 6-cylinder Burmeister & Wain diesel oil engine providing 1,400 bhp (1,000 kW)
- Speed: 20.5 knots (38.0 km/h; 23.6 mph)
- Capacity: 72 passengers (50 first class, 22 second class); 450 cattle; Cargo in four holds
- Crew: 39 officers, 29 ratings
- Armament: Installed in 1939: 1 × 4-inch (100 mm) Mark IX naval gun, 2 × .303 Vickers machine guns, 2 × paravanes, degaussing equipment

Australia
- Name: Centaur
- Operator: 2nd Australian Imperial Force
- Acquired: 4 January 1943
- Reclassified: Hospital ship
- Home port: Sydney
- Identification: Red Cross Ship 47
- Fate: Torpedoed on 14 May 1943 by Japanese submarine I-177

General characteristics as hospital ship
- Capacity: 252 bed-patients
- Crew: 75 crew, 65 permanent Army medical staff
- Armament: All weapons removed, degaussing equipment remained

AHS Centaur was a hospital ship which was attacked and sunk by a Japanese submarine off the coast of Queensland, Australia, on 14 May 1943. Of the 332 medical personnel and civilian crew aboard, 268 died, including 63 of the 65 army personnel.

Completed in Scotland by Scotts Shipbuilding & Engineering Company as a combination passenger liner and refrigerated cargo ship in 1924, it operated between Western Australia and Singapore via the Dutch East Indies, carrying passengers, cargo, and livestock. At the start of World War II, Centaur, like all British Merchant Navy vessels) was placed under Admiralty control, but after being fitted with defensive equipment, was allowed to continue normal operations. In November 1941, the ship rescued German survivors of the engagement between Kormoran and HMAS Sydney. Centaur was relocated to Australia's east coast in October 1942, and used to transport materiel to New Guinea.

In January 1943, Centaur was handed over to the Australian military for conversion to a hospital ship, as her small size made her suitable for operating in Maritime Southeast Asia. The refit (including installation of medical facilities and repainting with Red Cross markings) was completed in March, and the ship undertook a trial voyage: transporting wounded from Townsville to Brisbane, then from Port Moresby to Brisbane. After replenishing in Sydney, Centaur embarked on the 2/12th Field Ambulance for transport to New Guinea, and sailed on 12 May. Before dawn on 14 May 1943, during her second voyage, Centaur was torpedoed and sunk by a Japanese submarine off Moreton Island, Queensland. The majority of the 332 aboard died in the attack; the 64 survivors were discovered 36 hours later. The incident resulted in public outrage as attacking a hospital ship is considered a war crime under the 1907 Hague Convention. Protests were made by the Australian and British governments to Japan, and efforts were made to discover the people responsible so they could be tried at a war crimes tribunal. In the 1970s the probable identity of the attacking submarine, I-177, became public.

The reason for the attack is unknown; there are theories that Centaur was in breach of the international conventions that should have protected her, that I-177's commander was unaware that Centaur was a hospital ship, or that the submarine commander, Hajime Nakagawa, knowingly attacked a protected vessel. The wreck of Centaur was found on 20 December 2009; a claimed discovery in 1995 has been proven to be a different shipwreck.

== Design and construction ==
=== Original design ===
In early 1923, the Ocean Steamship Company, a subsidiary of the Blue Funnel Line, decided that a new vessel would be required to replace the ageing Charon on the Western Australia to Singapore trade route. The vessel had to be capable of simultaneously transporting passengers, cargo, and livestock. She also had to be capable of resting on mud flats out of the water, as the tidal variance in ports at the northern end of Western Australia was as great as 8 metres (26 ft).

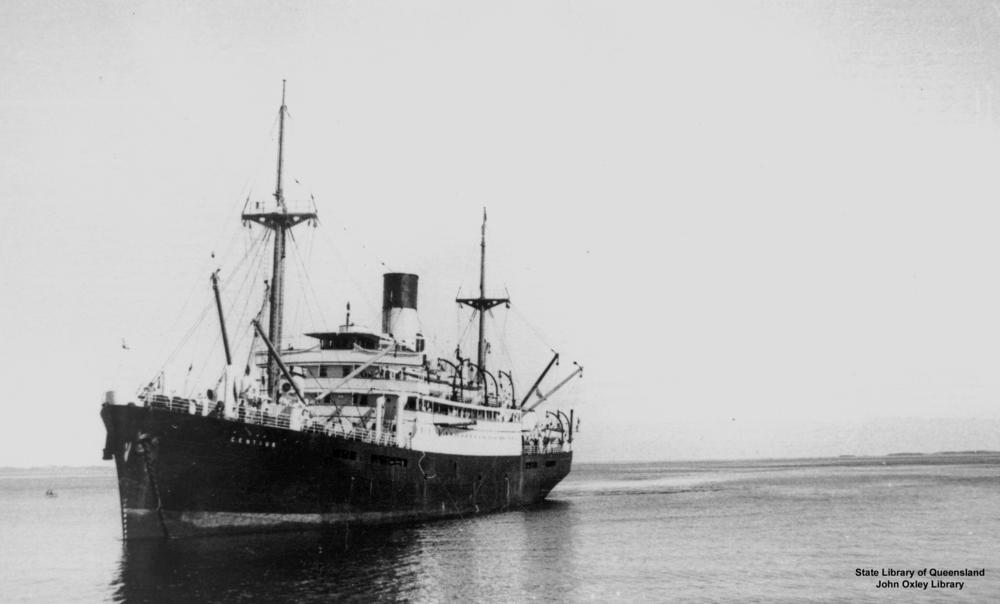
Centaur underway

Scotts Shipbuilding & Engineering Company in Greenock was chosen to build Centaur. The keel was laid on 16 November 1923, and the ship was ready for collection by 29 August 1924. Constructed at a cost of £146,750 sterling, Centaur was designed to carry 72 passengers and 450 cattle. Cargo was carried in four holds; the two decks within the hull were primarily for livestock, and could also be used as extra cargo space. The hull of the ship was a 'turret deck' design; decks below the waterline were wider than those above water, and a flat, reinforced hull allowed the ship to rest on the bottom. Centaur was among the first civilian vessels to be equipped with a diesel engine. One of the most visible characteristics was the 35-foot (11 m) smokestack, the extreme size was more a concession to tradition than of practical advantage on a diesel-powered vessel. Her engine was 6-cylinder 4-stroke single cycle single action diesel engine. It had cylinders of 2415/16 inches (64 cm) diameter by 513/16 inches (135 cm) stroke. The engine was built by Burmeister & Wain, Copenhagen, Denmark. One of her holds was fitted with refrigeration equipment. The refrigerant was brine and the insulation was cork. The refrigerated hold had a capacity of 3,000 cubic feet (85 m^{3}).

In December 1939, Centaur underwent a minor refit in Hong Kong, with a supercharger and a new propeller fitted to the engine. The supercharger broke down in April 1942, and could not be repaired because of equipment shortages and restricted dockyard access caused by World War II.

=== Hospital ship refit ===
At the beginning of 1943, Centaur was placed at the disposal of the Australian Department of Defence for conversion to a hospital ship. The conversion was performed by United Ship Services in Melbourne and was initially estimated to cost AU£20,000.

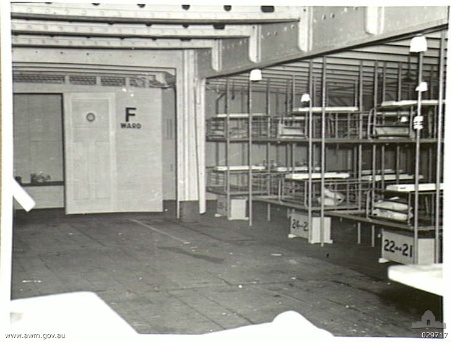
One of Centaur's wards shortly after her conversion to a hospital ship

The cost increased to almost AU£55,000, for a variety of reasons. It was originally intended for the ship to travel between ports in New Guinea and Townsville, Australia. Increasing casualty numbers in the New Guinea campaign meant that the hospitals in Queensland would quickly become unable to deal with the quantity of the casualties and the nature of their injuries, so a longer voyage to Sydney was required. The Army demanded that more facilities and conversions be added to the original plans such as expanded bathing and washing facilities, hot water made available to all parts of the ship through installation of a calorifier, the rerouting of all steam pipes away from patient areas, and ventilation arrangements suitable for tropical conditions. The unions representing the ship's crew requested improved living and dining conditions, including new sinks in the food preparation areas and the replacement of flooring in the quarters and mess rooms.

When AHS Centaur was relaunched on 12 March 1943, she was equipped with an operating theatre, dispensary, two wards (located on the former cattle decks), and a dental surgery, along with quarters for seventy five crew and sixty five permanent Army medical staff. To maintain the ship's mean draught of 6.1 metres (20 ft), 900 tons of ironstone were distributed through the cargo holds as ballast. AHS Centaur was capable of voyages of 18 days before resupply and could carry just over 250 bedridden patients.

== Operational history ==
=== 1924 to 1938 ===
Centaur was allocated the United Kingdom Official Number 147275 and the Code Letters KHHC. Her port of registry was Liverpool. When Centaur entered service at the end of 1924, the Fremantle–Java– Singapore trade route was being serviced by two other Blue Funnel Line vessels; Gorgon (which remained in service until 1928) and Charon (which Centaur was replacing). Centaur's route ran from Fremantle up the Western Australian coast calling at Geraldton, Carnarvon, Onslow, Point Samson, Port Hedland, Broome, and Derby then to the Bali Strait, Surabaya, Semarang, Batavia, and Singapore. Centaur operated as a cross between a tramp steamer and a freight liner; she travelled a set route, but stops at ports along the route varied between journeys. From 1928 until sometime in the 1930s, Centaur remained alone on her route, but the increase in trade along this route prompted Blue Funnel Line to reassign Gorgon and assign the new Charon to work alongside Centaur.

Following the change in Code Letters in 1934, Centaur was allocated the Code Letters GMQP. A highlight of Centaur's pre-war career was the rescue of the 385 ton Japanese whale-chaser Kyo Maru II in November 1938. Kyo Maru II had developed boiler problems while returning from the Antarctic and was drifting towards the Houtman Abrolhos Archipelago, where she was in danger of being wrecked by the reefs in the area. Centaur responded to the distress signal and towed Kyo Maru II to Geraldton.

=== 1939 to 1942 ===
As a vessel of the British Merchant Navy, Centaur was affected by the British Parliament's 1939 outline of how the Merchant Navy would respond to the declaration of war, primarily submission to the Admiralty in all matters excluding the crewing and management of vessels. Following the outbreak of World War II on 3 September 1939, Centaur was equipped with a stern-mounted 4-inch (100 mm) Mark IX naval gun and two .303 Vickers machine guns located on the bridge wings for protection against Axis warships and aircraft. She was also fitted with port and starboard paravanes and degaussing equipment for protection against naval mines. The weapons were removed during the hospital ship refit, although the anti-mine countermeasures remained. Centaur initially remained in service on her original trade route.

On 26 November 1941, a damaged lifeboat carrying 62 Kriegsmarine sailors and officers was spotted by an aircraft looking for the missing Australian cruiser HMAS Sydney; the aircraft directed Centaur to the lifeboat. Upon encountering the lifeboat, food was lowered to its occupants, and one person was allowed on board to explain the situation. Initially posing as a Norwegian merchant navy officer, the man quickly revealed that he was the first officer of the German auxiliary cruiser Kormoran and that the lifeboat contained German survivors from Kormoran's battle with HMAS Sydney seven days earlier, including Captain Theodor Detmers.

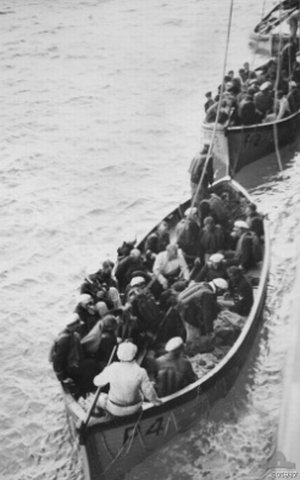
Survivors from Kormoran under tow in two of Centaur's lifeboats. The German lifeboat can be seen behind them.

Unwilling to leave the shipwrecked men at sea, but afraid of having his ship captured by the Germans, Centaur's master decided to take the lifeboat in tow, after allowing nine wounded men aboard. During the tow towards Carnarvon, Western Australia, the lifeboat was swamped and partially sunk by rough seas, so two of Centaur's lifeboats were lowered to carry the Germans. On arrival in Carnarvon, the Germans were relocated to the number one cargo hold, where they were joined by another hundred Kormoran survivors collected by other ships, plus forty Australian Army guards, which were then transported by Centaur to Fremantle.

Following the Japanese attack on Pearl Harbor and the beginning of the Malayan Campaign on 7 December 1941, Centaur's run was curtailed to Broome, Western Australia. On 6 October 1942, Centaur was ordered to sail to Queensland, where she began runs between the east coast of Australia and New Guinea, carrying materiel.

=== 1943 ===
With the commencement of hostilities between Japan and the British Empire, it became clear that the three hospital ships currently serving Australia—Manunda, Wanganella and Oranje—would not be able to operate in the shallow waters typical of Maritime Southeast Asia, so a new hospital ship was required. Of the Australian Merchant Navy vessels able to operate in this region, none were suitable for conversion to a hospital ship, and a request to the British Ministry of Shipping placed Centaur at the disposal of the Australian military on 4 January 1943. The conversion work began on 9 January and Centaur was commissioned as an Australian Hospital Ship on 1 March. During her conversion, Centaur was painted with the markings of a hospital ship as detailed in Article 5 of the tenth Hague Convention of 1907 ("Adaptation to Maritime War of the Principles of the Geneva Convention"); white hull with a green band interspersed by three red crosses on each flank of the hull, white superstructure, multiple large red crosses positioned so that the ship's status would be visible from both sea and air, and an identification number (for Centaur, 47) on her bows. At night, the markings were illuminated by a combination of internal and external lights. Data on the ship's markings and the layout of identifying structural features was provided to the International Committee of the Red Cross during the first week of February 1943, who passed this on to the Japanese on 5 February. This information was also circulated and promoted by the press and media.

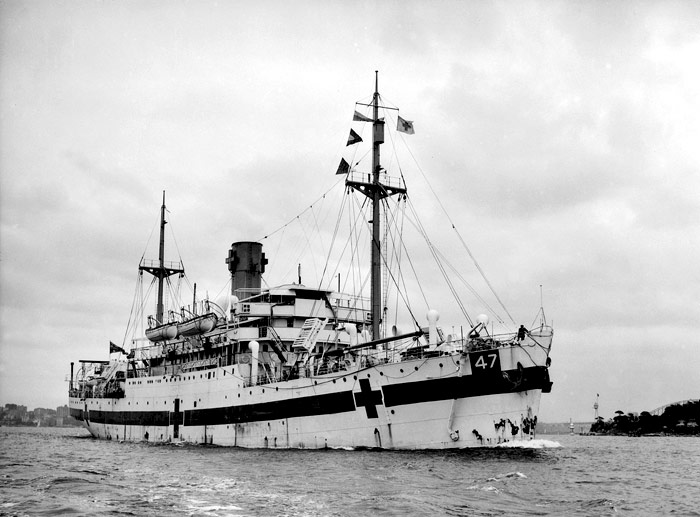
AHS Centaur in Sydney Harbour

Centaur entered operation as a hospital ship on 12 March 1943. The early stages of Centaur's first voyage as a hospital ship were test and transport runs; the initial run from Melbourne to Sydney resulted in the Master, Chief Engineer, and Chief Medical Officer composing a long list of defects requiring attention. Following repairs, she conducted a test run, transporting wounded servicemen from Townsville to Brisbane to ensure that she was capable of fulfilling the role of a medical vessel. Centaur was then tasked with delivering medical personnel to Port Moresby, New Guinea, and returning to Brisbane with Australian and American wounded along with a few wounded Japanese prisoners of war.

Arriving in Sydney on 8 May 1943, Centaur was re-provisioned at Darling Harbour, before departing for Cairns, Queensland on 12 May 1943. From there, her destination was again New Guinea. On board at the time were 74 civilian crew, 53 Australian Army Medical Corps personnel (including 8 officers), 12 female nurses from the Australian Army Nursing Service, 192 soldiers from the 2/12th Field Ambulance, and one Torres Strait ship pilot. Most of the female nurses had transferred from the hospital ship Oranje, and the male Army personnel assigned to the ship aboard were all medical staff. During the loading process, there was an incident when the ambulance drivers attached to the 2/12th attempted to bring their rifles and personal supplies of ammunition aboard. This was met with disapproval from Centaur's Master and Chief Medical Officer, and raised concerns amongst the crew and wharf labourers that Centaur would be transporting military supplies or commandos to New Guinea: the rifles were not allowed on board until Centaur's Master received official reassurance that the ambulance drivers were allowed to carry weapons under the 10th Hague Convention (specifically Article 8), as they were used "for the maintenance of order and the defence of the wounded." The remaining cargo was searched by the crew and labourers for other weapons and munitions.

== Sinking ==
At approximately 4:10 am on 14 May 1943, while on her second run from Sydney to Port Moresby, Centaur was torpedoed by an unsighted submarine. The torpedo struck the portside oil fuel tank approximately 2 metres (6 ft 7 in) below the waterline, creating a hole 8 to 10 metres (26 to 33 ft) across, igniting the fuel, and setting the ship on fire from the bridge aft. Many of those on board were immediately killed by concussion or perished in the inferno. Centaur quickly took on water through the impact site, rolled to port, then sank bow-first, submerging completely in less than three minutes. The rapid sinking prevented the deployment of lifeboats, although two broke off from Centaur as she sank, along with several damaged liferafts.

According to the position extrapolated by Second Officer Gordon Rippon from the 4:00 am dead reckoning position, Centaur was attacked approximately 24 nautical miles (44 km; 28 mi) east-northeast of Point Lookout, North Stradbroke Island, Queensland. Doubts were initially cast on the accuracy of both the calculated point of sinking and the dead reckoning position, but the 2009 discovery of the wreck found both to be correct, Centaur located within 1 nautical mile (1.9 km; 1.2 mi) of Rippon's coordinates.

=== Survivors ===
Survivor breakdown
Group	Embarked	Survived
Crew (Note: Crew figures include the Torres Strait pilot assigned to Centaur.)	75	30
Army officers	8	0
Army nurses	12	1
2/12th Field Ambulance	192	32
Other Army	45	1
Total	332	64

Of the 332 people on board, 64 were rescued. Most of the crew and passengers were asleep at the time of the attack and thus had little chance to escape. It is estimated that up to 200 people may have still been alive at the time Centaur slipped beneath the waves. Several people who made it off the ship alive later died from shrapnel wounds or burns; others were unable to keep themselves afloat without support and eventually drowned.

The survivors spent 36 hours in the water, using barrels, wreckage, and the two damaged lifeboats for flotation. During this time, they drifted approximately 19.6 nautical miles (36.3 km; 22.6 mi) north east of Centaur's calculated point of sinking and spread out over an area of 2 nautical miles (3.7 km; 2.3 mi). The survivors saw at least four ships and several aircraft during this time, but were unable to attract their attention.

At the time of rescue, the survivors were in two large and three smaller groups, with several more floating alone. Amongst those rescued were Sister Ellen Savage, the only surviving nurse from the 12 aboard; Leslie Outridge, the only surviving doctor of the 18 aboard; Gordon Rippon, second officer and most senior surviving crew member; and Richard Salt, the Torres Strait ship pilot. In 1944, Ellen Savage was presented with the George Medal for providing medical care, boosting morale, and displaying meritorious courage during the wait for rescue.

=== Rescue ===
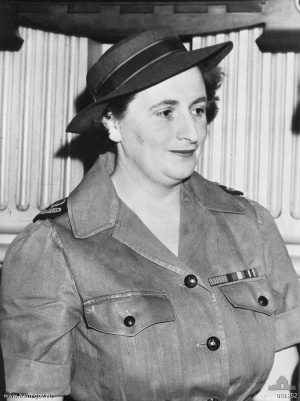
Sister Ellen Savage was the sole survivor of the 12 female nurses on board Centaur.

On the morning of 15 May 1943, the American destroyer USS Mugford departed Brisbane to escort the 11,063 ton New Zealand freighter Sussex on the first stage of the latter's trans-Tasman voyage. At 2:00 pm, a lookout aboard Mugford reported an object on the horizon. Around the same time, a Royal Australian Air Force (RAAF) Avro Anson of No. 71 Squadron, flying ahead on anti-submarine watch, dived towards the object. The aircraft returned to the two ships and signalled that there were shipwreck survivors in the water requiring rescue. Mugford's commanding officer ordered Sussex to continue alone as Mugford collected the survivors. Marksmen were positioned around the ship to shoot sharks, and sailors stood ready to dive in and assist the wounded. Mugford's medics inspected each person as they came aboard and provided necessary medical care. The American crew learned from the first group of survivors that they were from the hospital ship Centaur.

At 2:14 pm, Mugford made contact with the Naval Officer-in-Charge in Brisbane, and announced that the ship was recovering survivors from Centaur at 27°03′S 154°12′E, the first that anyone in Australia had knowledge of the attack on the hospital ship. The rescue of the 64 survivors took an hour and twenty minutes, although Mugford remained in the area until dark, searching an area of approximately 7 by 14 nautical miles (13 by 26 km; 8 by 16 mi) for more survivors. After darkness fell, Mugford returned to Brisbane, arriving shortly before midnight. Further searches of the waters off North Stradbroke Island were made by USS Helm during the night of 15 May until 6:00 pm on 16 May, and by HMAS Lithgow and four motor torpedo boats from 16 to 21 May, neither search finding more survivors.

=== Identifying attacker ===
At the time of the attack, none aboard Centaur witnessed what had attacked the ship. Due to the ship's position, the distance from shore, and the depth, it was concluded that she was torpedoed by one of the Japanese submarines known to be operating off the Australian east coast. Several survivors later claimed to have heard the attacking submarine moving on the surface while they were adrift, and the submarine was seen by the ship's cook, Francis Martin, who was floating alone on a hatch cover, out of sight from the main cluster of survivors. Martin described the submarine to Naval Intelligence following the survivors' return to land; his description matched the profile of a KD7 type Kaidai-class submarine of the Imperial Japanese Navy.

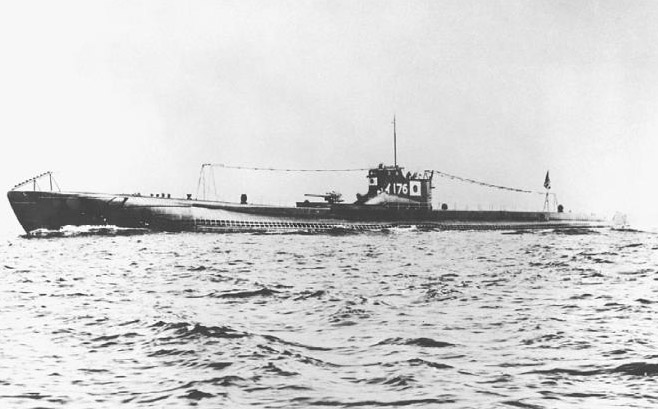
I-176, a KD7 type Kaidai-class submarine. The three suspected attackers were all of this type.

At the time of the attack, three KD7 Kaidai were operating off Australia's east coast: I-177 under the command of Hajime Nakagawa, I-178 under Hidejiro Utsuki, and I-180 under Toshio Kusaka. None of these submarines survived the war; I-177 was sunk by USS Samuel S. Miles on 3 October 1944, I-178 by USS Patterson on 25 August 1943, and I-180 by USS Gilmore on 26 April 1944. Kusaka and Nakagawa were transferred to other submarines before the loss of I-180 and I-177 respectively, but Utsuki and I-178 were sunk while returning from the patrol off the coast of Australia.

In December 1943, following official protests, the Japanese government issued a statement formally denying responsibility for the sinking of Centaur. Records provided by the Japanese following the war also did not acknowledge responsibility. Although Centaur's sinking was a war crime, no one was tried for sinking the hospital ship. Investigations into the attack were conducted between 1944 and 1948, and included the interrogation of the commanders of the submarines operating in Australian waters at the time, their superiors, plus junior officers and crewmen from the submarines who had survived the war. Several of the investigators suspected that Nakagawa and I-177 were most likely responsible, but they were unable to establish this beyond reasonable doubt, and the Centaur case file was closed on 14 December 1948 without any charges laid.

Historians were divided on which submarine was responsible. In Royal Australian Navy, 1942–1945, published in 1968 as part of the series detailing the Australian official history of World War II, George Hermon Gill concluded that either I-178 or I-180 was responsible; the former was more likely as she had served in Australian waters the longest of any Japanese submarine at the time, but had claimed no kills in the three-month period surrounding Centaur's sinking. In 1972, German military historian Jürgen Rohwer claimed in Chronology of the war at sea that I-177 torpedoed Centaur, based on a Japanese report stating that I-177 had attacked a ship on 14 May 1943 in the area the hospital ship had sunk. Japanese Rear Admiral Kaneyoshi Sakamoto, who had shown Rohwer the report, stated that Nakagawa and I-177 were responsible for the attack on Centaur in his 1979 book History of Submarine Warfare.

As an official history of the Japanese Navy, Sakamoto's work was considered to be official admission of the attacking submarine's identity. Subsequently, most sources assumed as fact Nakagawa's and I-177's role in the loss of Centaur. Nakagawa, who died in 1991, refused to speak about the attack on Centaur following the war crimes investigation at the end of World War II or even to defend himself or deny the claims made by Rohwer and Sakamoto.

== Reaction ==
=== Public reaction ===
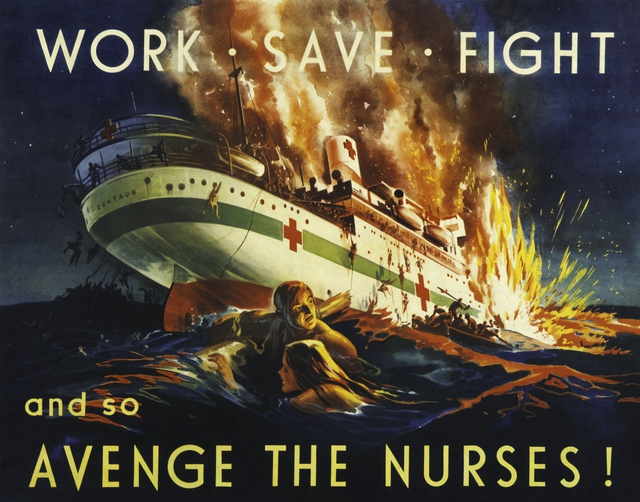
A propaganda poster calling for Australians to avenge the sinking of Centaur

The media were notified of Centaur's sinking on 17 May 1943, but were ordered not to release the news until it had been announced in the South West Pacific Area's General Headquarters dispatch at midday on 18 May, and in Parliament by Prime Minister John Curtin that afternoon. News of the attack made front pages throughout the world, including The Times of London, The New York Times, and the Montreal Gazette. In some newspapers, the news took precedence over the 'Dambuster' raids performed in Europe by No. 617 Squadron RAF.

The initial public reaction to the attack on Centaur was one of outrage, significantly different from that displayed following the loss of Australian warships or merchant vessels. As a hospital ship, the attack was a breach of the tenth Hague Convention of 1907, and as such was a war crime. The sinking of Centaur drew strong reactions from both Prime Minister Curtin and General Douglas MacArthur. Curtin stated that the sinking was "an entirely inexcusable act, undertaken in violation of the convention to which Japan is a party and of all the principles of common humanity". MacArthur reflected the common Australian view when he stated that the sinking was an example of Japanese "limitless savagery". Politicians urged the public to use their rage to fuel the war effort, and Centaur became a symbol of Australia's determination to defeat what appeared to be a brutal and uncompromising enemy. The Australian Government produced posters depicting the sinking, which called for Australians to "Avenge the Nurses" by working to produce materiel, purchasing war bonds, or enlisting in the armed forces.

People also expressed their sympathy towards the crew, and there were several efforts to fund a new hospital ship. The councillors of Caulfield, Victoria, organised a fund to replace the lost medical equipment, opening with a donation of AU£2,000. Those who worked on Centaur's conversion contributed money towards a replacement, and employees of Ansett Airways pledged to donate an hour's pay towards the fitting out of such a replacement.

With some people unable to believe that the Japanese would be so ruthless, rumours began to spread almost immediately after news of the attack was made public. The most common rumour was that Centaur had been carrying munitions or commandos at the time of her sinking, the Japanese being made aware of this before her departure. This stemmed from an incident involving the ambulance drivers' weapons during loading in Sydney.

=== Military reaction ===
The attack was universally condemned by Australian servicemen, who commonly believed that the attack on Centaur had been carried out deliberately and in full knowledge of her status. Similar reactions were expressed by other Allied personnel; United States Army Air Forces General George Kenney recalled having to talk a sergeant bombardier out of organising a retaliatory bombing run on a Japanese hospital ship known to be in their area.

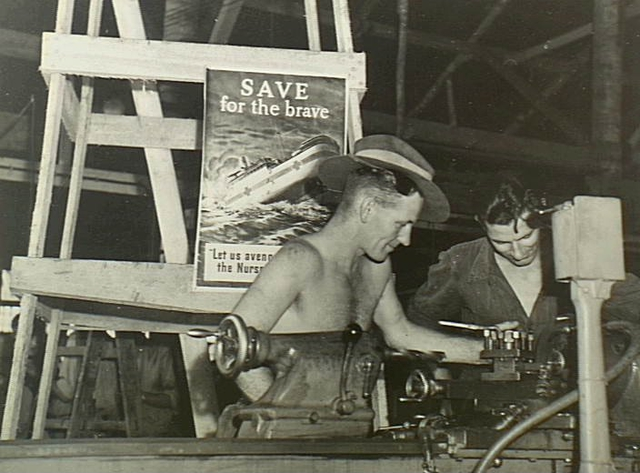
A war loan poster depicting the sinking of Centaur displayed at an Australian Army workshop in Lae, New Guinea, in September 1944

Six days after the attack on Centaur, a request was made by the Australian Department of Defence that the identification markings and lights be removed from Australian hospital ship Manunda, weapons be installed, and that she begin to sail blacked out and under escort. The conversion was performed, although efforts by the Department of the Navy, the Admiralty, and authorities in New Zealand and the United States of America caused the completed conversion to be undone. The cost of the roundabout work came to £12,500, and kept Manunda out of service for three months. On 9 June 1943, communications between the Combined Chiefs of Staff on the subject of hospital ships contained a section referring to the Manunda incident as a response to the attack on Centaur, with the conclusion that the attack was the work of an irresponsible Japanese commander, and that it would be better to wait until further attacks had been made before considering the removal of hospital ship markings.

When the consideration was made that the ambulance drivers' weapons incident just before Centaur's voyage may have been partially responsible for the attack, it led to the tightening of rules regarding who was allowed to travel on a hospital ship. Quasi-medical staff, like repatriation teams, were no longer permitted on hospital ships. Ambulance drivers had to transfer from the regular Army to the Australian Army Medical Corps before they were allowed aboard, although they were still permitted to carry their unloaded weapons and ammunition.

=== Official protests ===
After consultation with the Australian armed forces, General MacArthur, the Admiralty, and the Australian Government, an official protest was sent. This was received by the Japanese Government on 29 May 1943. At around the same time, the International Committee of the Red Cross sent a protest on behalf of the major Allied Red Cross organisations to the Japanese Red Cross.

On 26 December 1943, a response to the Australian protest arrived. It stated that the Japanese Government had no information justifying the allegation made, and therefore took no responsibility for what happened. The reply counter-protested that nine Japanese hospital ships had been attacked by the Allies, although these claims were directed against the United States, not Australia. Although several later exchanges were made, the lack of progress saw the British Government inform the Australian Prime Minister on 14 November 1944 that no further communications would be made on the loss of Centaur.

== Theories for attack ==
Torpedo attacks in Australian waters were common at this time, with 27 Japanese submarines operating in Australian waters between June 1942 and December 1944. These submarines attacked almost 50 merchant vessels, 20 ships confirmed to be sunk as result of a Japanese attack, plus 9 more unconfirmed. This was part of a concentrated effort to disrupt supply convoys from Australia to New Guinea.

Several actions on Centaur's part may have contributed to her demise. Centaur was under orders to sail well out to sea until reaching the Great Barrier Reef; her course keeping her between 50 and 150 nautical miles (90 and 280 km; 60 and 170 mi) from shore. Centaur's Master, believing he had been given a route intended for a merchant vessel, set a course closer to land, but on the seaward side of 2,000 metres (6,600 ft) in depth. Also, Centaur was sailing completely illuminated, with the exception of the two bow floodlights, which had been switched off as they interfered with visibility from the bridge.

There are three main theories as to why Centaur was attacked:

=== Legitimate target ===
This theory stems from the rumours spreading after Centaur's sinking. If Centaur had been in breach of the Hague Convention of 1907, and someone had informed the Japanese of this, I-177 may have been under valid orders to attack. When Centaur left Sydney, her decks were packed with green-uniformed men, and as Field Ambulance uniforms were only distinguishable from other Army uniforms by badge insignia and the colouration of the cloth band ringing the hat, a distant observer could have concluded that the hospital ship was transporting soldiers. Those witnessing the loading in Sydney would have seen the ambulance drivers bring their weapons aboard, and could have come to a similar conclusion. If a spy or informant had passed this information to the Japanese, I-177 could have been lying in wait. The main flaw in this theory is the question of how Nakagawa and his crew were able to predict that Centaur was taking an alternative route and how they were able to determine the new route selected.

Similar but later rumours included that during her first voyage, Centaur had transported soldiers to New Guinea, or Japanese prisoners of war back to Australia for interrogation, and consequently had been marked as a legitimate target by the Japanese. Centaur had carried 10 prisoners of war on her return voyage from New Guinea, but as they were all wounded personnel, transporting them on a hospital ship was legal.

=== Mistaken target ===
This theory states that Nakagawa was unaware that the vessel he was attacking was a hospital ship, and that the sinking was an unfortunate accident. This view was supported by several Japanese officers, both before and after the revelation that Nakagawa was responsible. Amongst them was Lieutenant Commander Zenji Orita, who took command of I-177 after Nakagawa. Orita did not hear anything from the crew about having sunk a hospital ship, not even rumours, and believed that if I-177 had knowingly attacked Centaur, he would have learned this from the crew's gossip.

When compared to the other contemporary Australian hospital ships, Centaur was the smallest, approximately a third of the size of Manunda or Wanganella. Centaur was also slightly shorter than I-177. The observation of Centaur was made through a periscope, and submarine officers attest that at 1,500 metres (4,900 ft), the optimum range of attack for World War II–era Japanese submarines, some officers would not be able to clearly identify a target ship's profile or hull markings. With Centaur's bow floodlights out, and with the observation of the target made through the periscope, there is a possibility Nakagawa would not have seen the hospital ship's markings if he had been in the wrong position. Apart from the two bow floodlights, Centaur was lit up brilliantly. To attack, I-177 would have had to approach from abeam of Centaur, which was illuminated by both its own lights and a full moon.

=== Intentional target ===
This theory states that Nakagawa was fully aware that his target was a hospital ship and decided to sink her regardless, either on his own initiative or on a poor interpretation of his orders. Researchers speculate that as Nakagawa was approaching the end of his tour in Australian waters, and had only sunk a single enemy vessel, the 8,742 ton freighter Limerick, he did not want to return with the disgrace of a single kill. Other claims include that Nakagawa may have been acting in vengeance for casualties inflicted by the Allies during the Battle of the Bismarck Sea, or may have expected praise for the sinking of an enemy naval vessel.

In February 1944, while in command of I-37, Nakagawa ordered the machine-gunning of survivors from three British merchant vessels torpedoed by his submarine (British Chivalry, on 22 February; Sutlej, on 24 February; and Ascot on 29 February). His defence, that he was acting under orders from Vice Admiral Shiro Takasu, was not accepted, and he was sentenced to four years imprisonment at Sugamo Prison as a Class B war criminal. These incidents showed that Nakagawa was willing to ignore the laws of war.

== Shipwreck ==
Following World War II, several searches of the waters around North Stradbroke and Moreton Islands failed to reveal Centaur's location. It was believed that she had sunk off the edge of the continental shelf, to a depth at which the Royal Australian Navy did not have the capability to search for a vessel of Centaur's size. Some parties also believed that Rippon's calculated point of sinking was inaccurate, either intentionally or through error.

Several points were incorrectly identified as the location where the Centaur sank. The first was in the War Diary Situation Report entry for the hospital ship's sinking, which gives 27°17′S 154°05′E, 7 nautical miles (13 km; 8.1 mi) east of Rippon's position. According to Milligan and Foley, this likely occurred because an estimated 50-nautical-mile (93 km; 58 mi) distance from Brisbane, included as a frame of reference, was interpreted literally. In 1974, two divers claimed to have found the ship approximately 40 nautical miles (74 km; 46 mi) east of Brisbane, in 60 metres (200 ft) of water, but did not disclose its exact location. Attempts to relocate the site between 1974 and 1992 were unsuccessful, an associate of the divers claiming that the Navy destroyed the wreck shortly after its discovery.

=== Dennis's claim ===
In 1995, it was announced that the shipwreck of Centaur had been located in waters 9 nautical miles (17 km; 10 mi) from the lighthouse on Moreton Island, a significant distance from her believed last position. The finding was reported on A Current Affair, during which footage of the shipwreck, 170 metres (560 ft) underwater, was shown. Discoverer Donald Dennis claimed the identity of the shipwreck had been confirmed by the Navy, the Queensland Maritime Museum, and the Australian War Memorial. A cursory search by the Navy confirmed the presence of a shipwreck at the given location, which was gazetted as a war grave and added to navigation charts by the Australian Hydrographic Office.

Over the next eight years, there was growing doubt about the position of Dennis' wreck, due to the distance from both Second Officer Rippon's calculation of the point of sinking and where USS Mugford found the survivors. During this time, Dennis had been convicted on two counts of deception and one of theft through scams. Two wreck divers, Trevor Jackson and Simon Mitchell, used the location for a four-hour world record dive on 14 May 2002, during which they examined the wreck and took measurements, claiming that the ship was too small to be Centaur. Jackson had been studying Centaur for some time, and believed that the wreck was actually another, much smaller ship, the 55-metre-long (180 ft) MV Kyogle, a lime freighter purchased by the Royal Australian Air Force and sunk during bombing practice on 12 May 1951. The facts gathered on the dive were inconclusive, but the divers remained adamant it was not Centaur, and passed this information onto Nick Greenaway, producer of the newsmagazine show 60 Minutes.

On the 60th anniversary of the sinking, 60 Minutes ran a story demonstrating that the wreck was not Centaur. It was revealed that nobody at the Queensland Maritime Museum had yet seen Dennis' footage, and when it was shown to Museum president Rod McLeod and maritime historian John Foley, they stated that the shipwreck could not be Centaur due to physical inconsistencies, such as an incorrect rudder. Following this story, and others published around the same time in newspapers, the Navy sent three ships to inspect the site over a two-month period; HMA Ships Hawkesbury, Melville, and Yarra, before concluding that the shipwreck was incorrectly identified as Centaur. An amendment was made to the gazettal, and the Hydrographic Office began to remove the mark from charts.

=== Discovery ===
In April 2008, following the successful discovery of HMAS Sydney, several parties began calling for a dedicated search for Centaur. By the end of 2008, the Australian Federal and Queensland State governments had formed a joint committee and contributed A$2 million each towards a search, and tenders to supply equipment (including the search vessel, side-scan sonar systems, and a remotely operated inspection submersible) were opened in February 2009, and awarded during the year. The search, conducted from the Defence Maritime Services vessel Seahorse Spirit and overseen by shipwreck hunter David Mearns, commenced during the weekend of 12–13 December 2009. The initial search area off Cape Moreton covered 1,365 square kilometres (527 sq mi), the search team being given 35 days to locate and film the wreck before funding was exhausted.

The bow of the Centaur wreck. The starboard anchor (centre), and the remains of the Red Cross identification number (above the anchor) can be seen.

Six sonar targets with similar dimensions to Centaur were located between 15 and 18 December: as none of the contacts corresponded completely to the hospital ship, the search team opted to take advantage of favourable weather conditions and continue investigating the area before returning to each site and making a detailed inspection with a higher-resolution sonar. On the afternoon of 18 December, the sonar towfish separated from the cable, and was lost in 1,800 metres (5,900 ft) of water, forcing the use of the high-resolution sonar to complete the area search. After inspecting the potential targets, Mearns and the search team announced on 20 December that they had found Centaur that morning.

The wreck was found at 27°16.98′S 153°59.22′E (30 nautical miles (56 km; 35 mi) east of Moreton Island, and less than 1 nautical mile (1.9 km; 1.2 mi) from Rippon's coordinates), resting 2,059 metres (6,755 ft) below sea level in a steep-walled gully, 150 metres (490 ft) wide and 90 metres (300 ft) deep. After returning to shore for Christmas and to install a remotely operated vehicle (ROV) aboard Seahorse Spirit, the search team commenced efforts to document the wreck, the first photographs being taken by the ROV in the early morning of 10 January 2010 confirming that the wreck is Centaur. Conditions for documenting the hospital ship were not optimal on the first ROV dive, and three more dives were made during 11 and 12 January. During the four dives, over 24 hours of footage were collected, along with several photographs: features identified during the operation include the Red Cross identification number, the hospital ship markings, and the ship's bell. The Centaur wreck site has been marked as a war grave and protected with a navigational exclusion zone under the Historic Shipwrecks Act 1976.

== Memorials ==
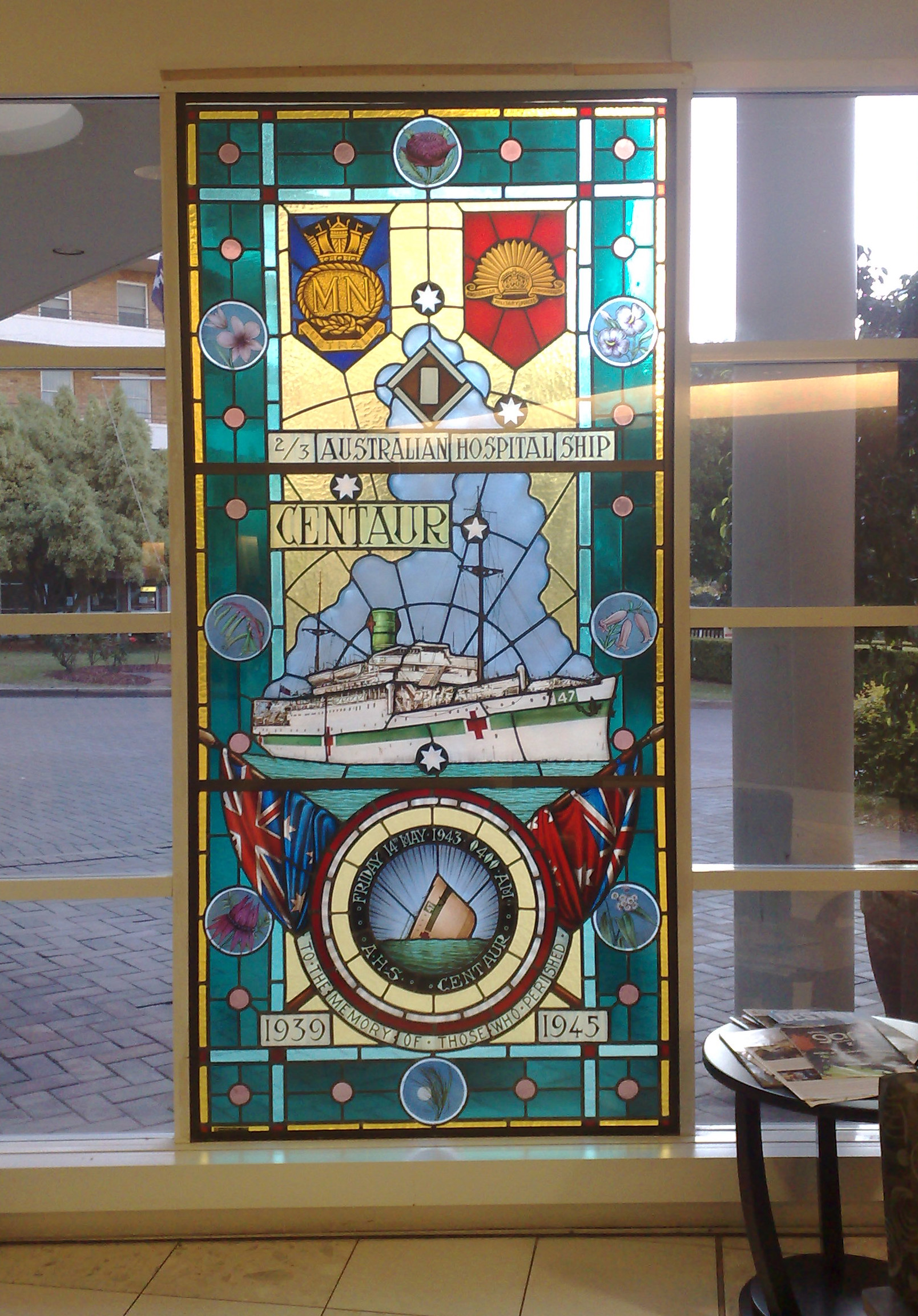
Stained glass window depicting AHS Centaur at Concord Repatriation General Hospital

In 1948, Queensland nurses established the "Centaur Memorial Fund for Nurses" which used the money raised to purchase an establishment and name it "Centaur House"; a facility supporting nurses by holding convivial meetings and providing inexpensive accommodation for out-of-town nurses. The original Centaur House was sold in 1971, a new building being purchased and renamed. The second Centaur House was sold in 1979 and although the fund still exists, it no longer owns a physical facility. On 15 September 1968, a cairn was unveiled at Caloundra, Queensland, erected by the local Rotary International Club. In 1990, a stained glass memorial window depicting Centaur, along with a plaque listing the names of those lost in the attack, was installed at Concord Repatriation General Hospital, at a cost of A$16,000. A display about Centaur was placed at the Australian War Memorial. The centrepiece of the display was a scale model of Centaur presented to the Memorial by Blue Funnel Line, and the display included items that were donated by the survivors, such as a lifejacket, a signal flare, and a medical kit. It was removed in 1992 to make way for a display related to the Vietnam War.

A memorial to Centaur was unveiled at Point Danger, Coolangatta, Queensland on 14 May 1993, the 50th anniversary of the sinking. It consists of a monumental stone topped with a cairn, surrounded by a tiled moat with memorial plaques explaining the commemoration. The memorial is surrounded by a park with a boardwalk, overlooking the sea, with plaques for other Merchant Navy and Royal Australian Navy vessels lost during World War II. The unveiling of the memorial was performed by Minister for Veterans' Affairs, Senator John Faulkner.

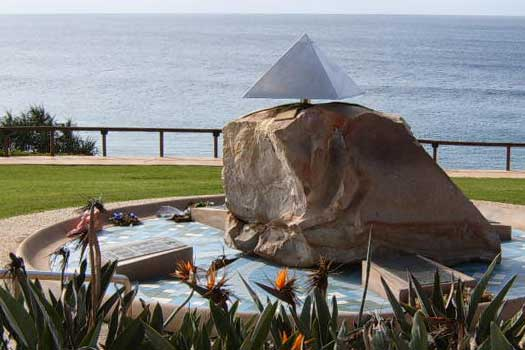
Centaur memorial at Point Danger, in Coolangatta, Queensland

A memorial plaque was laid on the foredeck of Centaur on 12 January 2010, during the fourth and final ROV dive on the hospital ship. This would normally be a breach of the Historic Shipwrecks Act, but a special dispensation permitted the manoeuvre, as placing the plaque on the seabed next to the ship would have seen it sink into the sediment. Following the ship's discovery, a national memorial service at St John's Cathedral, Brisbane on 2 March 2010 was attended by over 600 people, including Prime Minister Kevin Rudd. A second ceremony for 300 relatives of the hospital ship's personnel was held aboard HMAS Manoora on 24 September. During the service, which occurred over the wreck site, wreaths were laid and the ashes of three survivors were scattered.

The Centaur is also memoralised in the name of a school in New South Wales. Centaur Primary School, in the Northern Rivers suburb of Banora Point, was named after the ship, which features in the school's emblem.

== See also ==
- USS Hope (AH-7)
- USS Relief
- USS Comfort (AH-6)
- SS Op ten Noort
- Japanese war crimes
