= Trevor Jackson =

Trevor Jackson may refer to:

- Trevor Jackson (performer) (born 1996), American teen actor, singer, and dancer
- Trevor Jackson (musician), musician in British dance act Playgroup
- Trevor Jackson (diver) (born 1965), Australian technical diver, shipwreck researcher, author and inventor
