= Comfort-class hospital ship =

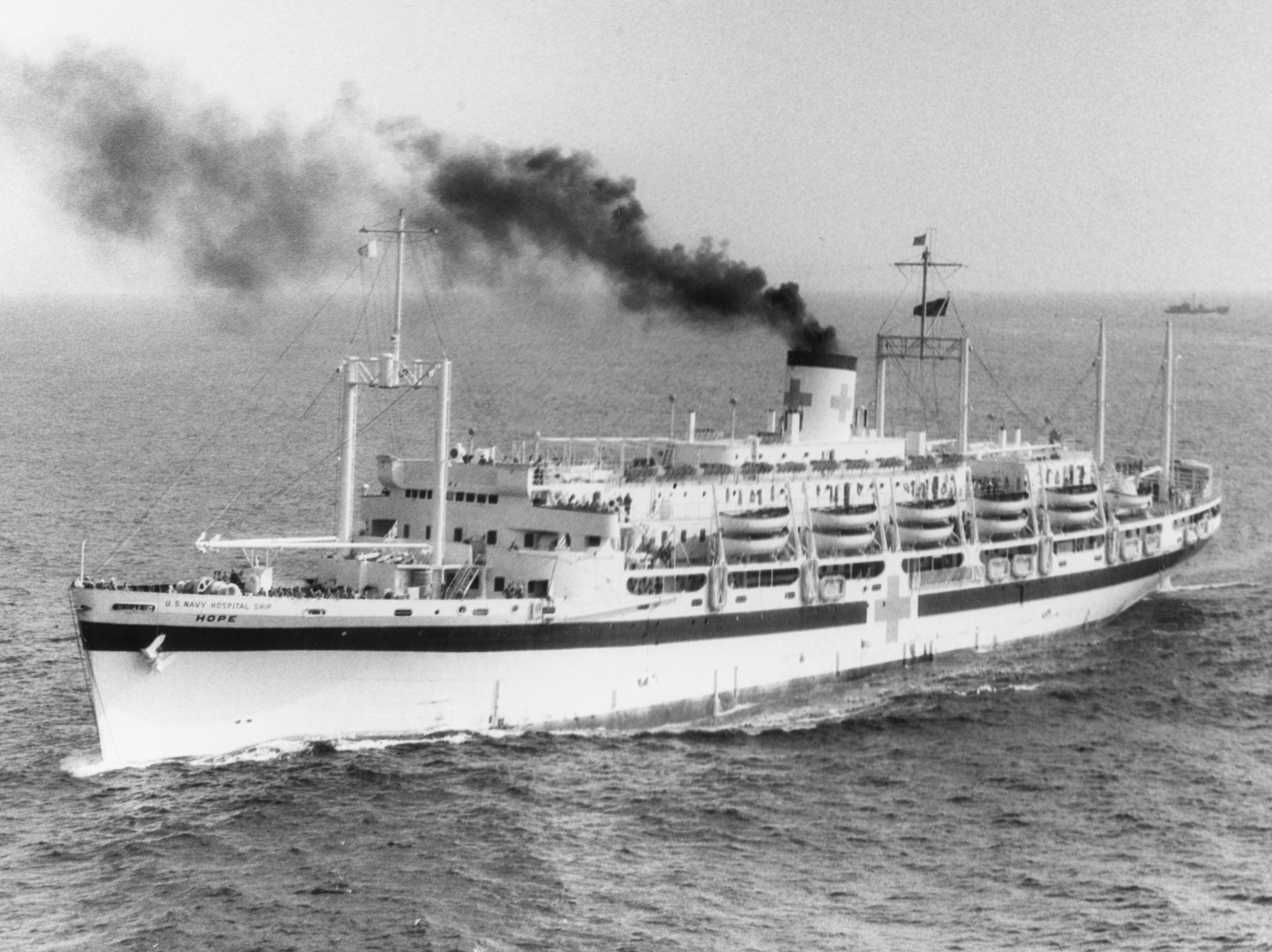
- USS Hope (AH-7)

Class overview
- Builders: Consolidated Steel Corporation
- Operators: United States Navy
- Built: 1943–1944
- In commission: 1944–1946
- Completed: 3

General characteristics
- Type: Hospital ship
- Displacement: 6,000 long tons (6,096 t) standard; 9,800 long tons (9,957 t) full load
- Length: 419 ft 9 in (127.94 m)
- Beam: 60 ft (18 m)
- Draft: 24 ft (7.3 m)
- Propulsion: Geared turbines, single screw
- Speed: 15.5 knots (28.7 km/h; 17.8 mph)
- Capacity: 400+ patients
- Complement: 516 crew

The Comfort-class hospital ships were a United States Navy World War II-era hospital ship design. Three vessels (Comfort, Hope, and Mercy) were built using these specifications. All ships were constructed in 1943 by the Consolidated Steel Corporation before being decommissioned in 1946.

Comfort operated with a navy crew and army medical personnel throughout its short career. All three ships of the class operated exclusively in the Pacific theater for the three years in which they were in service.

== Ships ==
- USS Comfort (AH-6)
- USS Hope (AH-7)
- USS Mercy (AH-8)

== See also ==
- SS United States, a planned fast hospital ship.
- Haven-class hospital ship
- Mercy-class hospital ship
- List of United States Navy hospital ships
