= USS Hope (AH-7) =

American Comfort-class hospital ship

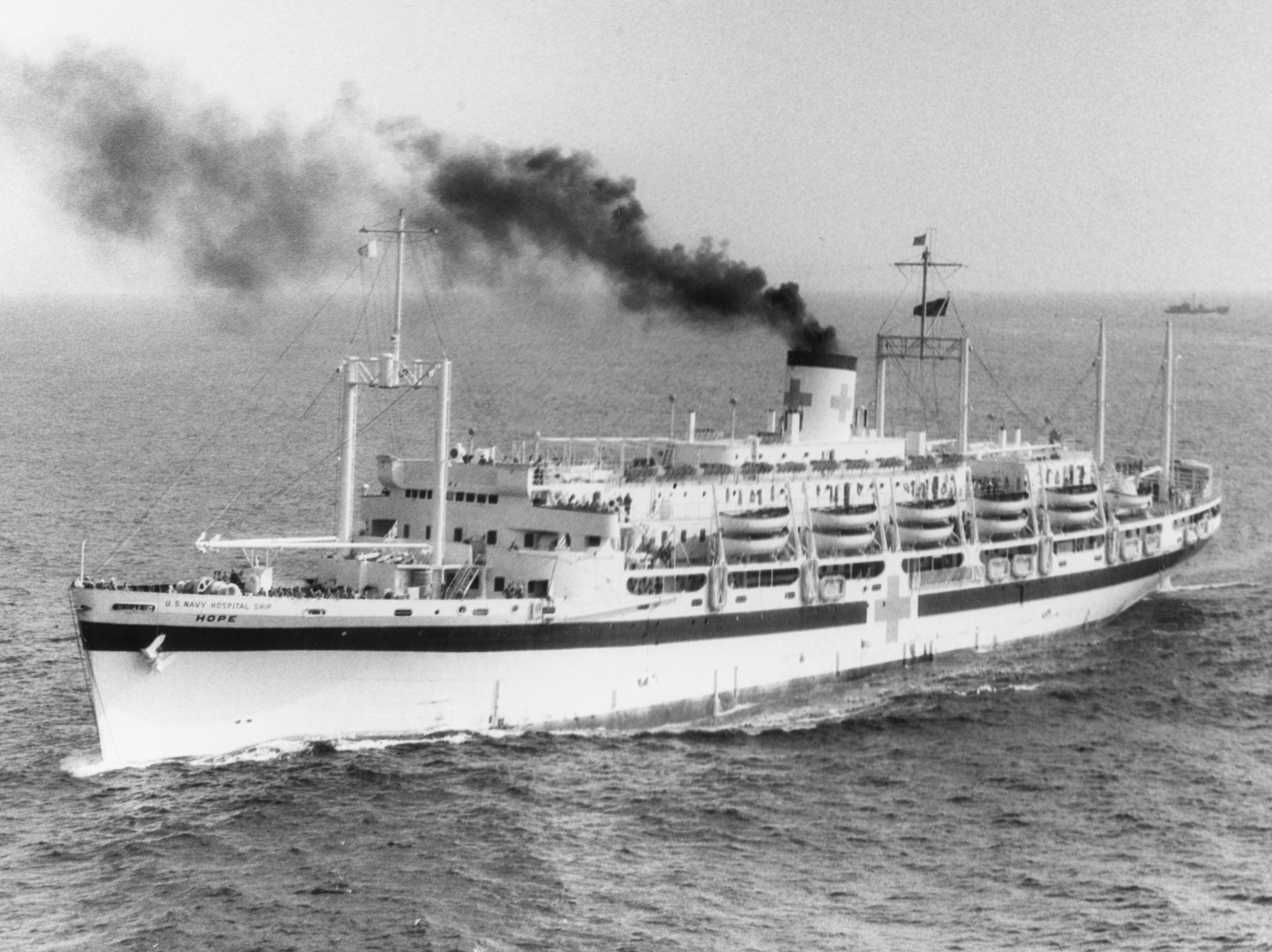
- USS Hope (AH-7)

History

United States
- Name: USS Hope
- Builder: Consolidated Steel Corporation; Wilmington, California
- Launched: 30 August 1943
- Sponsored by: Miss Martha L. Floyd
- Acquired: 30 August 1943
- Commissioned: 15 August 1944
- Decommissioned: 9 May 1946
- Nickname(s): Lucky 7
- Fate: Sold for scrap in 1978

General characteristics
- Class & type: Comfort-class hospital ship
- Displacement: 6,000 GRT, 9,800 GRT fully loaded
- Length: 419 ft 9 in (127.94 m)
- Beam: 60 ft (18 m)
- Draft: 24 ft (7.3 m)
- Propulsion: Geared Turbines, Single Screw
- Speed: 15.5 knots (28.7 km/h) (max)
- Capacity: 400+ patients
- Complement: 516 crew

USS Hope (AH-7) was a Comfort-class hospital ship launched under Maritime Commission contract by Consolidated Steel Corporation, Wilmington, California, 30 August 1943; sponsored by Miss Martha L. Floyd; acquired by the Navy the same day for conversion to a hospital ship by U.S. Naval Dry Dock, Terminal Island, Calif.; and commissioned 15 August 1944.

Hope was one of three hospital ships, the others being USS Comfort (AH-6) and USS Mercy (AH-8), built, commanded and crewed by the Navy for the Army. These ships, unlike the Navy hospital ships, were intended for evacuation and transport of patients after primary care had been given. Medical equipment and personnel were provided by the Army. The Army medical complement table of organization provided for the temporary reinforcement of the staff if the ship directly supported amphibious operations.

Hope completed her shakedown cruise and sailed 23 September 1944 to render medical care during the climactic phase of the campaign against Japan. Steaming via Pearl Harbor and Manus, the ship arrived Kossol Passage, in the Palaus, and received soldiers wounded taking the islands of the group.

American soldiers, supported by a vast naval task force, returned to the Philippines 20 October. Hope arrived Leyte Gulf 7 November, to care for casualties and evacuated them to Hollandia. Thereafter the ship made four more voyages to Leyte to evacuate wounded. During the morning of 3 December she was followed by a Japanese submarine, and that afternoon was attacked unsuccessfully by a torpedo plane. Three days later, as she steamed toward Manus, the hospital was again attacked by aircraft. One bomb was dropped close aboard but no damage resulted. Continuing to evacuate wounded from the Philippines, Hope arrived Subic Bay 16 February 1945, just as paratroopers landed on Corregidor. The ship sailed on to Lingayen Gulf for evacuation, and sailed from Leyte 6 March for Ulithi.

Hope sailed 9 April to take part in the Okinawa operation, arriving off the bitterly contested island 4 days later. During the next month she shuttled between Saipan and Okinawa, often under attack despite her distinctive markings. As Japanese suicide planes attempted vainly to stop the invasion, Hope assisted in rescuing sailors from damaged ships and embarked wounded soldiers. Departing 12 May 1945, the ship moved back to the Philippines and arrived 3 July at Tarakan Island to assist, if needed, in the evacuation of Australian casualties in the invasion of Balikpapan. She then returned to the Philippines, greeting the surrender of Japan 15 August at Manila Bay. Much medical and evacuation work remained to be done, however, and Hope sailed 20 August for Okinawa and Japan, arriving Wakayama 22 September to assist in the occupation. She sailed 22 October with returnees, arriving San Francisco 15 November, and subsequently made two more voyages to Guam and the Philippines to bring back the sick and wounded. Hope returned to San Francisco 22 March 1946 and decommissioned 9 May 1946. From 1946 to 1950 she was in custody of the War Department.

The USS Hope (AH-7) is not to be confused with the USS Consolation (AH-15), in service from 1945 to 1975, donated to Project HOPE in 1958, and operated between March 1960 and September 1974 as the civilian hospital ship SS Hope. It completed 11 voyages between 1960 and 1973, traveling to Indonesia, South Vietnam, Peru, Ecuador, Guinea, Nicaragua, Colombia, Sri Lanka, Tunisia, Jamaica, and Brazil.

== See also ==
- USS Comfort (AH-6)
- USS Relief
- AHS Centaur
- SS Op ten Noort
- Japanese war crimes
