= Ellen Savage =

Australian army nurse and hospital matron

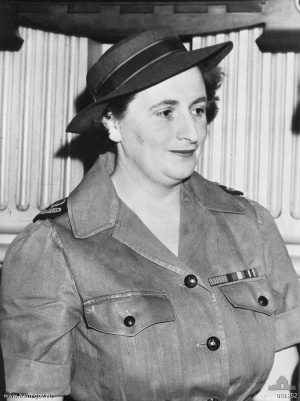
- Born: 17 October 1912; Quirindi, New South Wales
- Died: 25 April 1985 (aged 72); Sydney, New South Wales
- Military career
- Allegiance: Australia
- Branch: Second Australian Imperial Force
- Service years: 1941–1946
- Rank: Lieutenant
- Service number: NFX76584
- Unit: Australian Army Nursing Service
- Conflicts: Second World War
- Awards: George Medal

Ellen Savage, GM (17 October 1912 – 25 April 1985) was an Australian army nurse and hospital matron from Quirindi, New South Wales.

Savage was the only nurse to survive the sinking of the hospital ship Centaur off the Queensland coast in 1943. She was a founding member of the Australian College of Nursing, and a recipient of the George Medal and of a Florence Nightingale memorial scholarship.

== Name ==
Savage signed herself as Ellen in formal letters, and most reporting is by that name, including her official war service record. However, significant reporting in otherwise reliable sources is with Eleanor.

Her own family referred to her as Nelly.

== Early life and education ==
Ellen Savage was born on 17 October 1912 at Quirindi, New South Wales, where she grew up as a child. She was the third daughter of Henry Savage and Sarah Ann Savage (née Mulheron). Her father was born in Russia and her mother was born in New South Wales.

Savage was a good swimmer, keen on surfing, at Newcastle, but did suffer from seasickness.

=== Education ===
As a child Savage attended Quirindi Convent school.

Savage trained as a nurse at Newcastle Hospital from 1929, and graduated in 1934. She studied obstetrics at the Women's Hospital, Crown Street, Sydney, and mothercraft at Tresillian Mothercraft Training School, Petersham. She passed her midwifery examination in June 1936.

In 1947 she won a Florence Nightingale memorial scholarship for postgraduate study in England, where she gained a diploma in nursing administration from the Royal College of Nursing. Savage was the inaugural recipient of this scholarship for New South Wales. Her overseas studies also included observational tours of hospitals in England, Scandinavia, and Canada. Savage complete her scholarship studies with distinction. The scholarship was supported by funding provided through a Red Cross appeal.

== Adult life ==
Savage was an army nurse from 1941 to 1946, and then worked in other hospitals until she retired in 1967, a nursing career of 41 years.

She was a Catholic, and while overseas after her scholarship studies, had a private audience with the Pope. One report on the sinking of the Centaur states that she snatched up her rosary beads while abandoning ship, while another directly contradicts this.

Savage lived in Gordon, Sydney, New South Wales.

Savage was a founding member (1949), council-member (1952–59), and president (1957–58) of the Australian College of Nursing.

=== Public interest ===
There was considerable public interest in Savage's activities, and what she did, her presentation to Mrs. Roosevelt, and for example attending reunions and presenting nurse trainee awards, when she was taken ill, and the launching of ships. Reporting on her included when and where she went for holidays.

Media attention to Savage's actions after the Centaur sinking was wide and varied in nature and includes presentation in cartoon comic strip format.

Savage was presented to the British royal family in May 1948 while she was in England studying. The public's interest in Savage continued after her return from her scholarship studies in England. Reporting followed her to many places and on many activities, for example nurses outings organised by the Royal Queensland Yacht Club, as a guest speaker, meeting survivors of other war incidents, and presentation to Lady Louis Mountbatten.

Savage was formally described by the Women's Weekly as one of their Interesting People in 1949.

Savage was the first guest at Centaur House. A sponsor provided her a car for the five days of her visit and stay.

Public interest followed Savage well after the war, for example, at ANZAC Day reunions, being individually noteworthy in 1983 ANZAC day radio programming, and being singled out in AHS Centaur commemorations in 1995.

=== Charity work ===
The public's interest in Savage was an opportunity realised by her. Savage took many opportunities to support charity work, especially war related, for example Legacy, or nursing related, and the Red Cross.

==== Centaur House ====
She was actively involved in fund-raising that helped to establish Centaur House, Brisbane, an educational and social centre for nurses. Of note is that Savage wrote an open letter while studying in England supporting Centaur House. Savage was the guest of honour for multiple events for this cause.

She was given a special suite on her stay at Centaur House.

=== Advocacy ===
Savage was a strong advocate for nurse education, voicing her opinion that nurse education must be advanced to compete internationally, especially post graduate. And she was actively involved in fund raising for nurse education.

She was also an advocate for nursing generally, espousing the capabilities of married nurses, especially nursing with chronic cases.

=== Later life ===
Savage participated in a film about the Australian War Memorial in 1977. The film, Australia Remembers, screened in 1978.

Savage died on 25 April 1985 after attending an Anzac Day reunion. She collapsed outside Sydney Hospital and died that day. She never married.

== Career ==
Savage undertook general training from 1929 to 1934 at Royal Newcastle Hospital. From 1934 to 1937 while private nursing she gained midwifery and Tressilian mothercraft certificates, in 1937 she had 12 months at Tressilian Home, Petersham. Savage was with the New South Wales Public Health Department from 1937 to 1941, and in 1941 she joined Australian Army Nursing Service (AANS). From 1946 to 1947 she was in charge of a health centre in North Sydney, and in 1947 took the 18 month Florence Nightingale Memorial scholarship. In 1949 became a Supervisory Sister, part of administrative staff, at Newcastle General Hospital.

Savage's first professional position was at the Baby Health Centre in the regional Australian city of Tamworth, in 1938.

She was a triple certificate sister:

- general nursing
- midwifery
- mothercraft

Savage joined Australian Army Nursing Service on 24 May 1941, being appointed to the 113th Australian General Hospital (AGH), Concord, Sydney. She transferred to the Australian Imperial Force on 18 November 1941 and served in the Middle East in the hospital ship Oranje.

She was promoted to sister on 25 May 1942 and commissioned as a lieutenant in March 1943.

Savage survived the sinking of the Centaur hospital ship in May 1943.

She resumed nursing at the AGH on 14 August 1943 and served there until demobilised on 8 March 1946.

After her AIF discharge, Savage returned to the Public Health Department of New South Wales. Posting on discharge was the hospital ship Oranje.

Savage resigned from Division of Maternal and Baby Welfare, Department of Public Health 17 February 1949.

Appointed senior sister at (Royal) Newcastle Hospital, she was respected and somewhat feared for her insistence on high standards of discipline and knowledge.

At Newcastle Hospital she was unexpectedly passed over for the post of director of nursing by the medical superintendent, Dr Christian McCaffrey, because she was ‘entrenched in the "old school mode" wanting to maintain subservience and military discipline’.

She was matron of the hospital's chest unit at Rankin Park from 3 April 1951 until ill health forced her resignation in 1967, and she continued to live in Gordon, Sydney.

=== AHS Centaur ===
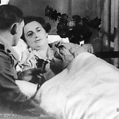
Sister Ellen Savage, Australian Army Nursing Service (AANS), being interviewed at Greenslopes Army Hospital about 7 or 10 days after her rescue from the hospital ship Centaur.

On 12 May 1943 Savage was one of twelve nurses who sailed in the hospital ship Centaur bound for Port Moresby to recover wounded military personnel. Two days after leaving Sydney the vessel was sunk off Moreton Island, Queensland, by a Japanese torpedo. A strong swimmer, Savage was the only nurse to survive.

Savage suffered severe bruising, a fractured nose, burst ear drums, a broken palate, and fractured ribs. She joined other survivors on a makeshift raft and concealed her own injuries. She assisted the others, many of whom were severely burned. She raised their morale with group prayer and recitation of the rosary, and supervised the rationing of scant water and food supplies. Other records state she also had a broken jaw.

Savage spent two hours in the water before being dragged onto a raft. They were rescued by the destroyer, USS Mugford, thirty-four hours later, a total of thirty-six hours after the sinking.

=== George Medal ===
For "conspicuous service and high courage" arising from the sinking of the Centaur, in 1944, she became the second Australian woman to be awarded the George Medal.

The citation for her award read:

Although suffering from severe injuries received as a result of the explosion and immersion in the sea, she displayed great heroism during the period while she and some male members of the ship's staff were floating on a raft, to which they clung for about 34 hours before being rescued by a US destroyer. She gave conspicuous service while on the raft in attending to wounds and burns suffered by other survivors. Her courage and fortitude did much to maintain the morale of her companions.

== Memoria ==
On 7 April 1993 Australia issued a postage stamp in honour of Ellen Savage.

Savage is also commemorated in street art, for example at the corner of Logan Road and Chatsworth Road, Greenslopes, Brisbane.
