= USS Relief (AH-1) =

First built-for-purpose hospital ship of the U.S. Navy

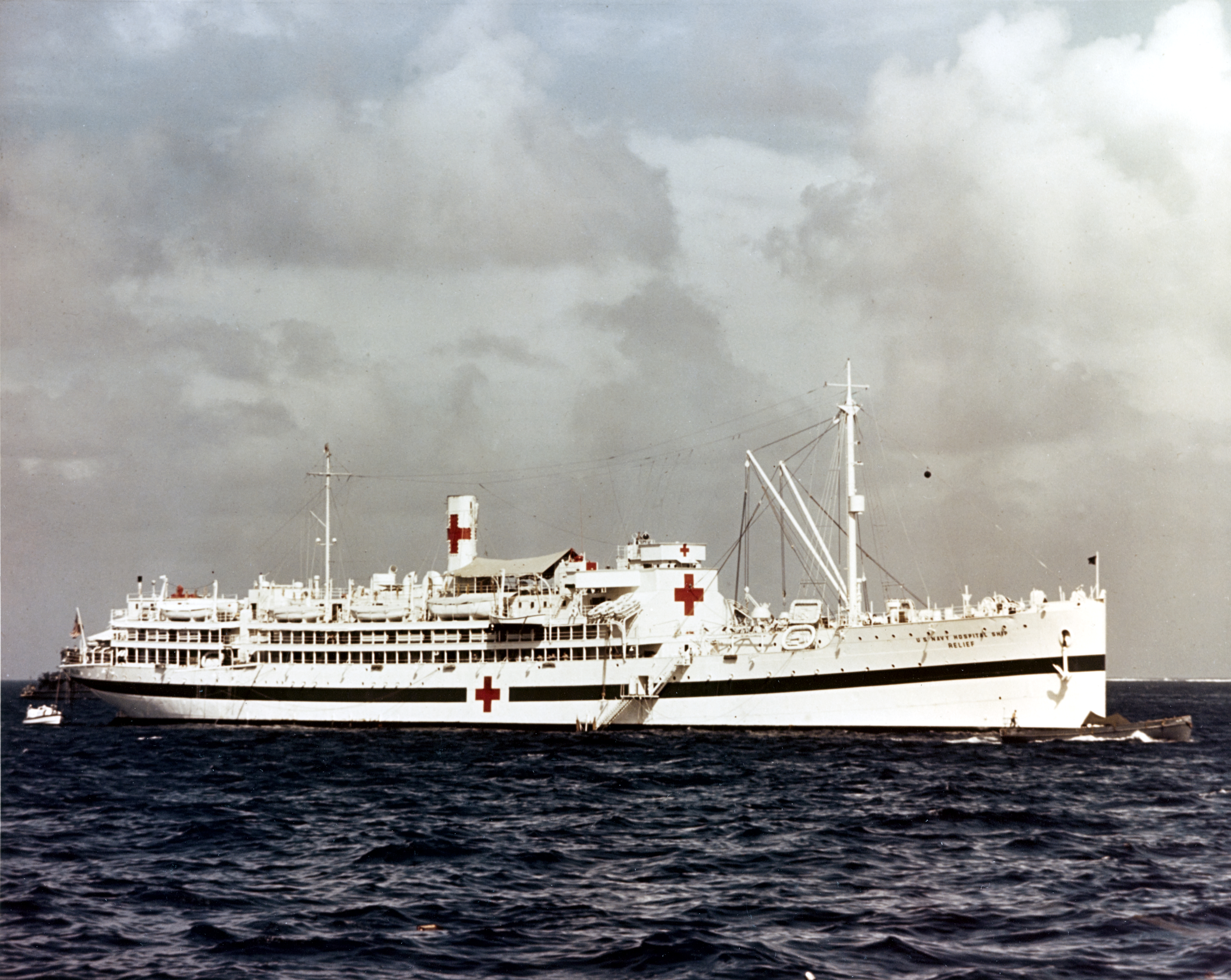
- USS Relief in 1945

History

United States
- Name: USS Relief (AH-1)
- Namesake: Relief: Aid given in time of need
- Builder: Philadelphia Navy Yard
- Laid down: 14 June 1917
- Launched: 23 December 1919
- Commissioned: 28 December 1920
- Decommissioned: 11 June 1946
- Stricken: 19 July 1946
- Honours and awards: Five battle stars for World War II service
- Fate: Sold for scrap 23 March 1948

General characteristics
- Displacement: 10,112 Tons
- Length: 483 ft 10 in (147.47 m)
- Beam: 61 ft (19 m)
- Draft: 19 ft 6 in (5.94 m)
- Speed: 16 knots
- Complement: 375
- Notes: Bed capacity of 550

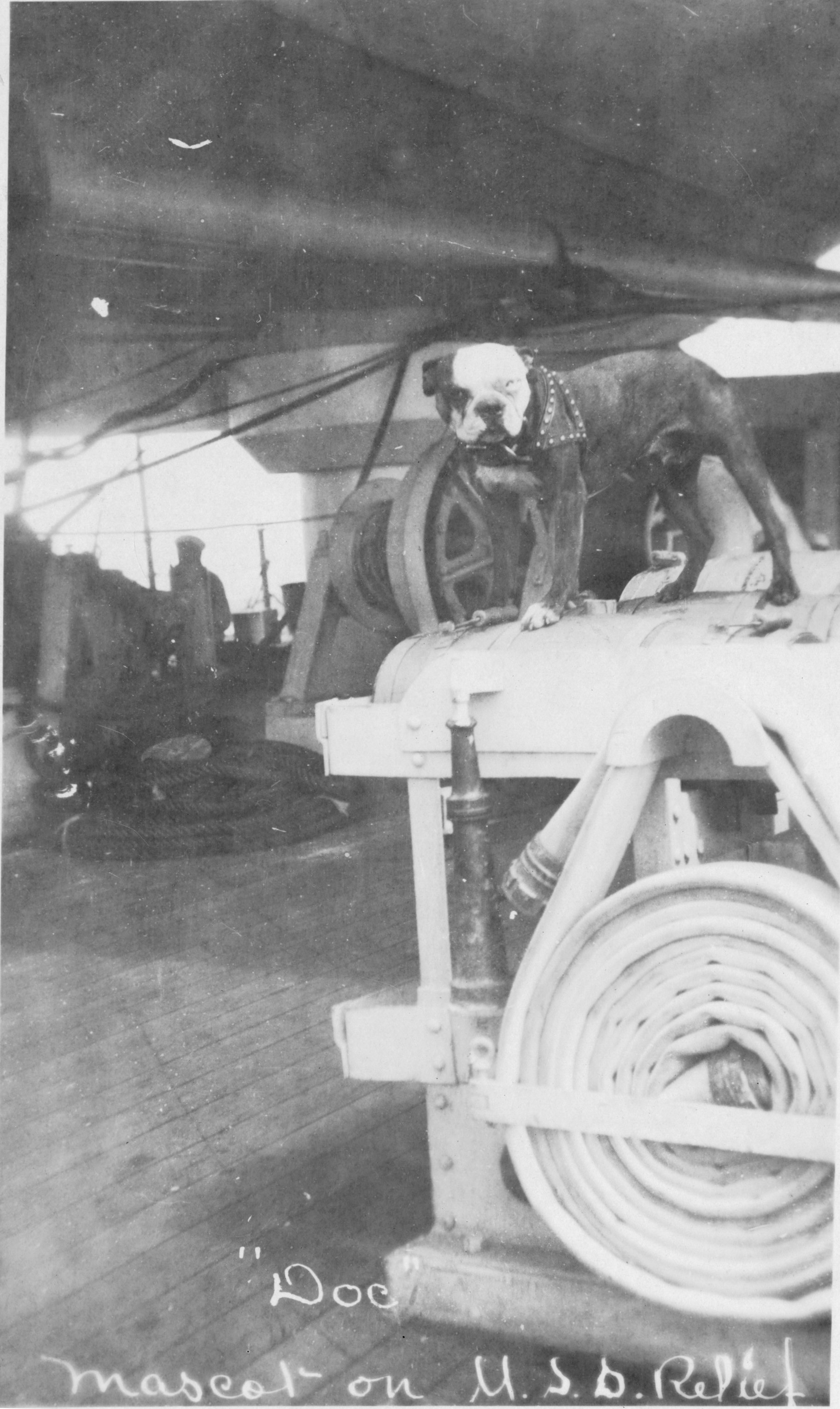
Ship mascot "Doc"

The sixth USS Relief (AH-1), the first ship of the United States Navy designed and built from the keel up as a hospital ship, was laid down 14 June 1917 by the Philadelphia Navy Yard; launched 23 December 1919; and commissioned 28 December 1920 at Philadelphia, Commander Richmond C. Holcomb, Medical Corps, USN, in command.

With a bed capacity of 550 patients, Relief was one of the world's most modern and best equipped hospital ships. Assigned to the Atlantic Fleet, she departed Philadelphia 26 February 1921 to provide fleet units on Caribbean maneuvers with all the facilities of a modern shore hospital.

== Early service ==
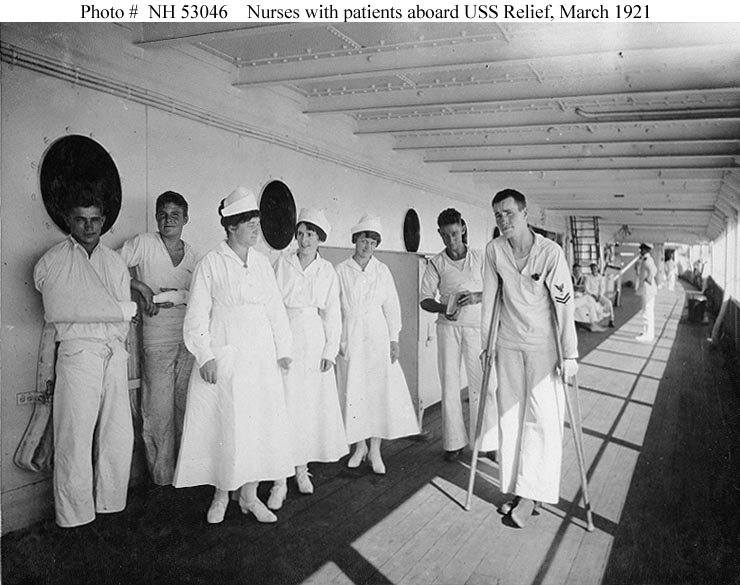
Nurses and their patients aboard USS Relief in 1921

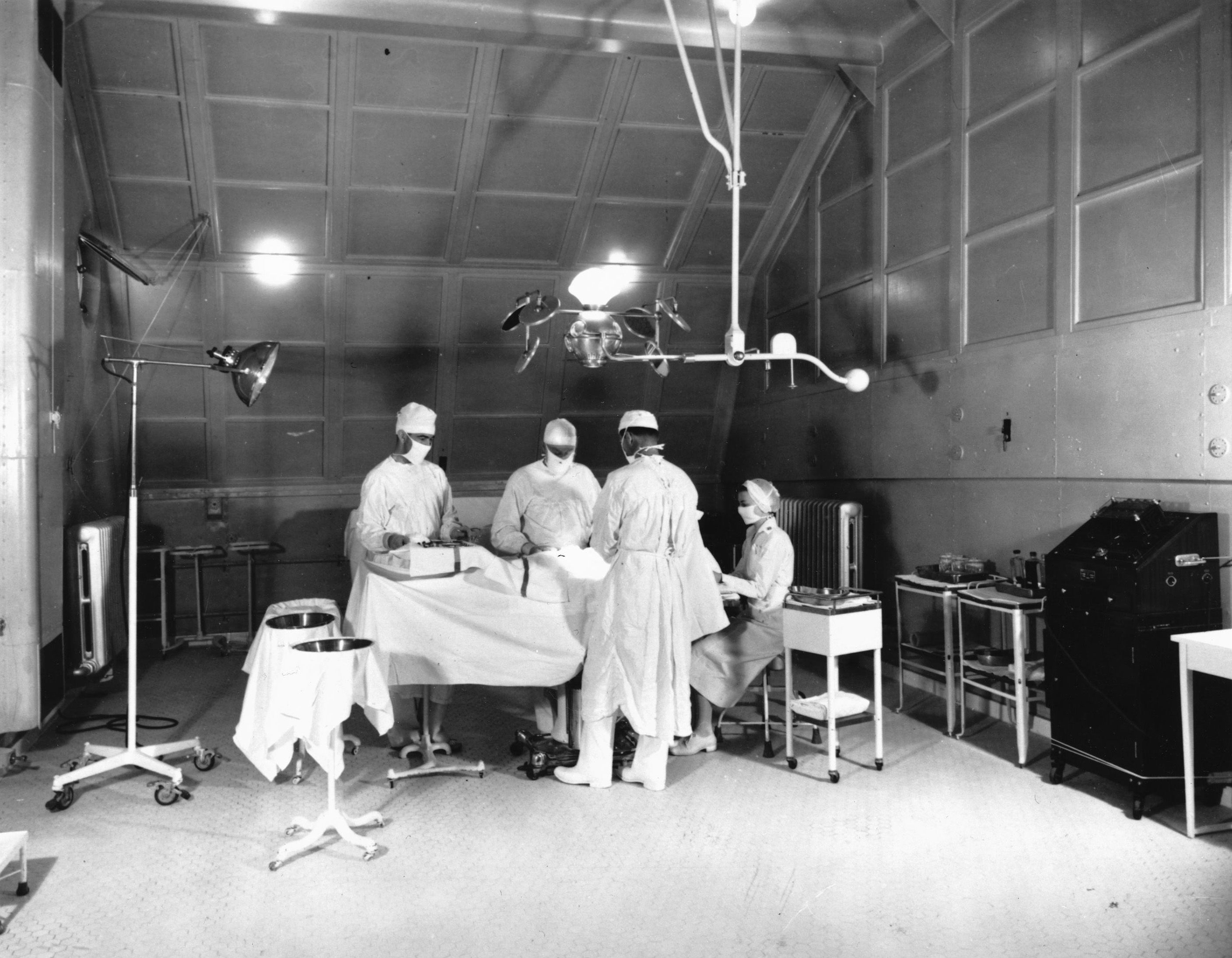
Surgery

Relief returned north to Philadelphia 28 April 1921 to serve the fleet in waters ranging from the Virginia Capes to the New England coast. During this service Captain Holcomb was relieved of command 5 September 1921 by Captain Thomas L. Johnson, a line officer. Following a proclamation made by Theodore Roosevelt in 1908, it had been customary for hospital ships to be commanded by medical officers. But now, as a result of a review decision of the Judge Advocate General 6 June 1921, the old tradition of line officer command of ships was re-established.

As a result of this decision, Navy Regulations were changed, and the controversy ended. (Change No. 2 to 1920 Navy Regulations.)

Relief continued to serve the Atlantic Fleet until the conclusion of the winter-spring maneuvers of 1923, which took her to Cuba and Panama Bay. Departing the Panama Canal Zone 31 March 1923 for San Diego, California, she arrived 12 April. There she relieved USS Mercy (AH-4) as hospital ship for the Pacific Fleet and participated in fleet battle problems conducted northward to Alaska and westward to Hawaii. Her usual employment schedule was interrupted 1 July 1925 when she sailed from Pearl Harbor to join the Battle Fleet as it made its good will practice cruise via the Samoan Islands to Australia and New Zealand. She returned to San Pedro, California, 26 September 1925 and continued to serve the Pacific Fleet as the National Emergency preparations swelled the ranks of sailors and marines. This duty ended 3 June 1941 when Relief departed San Diego en route Norfolk, Virginia

== World War II ==
Arriving Norfolk 20 June 1941, Relief thereafter served as a base hospital for the Atlantic Fleet in waters from Charleston, South Carolina, to Newfoundland. She was in port at NS Argentia, Newfoundland, when the Japanese attacked Pearl Harbor. The following day she got underway via Boston for Norfolk. Returning north, she arrived Casco Bay, Maine, 28 April and provided for the health needs of men training to man the navy's new fighting ships. She also cared for victims of the war in the Atlantic.

Relief departed Casco Bay 8 February 1943 and put into the Boston Navy Yard to prepare for duty in the Pacific. By the 23d she was bound via the Panama Canal to the South Pacific Advanced Fleet Base at Nouméa, New Caledonia. The bitter struggle to drive the Japanese from the Solomon Islands was still in progress when she reached her destination 2 April. Marine, navy, and army patients brought out of the combat zones of the Solomons awaited in the New Hebrides for transport to better hospital facilities at Auckland, New Zealand. This evacuation duty kept Relief occupied until 15 November, when she departed Auckland to evacuate battle casualties of the amphibious assaults on the Gilbert Islands.

=== 1944 ===
Relief arrived off Abemama in the Gilberts 24 November, but immediately retired to Funafuti Atoll, Ellice Islands, to serve as a base hospital there until 4 January 1944. She then performed service off Tarawa in the Gilberts for the remainder of the month. She steamed for the Marshalls 31 January to care for battle casualties. On the east side of Carlson Island in Kwajalein Lagoon, she received battle casualties transported by small boat directly from the islands under attack. By the afternoon of 4 February she was bound for Hawaii with 607 patients.

By 21 February, Relief returned to the newly-won Marshalls, bringing medical supplies to be used in establishing shore hospitals on Roi Island. After embarking battle casualties from navy transports, she shifted to Majuro Atoll lagoon 4 March. During the following 3 months, she was the only hospital ship at Majuro where she served some 200,000 officers and men of the 5th Fleet. With medical facilities ashore limited to dispensary service, Relief provided hospitalization for fleet casualties. During this period, units of the fleet made constant air and surface attacks on the Japanese at Jaluit, Mili, Maloelap, Wotje, and other outlying Marshall Island atolls. Enemy attacks on Eniwetok were repulsed. These operations, as well as attacks made by the fleet against Truk and Palau, produced a large number of battle casualties. Relief admitted 1,329 patients and discharged 693 from 4 March through 4 June 1944.

Relief also served as general medical consultation center for the fleet. From her came recommendations for appropriate action for coping with the problems of sanitation. She also served as medical supply depot for the combatant forces. When the fleet departed the Marshalls 4 June for amphibious operations in the Marianas, Relief evacuated her patients by air or surface transport to shore facilities and prepared to evacuate battle casualties of that campaign.

Departing the Marshalls 21 June, Relief anchored off Saipan 3 days later to receive casualties directly from the combat then in progress. She departed that night with 656 patients and debarked them safely at Kwajalein on the 29th. Off Saipan again 15 July, she received 658 patients and again debarked them 5 days later at Kwajalein. The next morning she was steaming for the Marianas to receive 400 casualties from the battle for Tinian Island. Nearly all were very serious cases, so field facilities in the Marshalls were bypassed for the better treatment available in Hawaii. Relief entered Pearl Harbor 15 August. Taking on a maximum load of medical supplies and stores, including one complete field hospital unit, she put to sea 25 August for return to the Marshalls.

Relief arrived at Eniwetok 3 September and transferred 175 tons of medical stores to medical stores barge USS Silica for the use of Service Squadron 10. Meanwhile, her pathologist and laboratory technicians worked to control an epidemic of bacillary dysentery that had broken out in the harbor. On the morning of 18 September, she steamed for the Palau Islands, arriving off Peleliu and Angaur to receive 759 casualties. Some were discharged prior to sailing, but 680 patients were evacuated to army and navy hospitals in New Caledonia. Arriving New Caledonia 11 October, Relief was ordered to evacuate patients directly to the United States. Taking on 489 patients, she departed Nouméa 15 October, touching at Pearl Harbor before arriving San Francisco 3 November.

=== 1945 ===
Overhaul at General Engineering & Drydock Co., Alameda commenced 6 November 1944 and extended through 10 February 1945. Three days later Relief stood out from San Francisco Bay en route to Ulithi, the Carolines, arriving 5 March. On the night of 11 March, two Japanese suicide planes penetrated the harbor, one crashing the after flight deck of carrier USS Randolph and the other crashing on Sorlen Island. Relief received the casualties from Randolph as well as those from task forces returning from operations against the Japanese home islands. She departed Ulithi 26 March and entered Apra Harbor, Guam the following day, transferring 184 patients ashore in preparation for the Okinawa campaign.

Japanese bombers attacked Relief on 2 April. One bomb fell several yards wide of the ship, but the only damage was temporary loss of suction in a lube oil pump. A barrage of antiaircraft fire from destroyer USS Wickes drove off the attackers. Relief anchored off the Okinawa invasion beach by day and stood out to sea each night, illuminated "like a Christmas tree." As massive suicide aerial raids became common at night, the retirement plan was abandoned 9 April and the hospital ships remained in the anchorage area, taking advantage of the cover of smoke screens and turning off their illumination.

On the afternoon of 10 April Relief steamed for Saipan with 556 battle casualties. She then made a quick run to the fleet base at Ulithi for stores and diesel oil, thence steamed back to Okinawa, arriving 22 April. After delivering a complete field hospital unit, she departed 26 April with 613 casualties, arriving Tinian Harbor the 30th. In four similar missions of mercy, she evacuated nearly 2,000 wounded fighting men from Okinawa to hospital facilities at Guam and Saipan.

Relief departed Saipan 7 July and touched at Guam en route San Pedro Bay, Leyte, the Philippines. She served as a Fleet Base Hospital in the Philippines for the remainder of the war. She departed Subic Bay 28 August, steaming via Okinawa for Dairen, Manchuria. Her mission was the recovery of Allied prisoners of war from the former Japanese military prison camp at Mukden, Manchuria. As she passed through the East China and Yellow Seas, USS McNulty and USS Elmore swept out ahead to destroy any mines that might be sighted.

Appearing before Dairen Kou 8 September 1945, Relief gained no sight of either the tugs or the pilots which the Russians had promised. Entering the unfamiliar harbor, she moored unassisted to Pier No. 2. Dairen was under Russian military control, and shore leave was not permitted, although the Russians magnanimously invited the officers ashore on guided tours. The only word of the prisoners was that they were en route by rail from Mukden, some 200 miles (300 km) north of Dairen. The morning of 11 September, a navy doctor and a marine sergeant reported on board from the camp, and they brought word of the approximate number and condition of Relief's prospective passengers. Soon 753 of them arrived - Dutch, British, Australians, and Americans. Many had lived through the infamous death march at Bataan, and most had survived prison camps in the Philippines, Formosa, Honshū, and Manchuria. Outbound to freedom 12 September, they entered Buckner Bay, Okinawa, 3 days later. Before they could be transferred to shore, Relief was ordered to stand out to sea to evade a typhoon. Returning to Buckner Bay 18 September, she debarked her passengers by noon.

On 26 September, Relief steamed for Taku, China, arriving on the 30th to provide medical facilities for the troops of the 1st Marine Division assigned to occupation duty in North China. This service continued until 24 October, when Relief was ordered to carry patients to the west coast of the United States.

Relief embarked patients at Tsingtao, Okinawa, and Guam, and then steamed for home, arriving San Francisco 30 November. By this time the war service of the hospital ship had included steaming the equivalent of nearly four times around the world and the evacuation of nearly 10,000 fighting men as patients from scenes of combat in nearly every military campaign area of the Pacific Theater. Her last transpacific voyage commenced 15 December 1945 when she stood out of San Francisco Bay for Yokosuka, Japan, arriving 4 January 1946. She embarked navy passengers there before proceeding to Saipan and Guam. When she stood out from Apra Harbor 15 January, she carried 282 patients and 717 returning veterans.

She arrived San Francisco 2 February, debarked her passengers, and got underway for the east coast on the 19th, arriving Norfolk, on the 28th. She decommissioned at the Norfolk Naval Shipyard 11 June 1946. Struck from the Navy List 19 July 1946, she was delivered to the War Shipping Administration for disposal 13 January 1947. Relief was sold for scrap 23 March 1948 to the Boston Metals Co.

Relief (AH-1) received five battle stars for World War II service.

== See also ==
- USS Hope (AH-7)
- USS Comfort (AH-6)
- AHS Centaur
- SS Op ten Noort
- Japanese war crimes
