= No. 61 Wing RAAF =

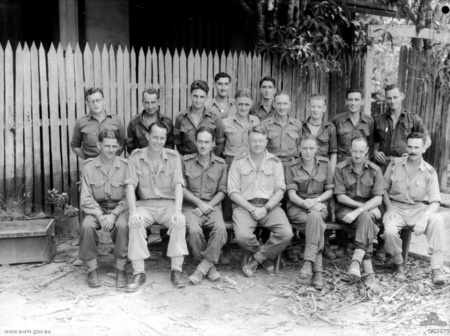
- No. 61 Wing headquarters personnel at Darwin in June 1944. The commanding officer, Wing Commander D.J. Rooney, is in the centre of the front row
- Active: 1943–45
- Country: Australia
- Branch: Royal Australian Air Force
- Role: Airfield construction
- Engagements: World War II: North Western Area Campaign; Battle of Morotai; Battle of Leyte; Battle of Mindoro; Borneo Campaign

No. 61 Wing was a Royal Australian Air Force (RAAF) airfield construction wing of World War II. The wing was formed in January 1943 and was disbanded in November 1945. During the war, No. 61 Wing and the units under its command served in the North Western Area and South West Pacific Area (SWPA) and played a significant role in supporting RAAF and United States Army Air Forces (USAAF) operations.

== History ==
No. 61 Wing was established at Camp Pell in Royal Park, Melbourne, on 7 January 1943. It was intended that the wing would command No. 1, No. 3, No. 8 and No. 9 Mobile Works Squadrons as well as No. 11 Works Supply Unit and No. 12 Survey and Design Unit. Several of these units were either being formed or were planned to be established in the future. At the end of January the Wing's Headquarters had a strength of 7 officers and 52 airmen and was in the process of moving to the vicinity of Darwin. By April 1943 No. 61 Wing had several airfield construction squadrons under its command in the Darwin area. All of the wing's units arrived at Darwin by July 1943, though No. 1 Mobile Works Squadron was redeployed to Victoria shortly afterwards as it had completed twelve months service in the tropics. Before departing the squadron was split to form No. 14 Mobile Works Squadron on 20 July, which remained at Darwin. During early 1944 No. 61 Wing built a 10,000-foot (3,000 m) long runway at Darwin to accommodate a proposed deployment of one hundred USAAF B-29 Superfortress heavy bombers. While the airfield was completed, no B-29s were ever based in Darwin as they were instead deployed to India to attack targets in Japan and East Asia as part of Operation Matterhorn.

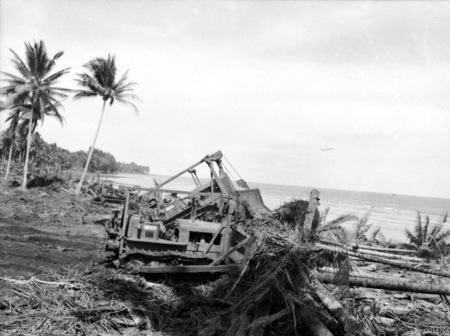
Two No. 14 Airfield Construction Squadron bulldozers knocking over trees to clear land for an airstrip on Morotai

In June 1944 a decision was made to transfer No. 61 Wing from the Darwin area to New Guinea, where it would support the Allied advance towards the Philippines. This was opposed by the Air Officer Commanding North-Western Area, Air Vice Marshal Adrian Cole, who wanted the wing to take part in an operation being planned to capture Selaru island in the Netherlands East Indies (NEI); this operation was effectively cancelled on 7 June, however. No. 61 Wing left Darwin in August and arrived at Morotai in the NEI on 18 September, three days after United States Army forces had first landed on the island in the Battle of Morotai. No. 14 Airfield Construction Squadron landed on Morotai on 18 September and began work on building airfields the next day. Shortly before this operation began No. 12 Survey and Design Unit was absorbed into No. 61 Wing's headquarters on 12 September.

On 25 October 1944, the main units of No. 61 Wing were its headquarters, No. 3 Airfield Construction Squadron and No. 14 Airfield Construction Squadron, all of which were located at Morotai. At this time the Wing came under the command of the Australian First Tactical Air Force (1TAF), which was the RAAF's main mobile formation. In November No. 3 Airfield Construction Squadron was sent to Leyte, Philippines and in December participated in the liberation of Mindoro in the central Philippines while No. 14 Airfield Construction Squadron remained at Morotai to complete and maintain facilities there alongside army engineer units. A liaison party comprising 16 personnel from No. 61 Wing accompanied No. 3 Airfield Construction Squadron.

During the last months of the war, No. 61 Wing took part in the Australian-led Borneo Campaign. On 1 May 1945 No. 1 and No. 8 Airfield Construction Squadrons landed on Tarakan Island during the first day of the Battle of Tarakan. After the island's airfield was captured on 5 May the two squadrons began work on repairing and extending it. The airfield had been seriously damaged by Allied pre-invasion attacks and was waterlogged, however, and could not be made ready for use until 28 June. No. 61 Wing's headquarters and No. 2, No. 3, No. 6 and No. 8 Airfield Construction Squadrons subsequently landed at Balikpapan in Borneo on 6 July and undertook construction tasks near the town during the Battle of Balikpapan. Following the war, No. 61 Wing's headquarters was disbanded at Morotai on 22 November 1945.
