= Trevor Jackson (diver) =

Australian technical diver and author (born 1965)

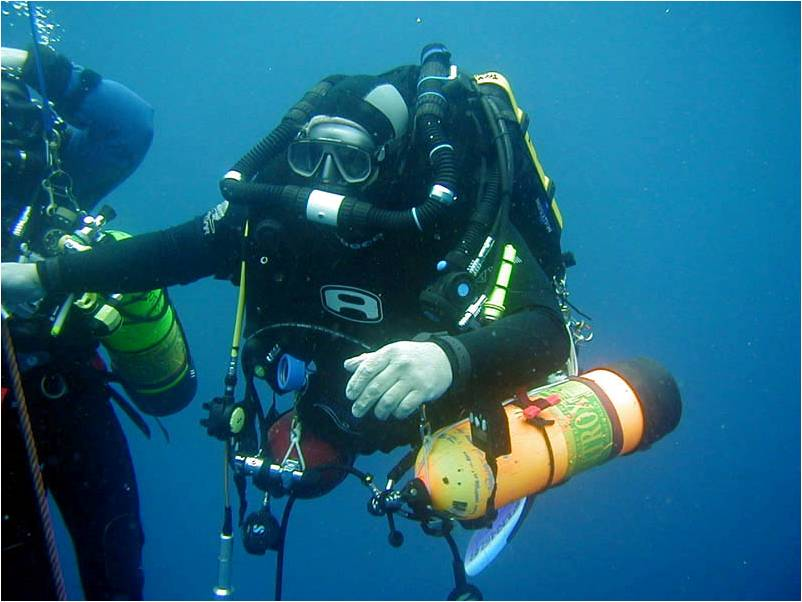
Trevor Jackson returning from a dive on SS Kyogle

Captain Trevor Jackson (born 26 November 1965) is an Australian technical diver, shipwreck researcher, author and inventor. In 2002 he staged what became known as the "Centaur Dive", which subsequently led to the gazetted position of the sunken Hospital Ship AHS Centaur being questioned. Jackson is the inventor of the 'Sea Tiger' lost diver location system, and an author on the subject of wreck diving.

== Centaur dive ==
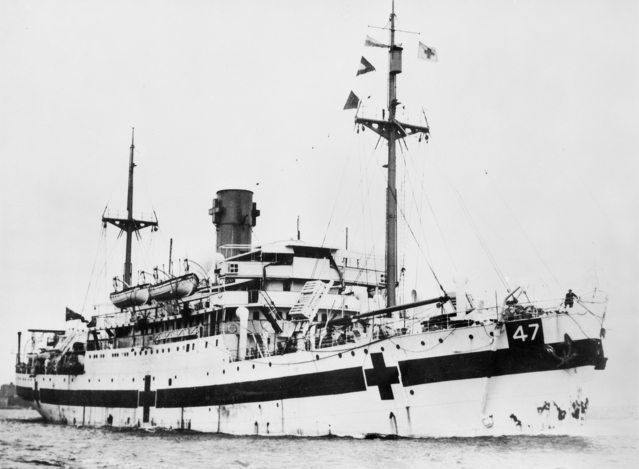
AHS Centaur following her conversion to hospital ship

Jackson had doubted the accuracy of the Australian Government's original findings for some time before he and New Zealand diver, Dr Simon Mitchell, supported by a team of 15 back-up divers, staged a world record scuba dive to investigate the site. The dive took place near Brisbane on 14 May 2002, after nearly a year of planning. At a depth of 178 m (584 ft), the dive was the deepest scuba dive to a wreck undertaken at the time, a world record which held for several years. A camera was taken to the bottom by Jackson but pressure related equipment difficulties meant that no usable footage was retrieved. Despite the lack of conclusive proof, the pair remained adamant for several years that the wreck they had seen on the dive was too small to be the Centaur. Jackson was quoted on the 60 Minutes current affairs program: "[T]his wasn't a wreck of the dimensions that the Centaur was which, you know, was 100m long. It was a much smaller thing". They suspected that the wreck was a small freighter called the Kyogle, sunk in 1951 by the Royal Australian Air Force. Eventually their insistence prompted investigations by the media and the Royal Australian Navy. It was subsequently shown that the Centaur was not where it had been assumed. In 2009 the Queensland Government approved funding for a renewed search for the lost hospital ship. The true resting place of the Centaur was discovered in December of that year.

== Shipwreck discoveries ==
Between 1998 and 2004 Jackson was directly responsible for the initial discovery of at least 19 shipwrecks in the Coral Sea. These ships included the Danish dredger Kaptajn Nielsen, the USNS Dolphin, the SS Dover, and the SV Missie. The latter contained a vast collection of 19th century glassware and is now a declared historic shipwreck. Most of these wrecks lay in depths well beyond the normal limits for recreational scuba diving. In 2005 he won the OZTek Technical Diver of the Year award for his services to wreck exploration. Jackson's research into the exact position and depths of shipwrecks is currently being utilized by the Australian Hydrographic Office for new editions of admiralty charts for Queensland. The Australian Hydrographic Office also removed the protected zone from around the 'old' Centaur position.

In January 2009 Jackson was involved in the Australian National Maritime Museum's discovery and initial survey dives of the 19th century historical Australian shipwreck, HMCS Mermaid [1829], and the Queensland Museum's discovery of the SV Waverley [1889] near Thirsty Sound, Qld, in March later that year.

== Author ==
Captain Jackson is the author of two books on the subject of wreck diving: Wreck Diving in Southern Queensland and Diveabout: Wrecks in Northern Queensland. He is an active writer for several dive publications and websites.

== Lost diver buoys ==
During 2009, Jackson patented a system of using specially designed buoys to locate divers lost on the surface. The system has been adopted by dive operators in the US, New Zealand and Australia. The system draws upon the 'deliberate error theory', utilized by US Navy pilots during World War II to relocate their aircraft carriers. More significantly, it involved the development of buoys tested and weighted to exactly replicate the drift characteristics of non-swimming divers on the surface of the ocean, and the use of timed and measured vessel manoeuvres.
