= USS Mercy (AH-8) =

Military Vessel

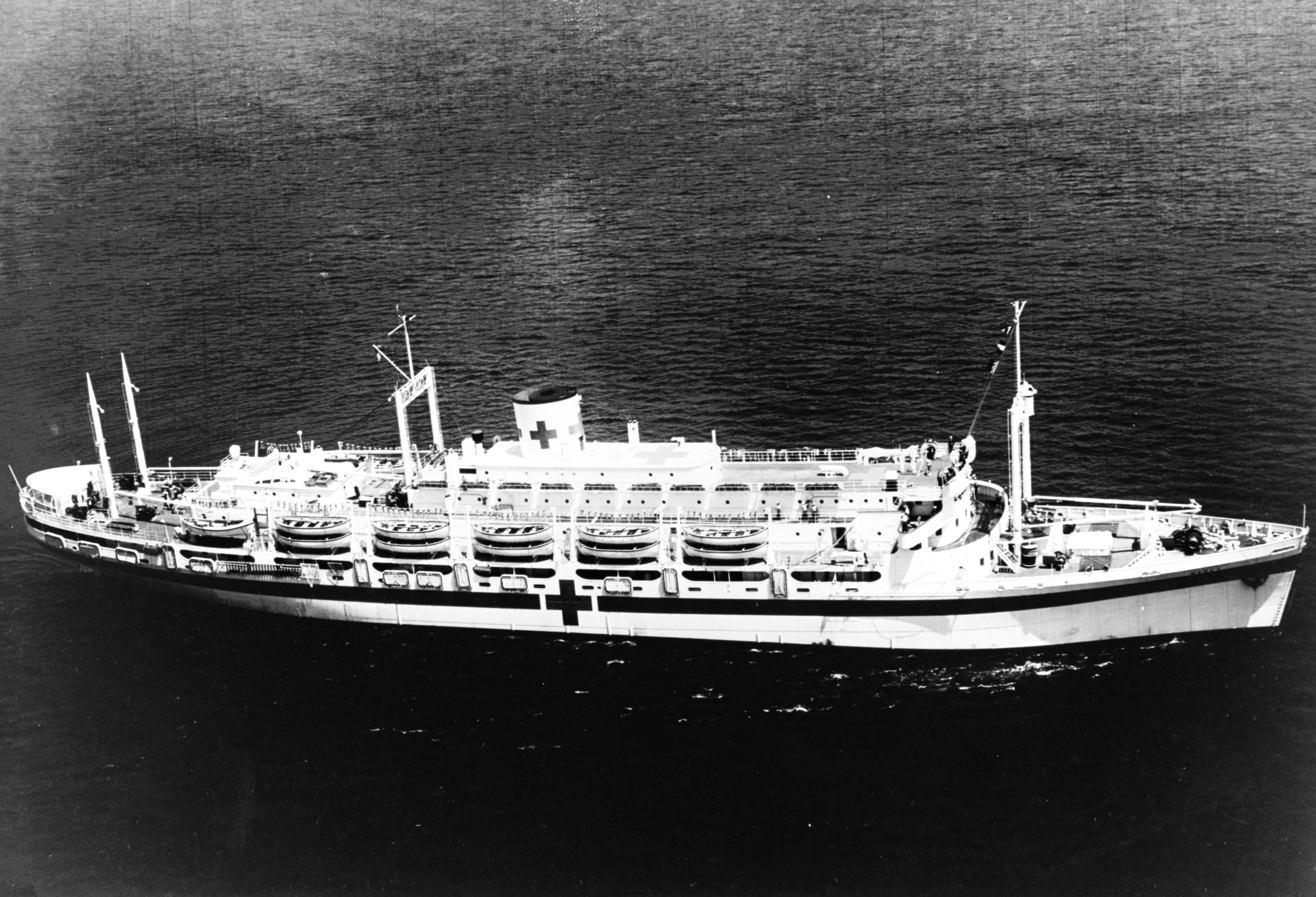
- USS Mercy (AH-8) underway in San Pedro Bay, California, 15 August 1944

History

United States
- Name: USS Mercy
- Builder: Consolidated Steel Corporation, Wilmington, Los Angeles, California
- Laid down: 4 February 1943
- Launched: 25 March 1943
- Sponsored by: Lieutenant (j.g) Doris M. Yetter, NC, USN
- Acquired: 25 March 1943
- Commissioned: 7 August 1944
- Decommissioned: 17 May 1946
- Stricken: 25 September 1946
- Fate: Sold for scrap, 23 November 1970

General characteristics
- Class & type: Comfort-class hospital ship
- Displacement: 9,800 long tons (9,957 t)
- Length: 416 ft (127 m)
- Beam: 60 ft 2 in (18.34 m)
- Draft: 24 ft 6 in (7.47 m)
- Propulsion: Geared turbine, single screw, 4,000 shp (2,983 kW)
- Speed: 15.3 knots (17.6 mph; 28.3 km/h)
- Capacity: 400 patients
- Complement: 516
- Armament: None

Service record
- Operations: World War II
- Awards: 2 battle stars

The second USS Mercy (AH-8) was a Comfort-class hospital ship laid down under Maritime Commission contract by Consolidated Steel Corporation at the Wilmington Yard, Wilmington, California, on 4 February 1943. She was acquired by the US Navy from the Maritime Commission on 25 March 1943 and launched the same day, sponsored by Lieutenant (junior grade) Doris M. Yetter, NC, USN, who had been a prisoner of war on Guam in 1941. She was converted from a cargo ship to a hospital ship by Los Angeles Shipbuilding & Drydock Company, San Pedro, California and commissioned 7 August 1944.

== Service history ==
Mercy was one of three hospital ships, the others being USS Comfort (AH-6) and USS Hope (AH-7), built, commanded and crewed by the Navy for the Army. These ships, unlike the Navy hospital ships, were intended for evacuation and transport of patients after primary care had been given. Medical equipment and personnel were provided by the Army. The Army medical complement table of organization provided for the temporary reinforcement of the staff if the ship directly supported amphibious operations.

=== Philippines ===
After shakedown beginning 17 August, Mercy, staffed by the US Army's 214th Hospital Ship personnel, was assigned to NTS to operate with the 5th and 7th Fleets. She departed San Pedro 31 August for the South Pacific and, after calls at Pearl Harbor and Eniwetok, arrived Hollandia, New Guinea, 14 October. Five days later the hospital ship departed for the Philippines for the initial landing at Leyte on 20 October, arriving off Leyte Gulf the morning of 25 October to find the Battle for Leyte Gulf still raging for another day.

Mercy moved to San Pedro Bay later the same day and began embarking some 400 casualties, mostly from LSTs alongside. On 26 October she sailed for the Admiralties, via Kossol Roads, Palau, Caroline Islands, arriving at Manus to disembark the wounded for transfer to base hospitals. During the next five months, Mercy completed seven more voyages from Leyte to Manus, or Hollandia. She also transported the 3rd Field Hospital from New Guinea to Tacloban, Philippines, early in January 1945.

=== Okinawa ===
On 19 March Mercy reported to the 5th Fleet at Ulithi, Caroline Islands, for service during the Okinawa campaign, beginning with the landings 1 April. She arrived off Okinawa the morning of 19 April in company with USS Solace (AH-5) to remain for four days at Hagushi Beach embarking patients despite frequent air raids and threat of kamikazes. The hospital ship then got underway for Saipan, Marianas Islands, 23 April. She made two more voyages to Okinawa, returning from the latter to Saipan 24 May.

Mercy next carried wounded from Leyte and Manila on two voyages to Biak, returning to Manila on 23 June for two months' duty as station hospital ship. On 19 August she embarked the 227th Station Hospital assigned to the Korean Occupation Forces, and three days later departed for Korea via Okinawa, arriving Jinsen 9 September.

On 19 October the hospital ship departed for Manila and San Pedro, California, arriving 14 November. She got underway for the central Pacific 4 February 1946, arriving Pearl Harbor on 12 February for duty until 2 April when she returned to California.

Mercy decommissioned at San Francisco, California, 17 May, was delivered to the War Department the same day, and transferred to the US Army 20 June for further service as a hospital ship. On 25 September 1946, she was struck from the Naval Vessel Register.

Mercy received two battle stars for her World War II service.

=== Post-war ===
She was decommissioned in 1946 and placed in reserve. In 1956, she was sold to the State University of New York Maritime College as the training ship, Empire State III. She served in this role until being replaced in 1959. She was later scrapped in 1970.
