= List of Australian hospital ships =

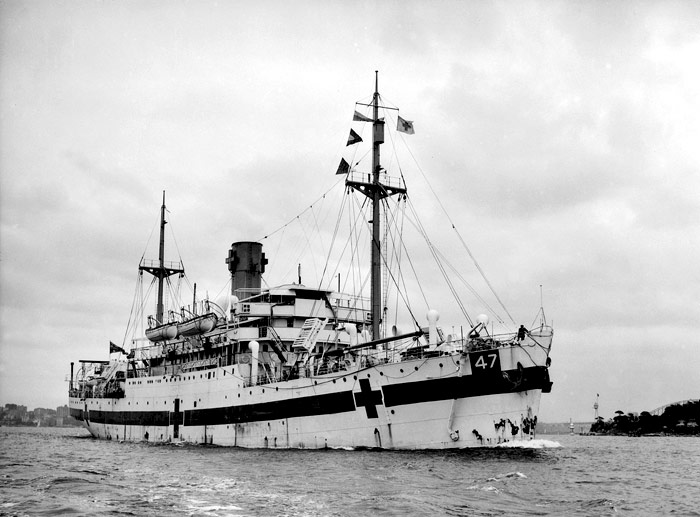
AHS Centaur following her conversion to hospital ship. The Red Cross designation "47" can be seen on the bow.

The Australian Hospital Ships, using ship prefix AHS, were a number of converted civilian ships used for medical services during the Second World War. They were all staffed primarily by the Army Medical staff.

The ships fell into two groups: Australian ships and Dutch ships transferred to the Australian Government. The Dutch ships retained their original Dutch officers and Javanese sailors, with replacements from an international pool being added as necessary, and they also continued to sail under the Dutch flag.

A third group, closely associated with the island campaigns near Australia and Australian troops, were actually Dutch hospital ships operated under United States Army control.

== Australian conversions ==
=== AHS Manunda ===
Manunda was an Australian registered and crewed ship converted to a hospital ship in 1940. First sailing to Suez in October 1940, Manunda saw service in both the Middle East and Pacific Campaigns, specifically New Guinea. Manunda was present at the Japanese bombing of Darwin, where she received repairable damage. In September 1946, Manunda ended her wartime service, and was returned to her parent company following a refit, resuming passenger movements around the coast of Australia.

=== AHS Wanganella ===
Wanganella was an Australian registered and crewed ship converted a to hospital ship in 1941. She was built by Harland and Wolff Limited in Belfast, in 1932. Originally, the 9,576 gross register tons (GRT) vessel was to be named Achimota and operated by the British and African Steam Navigation Company, but financial difficulties caused the ship to be sold to Huddart Parker. Wanganella served as a hospital ship from 19 May 1941 until 1946, during which time she covered 251,011 nautical miles (464,872 km) and transported 13,385 wounded.

=== AHS Centaur ===
Centaur was British-registered with an Australian crew. She was converted to a hospital ship on 12 March 1943. She was torpedoed by Japanese submarine I-177 on 14 May 1943, during her second voyage to New Guinea as a hospital ship. Of the 332 medical personnel and civilian crew aboard, 268 died.

=== AHS Oranje ===
The Oranje, a Dutch-registered vessel of 20,565 tons owned by Stoomvaart Maatschappy Nederland SMN Line, was completed in 1939. While on her maiden voyage to Jakarta, World War II was declared, and by the time she reached her destination, the Netherlands had been occupied by Nazi Germany. Oranje's captain was ordered to Sydney, and to present his ship to Australian authorities. At the same time, the Netherlands Government informed the Australian Government that Oranje was to be converted to a hospital ship, at the Netherlands' cost. Converted at Cockatoo Island Dockyard, Oranje continued to be crewed by Dutch officers and Javanese (Indonesian) sailors. Oranje Dutch hospital ships and operated in the Middle East, Indian, and Pacific Campaigns, making 40 voyages over the five years of her service.

== Other ships ==
Other ships were closely associated with Australian troops and campaigns in the region though not themselves Australian hospital ships.

=== Maetsuycker ===
The Maetsuycker, a Dutch Registered vessel, 4,131 GRT, 361 ft 6 in (110.2 m) in length, owned by Koninklijke Paketvaart-Maatschappij (KPM) of Batavia, Dutch East Indies was completed in 1937. She was converted to hospital ship at the cost of the Dutch government, crewed by Dutch Officer's and Javanese (Indonesian) sailors to treat transport 250 patients.

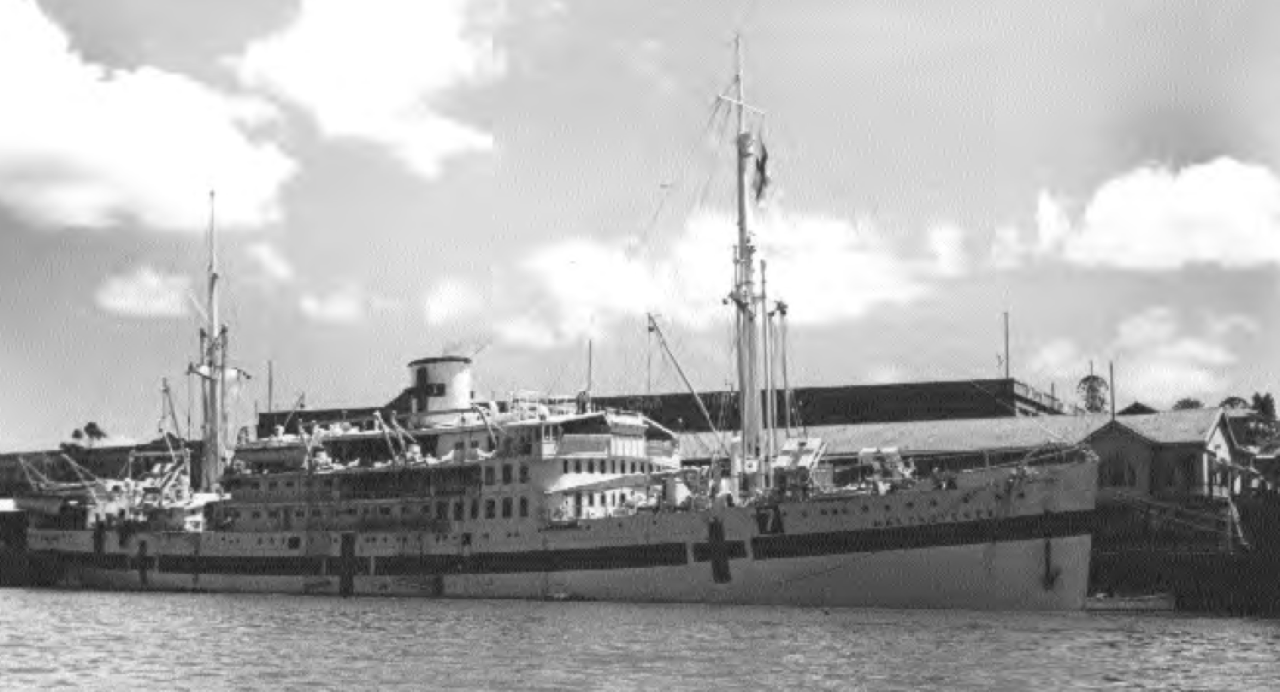

She sailed under the control of the US Army for intra-theater use, but was a Dutch hospital ship flying the Dutch Flag and certified by the Netherlands Government under the Hague Convention. She served in New Guinea and the Southwest Pacific Area (SWPA) as part of the SWPA Command's permanent local fleet with the local "X" number (Note: From early March 1943 SWPA assigned numbers to large ships in its permanent local fleet preceded with an "X" until 15 January 1945 when the "X" was changed to "Y" with retention of the number.) 12.

Maetsuycker officially became a U.S. hospital ship at a ceremony 4 February 1944 with an address by the Consul-General for the Netherlands. U.S. Army medical personnel staffed the hospital facilities.

=== Tasman ===
The Tasman, a Dutch Registered vessel, 4,922 GRT, 392 ft (119.5 m) in length built in 1921, owned by KPM Shipping Co. Batavia Dutch East Indies. The Tasman was converted to hospital ship at the cost of the United States government to transport 250 patients. United States Army nurses helped staff the ship. However she continued crewed by Dutch officers and Javanese (Indonesian) sailors. She sailed under the control of the US Army for intra-theater use, but was a Dutch hospital ship flying the Dutch Flag and certified by the Netherlands Government under the Hague Convention. She served in New Guinea and the Southwest Pacific Area (SWPA) as part of the SWPA Command's permanent local fleet with the local "X" number 16. The Tasman was at the Vanguard throughout the Pacific campaign and transported repatriated prisoners of war from the Japanese prison camps at Santo Thomas Philippines.

Two other ships of the KPM line, the Ophir and Melchior-Treub were also converted to hospital ship use and operated in the Indian Ocean and Bombay area.
