= USS Comfort (AH-6) =

U.S. Navy hospital ship

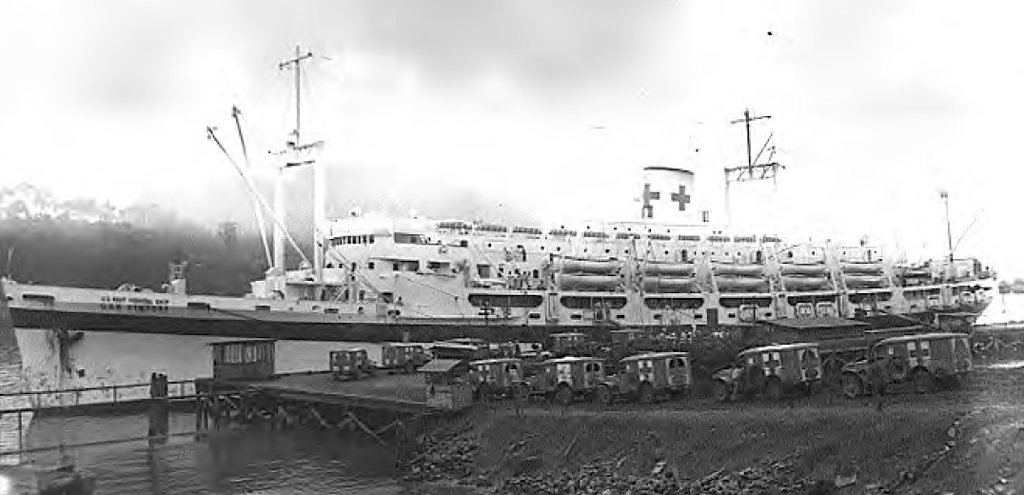
- USS Comfort arrives at Hollandia, February 1945

History

United States
- Builder: Bethlehem Steel Company, San Pedro, Los Angeles
- Launched: 18 March 1943
- Commissioned: 5 May 1944
- Decommissioned: 19 April 1946
- Notes: Transferred to the United States Army 19 April 1946

General characteristics
- Displacement: 6,000 tons
- Length: 417 ft 9 in (127.33 m)
- Beam: 60 ft (18 m)
- Draught: 27 ft 8 in (8.43 m)
- Speed: 14 kts
- Complement: 233

The second USS Comfort (AH-6) was launched 18 March 1943 by Consolidated Steel Corporation, Wilmington, Los Angeles, under a Maritime Commission contract; sponsored by First Lieutenant E. Hatchitt, USAMC; transferred to the Navy the same day; converted to a hospital ship by Bethlehem Steel Co., San Pedro, Calif.; and commissioned 5 May 1944.

== History ==
Comfort was one of three hospital ships, the others being USS Hope (AH-7) and USS Mercy (AH-8), built, commanded and crewed by the Navy for the Army. These ships, unlike the Navy hospital ships, were intended for evacuation and transport of patients after primary care had been given. Medical equipment and personnel were provided by the Army. The Army medical complement table of organization provided for the temporary reinforcement of the staff if the ship directly supported amphibious operations.

Comfort operated throughout World War II with a Navy crew and Army medical personnel. She sailed from San Pedro, on 21 June 1944 for Brisbane, Australia, and Hollandia, New Guinea. Operating from Hollandia, where a major Army hospital center had been established to handle casualties from the Philippine operations, the hospital ship evacuated wounded from Leyte, Philippine Islands, on two voyages in October and November and then brought patients back to San Pedro, Calif., in December. Returning by way of Leyte, Comfort reached Hollandia on 6 February 1945. Following a voyage to Subic Bay and Lingayen Gulf, Luzon, for evacuees in March, the hospital ship stood by off Okinawa from 2 to 9 April, receiving wounded for evacuation to Guam. Returning to Okinawa on 23 April, six days later she was struck by a Japanese suicide plane. The plane crashed through three decks exploding in surgery which was filled with medical personnel and patients. Casualties were 28 killed (including six nurses), and 48 wounded, with considerable damage to the ship. After temporary repairs at Guam Comfort sailed for Los Angeles, Calif., arriving on 28 May.

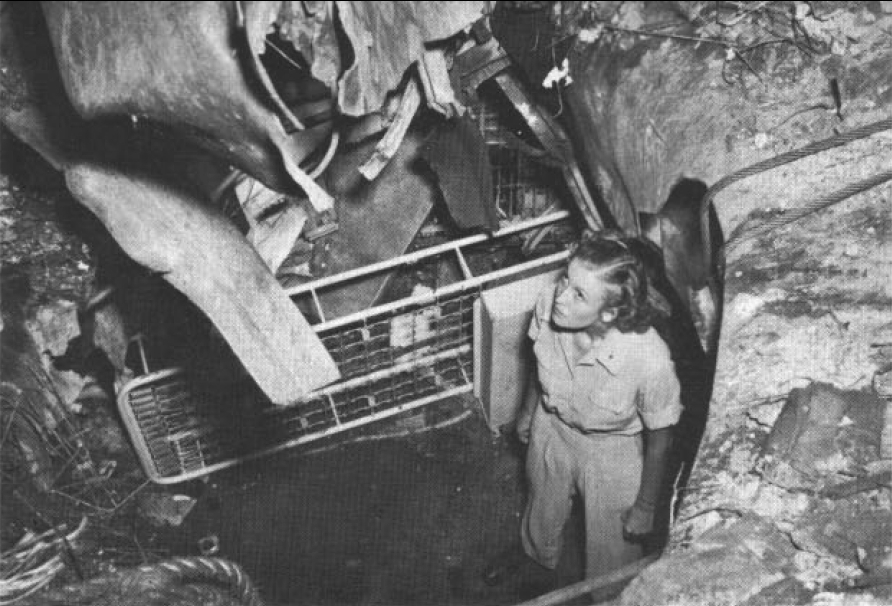
A nurse surveying the kamikaze damage in April 1945.

Comfort arrived in Subic Bay on 5 September 1945 and until 11 October served as station hospital ship. Following a voyage to Okinawa she sailed for home by way of Yokohama, Japan, and Guam, reaching San Pedro, Calif., on 11 December. She made another voyage to Manila, Yokohama, Inchon, Korea, and Okinawa between 1 January and 4 March 1946 before being decommissioned at San Francisco on 19 April 1946. She was transferred to the Army the same day.

Comfort received two battle stars for World War II service.

In 1953, Comfort was loaned to the Maine Maritime Academy in Castine, Maine, where she served for a decade as TS State of Maine, one of the school's training ships.

== In popular culture ==
The ship was mentioned in the JAG episode "Each of Us Angels" (episode 8.14) which aired 4 February 2003. This focused on the United States Navy Nurse Corps in World War II during the Battle of Iwo Jima.

== See also ==
- USS Hope (AH-7)
- USS Relief
- AHS Centaur
- SS Op ten Noort
- Japanese war crimes
